= Raunch 'N' Roll Live =

Live album by Black Oak Arkansas
- Released: February 1973 / 2007
- Recorded: December 1 and 2, 1972
- Venue: Paramount Theatre, Portland, Oregon and Paramount Theatre, Seattle, Washington
- Genre: Southern rock, hard rock, boogie-woogie
- Length: 35:13 / 2:11:53
- Label: ATCO Records
- Producer: Tom Dowd

Black Oak Arkansas chronology
If an Angel Came to See You, Would You Make Her Feel at Home? (1972)	Raunch 'N' Roll Live (1973)	High on the Hog (1973)

Professional ratings
Review scores
Source	Rating
AllMusic	4.5/5 stars

Raunch 'N' Roll Live is a live album by the Southern rock band Black Oak Arkansas, released in 1973. The album was recorded at the Paramount Theatres in Portland, Oregon and Seattle, Washington, on October 30, 1973. It was produced by Tom Dowd and released under the Atco Records label. The album captures the band's energetic and raucous live performance, showcasing their unique blend of hard rock, Southern rock, and boogie-woogie.

== Reception ==
The album Raunch 'N' Roll Live received generally positive reviews from critics. It was praised for its energetic and raw performances, capturing the essence of Black Oak Arkansas' live shows. AllMusic, in their review of the album, gave it a positive rating, highlighting the band's tight musicianship and charismatic stage presence. The reviewer commended the album for its high-octane rock 'n' roll spirit and the band's ability to engage the audience throughout the live recording. The album has been regarded as a strong representation of Black Oak Arkansas' live prowess and their unique blend of Southern rock and boogie.

== Track listing ==
=== Raunch 'N' Roll Live ===
All tracks are written by Black Oak Arkansas.

No.	Title	Original album	Length
1.	"Gettin' Kinda Cocky" (Seattle)		3:22
2.	"When Electricity Came To Arkansas" (Portland)	Black Oak Arkansas	7:28
3.	"Gigolo" (Seattle)		3:09
4.	"Hot Rod" (Seattle)		3:16
5.	"Mutants Of The Monster" (Seattle)	If an Angel Came to See You, Would You Make Her Feel at Home?	5:25
6.	"Hot And Nasty" (Portland)	Black Oak Arkansas	3:45
7.	"Up" (Portland)		8:48
Total length:			35:13

=== The Complete Raunch 'N' Roll Live ===
All tracks are written by Black Oak Arkansas, except where noted.

Over Here: Paramount Theatre, Portland, OR, 12/01/1972
No.	Title	Writer(s)	Original album	Length
1.	"Gettin' Kinda Cocky"			4:04
2.	"Fever In My Mind"		Keep the Faith	4:04
3.	"Uncle Lijiah"		Black Oak Arkansas	4:11
4.	"Keep the Faith"		Keep the Faith	3:58
5.	"Mutants of the Monster"		If an Angel Came to See You, Would You Make Her Feel at Home?	6:08
6.	"Hot Rod"			3:21
7.	"Lord Have Mercy On My Soul"		Black Oak Arkansas	5:45
8.	"Full Moon Ride"		If an Angel Came to See You, Would You Make Her Feel at Home?	4:19
9.	"When Electricity Came To Arkansas" (from Raunch 'N' Roll Live)		Black Oak Arkansas	5:28
10.	"Dixie"	Traditional		4:00
11.	"Hot and Nasty" (from Raunch 'N' Roll Live)		Black Oak Arkansas	4:34
12.	"Up" (from Raunch 'N' Roll Live)			15:27
13.	"Movin'"		High on the Hog	5:35
Total length:				70:54

All tracks are written by Black Oak Arkansas.

Way Over Yonder: Paramount Theatre, Seattle, WA, 12/02/1972
No.	Title	Original album	Length
1.	"Gettin' Kinda Cocky" (from Raunch 'N' Roll Live)		3:55
2.	"Fever In My Mind"	Keep the Faith	4:04
3.	"Uncle Lijiah"	Black Oak Arkansas	3:27
4.	"Gigolo" (from Raunch 'N' Roll Live)		3:16
5.	"Mutants of the Monster" (from Raunch 'N' Roll Live)	If an Angel Came to See You, Would You Make Her Feel at Home?	6:26
6.	"Hot Rod" (from Raunch 'N' Roll Live)		5:41
7.	"Movin'"	High on the Hog	4:37
8.	"Full Moon Ride"	If an Angel Came to See You, Would You Make Her Feel at Home?	4:09
9.	"When Electricity Came To Arkansas"	Black Oak Arkansas	8:34
10.	"Hot and Nasty"	Black Oak Arkansas	4:27
11.	"Up"		12:23
Total length:			60:59

== Personnel ==
- Jim "Dandy" Mangrum – lead vocals
- Rickie Reynolds – 12-string rhythm guitar, vocals
- Harvey Jett – lead guitar, slide guitar, vocals
- Stanley Knight – lead guitar, vocals
- Pat Daugherty – bass guitar
- Tommy Aldridge – drums

== Production ==
Produced by Tom Dowd.
Recorded live in concert at the Paramount Theatres in Portland, Oregon (December 1, 1972) and Seattle, Washington (December 2, 1972).

== Charts ==
Chart (1973)	Peak position
US Billboard 200	90

== Certifications ==
Region	Certification	Certified units/sales
United States (RIAA)	Gold	500,000^{^}
^{^} Shipments figures based on certification alone.
