= Tommy Aldridge =

American drummer

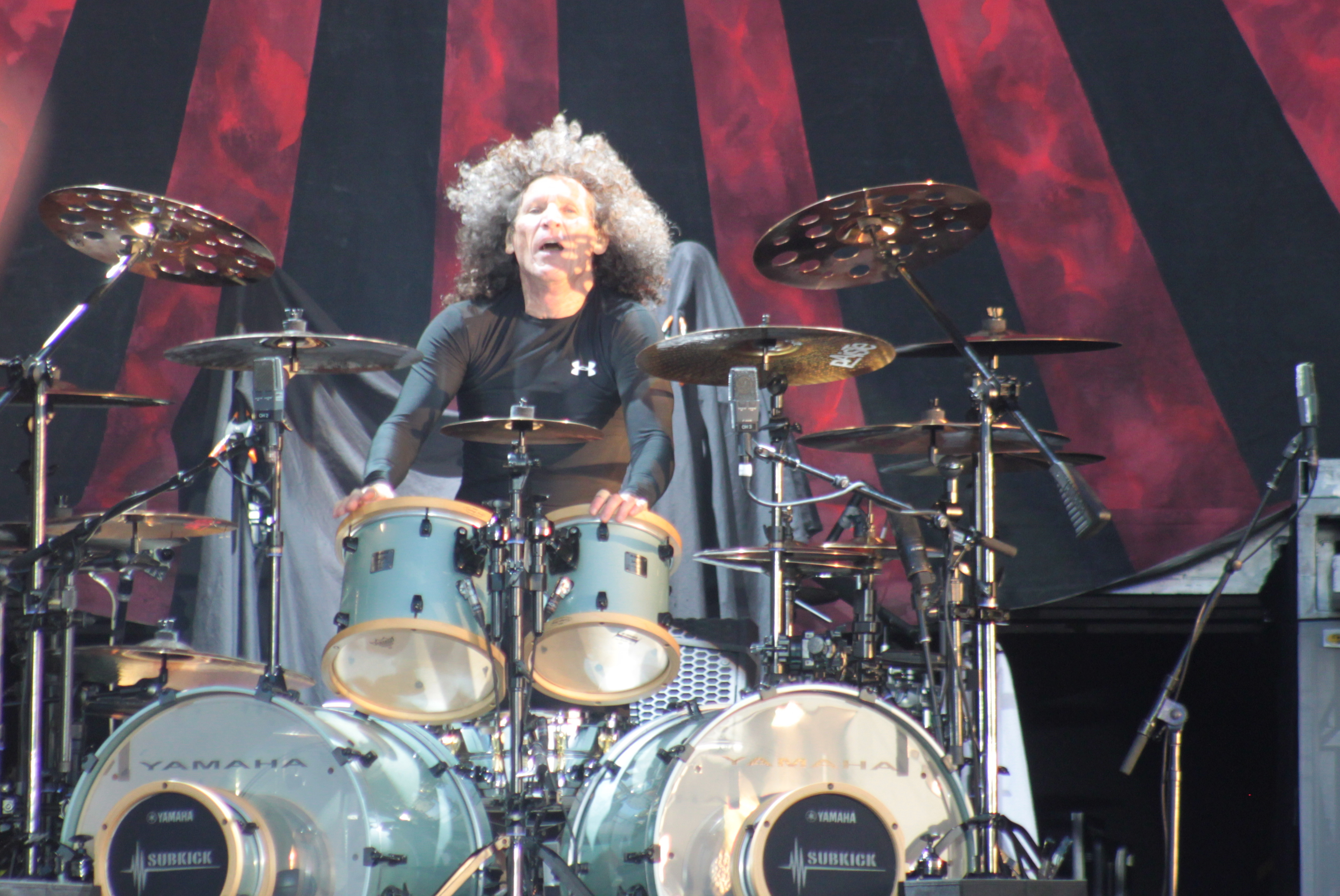
- Aldridge performing with Whitesnake in 2013

Background information
- Born: August 15, 1950 (age 76); Jackson, Mississippi, U.S.
- Genres: Hard rock; heavy metal; glam metal; blues rock
- Occupation: Drummer
- Years active: 1970–present
- Member of: ICONIC
- Website: https://www.aldridgeworld.com

Tommy Aldridge (born August 15, 1950) is an American heavy metal and hard rock drummer. He is noted for his work with numerous bands and artists since the 1970s, such as Black Oak Arkansas, Pat Travers Band, Ozzy Osbourne, Gary Moore, Whitesnake, Ted Nugent, Thin Lizzy, Vinnie Moore and Yngwie Malmsteen.

Self-taught, Aldridge was initially inspired by the music of Cream, the Beatles, Jimi Hendrix and Led Zeppelin. Drummers like Joe Morello, Ginger Baker, John Bonham and Mitch Mitchell were particularly influential as Aldridge developed his drumming style. Aldridge himself has become very influential and is regarded as a double bass drum pioneer in rock music.

== Career ==
Raised in Pearl, Mississippi, Aldridge taught himself to play drums in the 1960s, building a kit piece by piece with money earned delivering newspapers and other odd jobs. He credits his unique style to learning without the benefit of a mentor or teacher. While his mother was supportive of his desire to play music, his father, apparently, was not. In the early 1970s, Aldridge began playing original music with Alley Keith in the Florida Panhandle. Inspired by drummers such as Louis Bellson and Sam Woodyard, he started using a double-bass drum setup and became an early pioneer of the hard rock double kick drum style of drumming.

After playing for a short time with the southern rock band David and the Giants in 1972, Aldridge auditioned for Black Oak Arkansas and was surprised to get the job. He made his recording debut in 1972 with Black Oak Arkansas' If an Angel Came to See You, Would You Make Her Feel at Home? album. He subsequently recorded several albums with the band between 1972 and 1976 and toured extensively. Aldridge has said that he wasn't particularly fond of Black Oak Arkansas' music and his intention when joining the band was to use the opportunity as a springboard to make a name for himself in the industry, something he says he's not particularly proud of in hindsight. Not happy with the band's heavy use of hashish, Aldridge attempted to leave Black Oak Arkansas. As the band's management wasn't keen on giving him his contractual freedom, Aldridge was forced to sneak away in the middle of the night and subsequently "hide out in Chicago". During that period he played with a local band called "d'Thumbs". One and a half years of lawsuits ensued, after which he was contractually free to record again. Aldridge spent 1978 to 1981 with the Pat Travers Band, recording five albums over that time.

Upon parting ways with Travers in 1981, Aldridge moved to London, England and began working with Gary Moore, recording the Dirty Fingers album. American guitarist Randy Rhoads, who had recently arrived in England to record with Ozzy Osbourne, was a big fan of Moore's guitar playing, and one day he and Bob Daisley arrived to watch Moore's band rehearse. Aldridge and Rhoads became friends immediately. Aldridge had known Osbourne for several years, as Black Oak Arkansas had toured with Osbourne's previous band Black Sabbath extensively in the 1970s, and Aldridge's new friendship with Rhoads would lead him to join Ozzy Osbourne's band a few months later. Although Aldridge is credited in the liner notes and pictured on the inner sleeve of Ozzy Osbourne's 1981 album Diary of a Madman, Lee Kerslake actually performed all the drum parts on the original release. Aldridge has stated that working with Rhoads in Osbourne's band was one of the "musical highlights" of his life. Rhoads stated of Aldridge in late 1981 that "he was always my favorite drummer", stating that he was "knocked out" by the drummer after seeing him perform with Black Oak Arkansas on television in the 1970s. Aldridge appeared on Osbourne's Bark at the Moon album in 1983 as well as a pair of live albums (Speak of the Devil and Tribute) before leaving the band in 1984.

Soon after, Aldridge, along with bassist and former Ozzy Osbourne-bandmate Rudy Sarzo, joined forces with guitar/keyboard player Tony MacAlpine and vocalist Rob Rock to form a short-lived project called M.A.R.S. Close friends, Aldridge and Sarzo both joined Whitesnake in 1987 as the band prepared to tour in support of its multi-platinum selling Whitesnake album. Aldridge and Sarzo performed on the band's follow-up album, Slip of the Tongue, released in 1989. Announcing he was going to take a break from the music industry, Whitesnake frontman David Coverdale put the band on indefinite hiatus after the tour, and Aldridge moved on.

Following his stint in Whitesnake, Aldridge played in the band Manic Eden, with his former Whitesnake bandmates Adrian Vandenberg and Sarzo. The line-up also included former Little Caesar vocalist Ron Young.

During the 1990s Aldridge recorded and toured with various acts including Motörhead, House of Lords, Yngwie Malmsteen, John Sykes, and Ted Nugent. After playing on Pata's self-titled album, Aldridge joined Tim Bogert and James Christian on a November 1993 tour of Japan backing the guitarist.

Aldridge has been an in-demand drum clinician since the early 1980s, and much of his work involves drum clinics and festivals each year.

From 2002 Aldridge toured with Whitesnake alongside David Coverdale (vocals), Doug Aldrich (guitar), Reb Beach (guitar), Marco Mendoza/Uriah Duffy (bass) and Timothy Drury (keyboards). Aldridge left Whitesnake in 2007 to pursue alternate musical endeavours.

From 1997 to 2001 and again from 2007 to 2009, Aldridge was touring with the (former Whitesnake and Tygers of Pan Tang guitarist) John Sykes-fronted version of Thin Lizzy alongside Scott Gorham, Darren Wharton and Marco Mendoza.

Thin Lizzy, along with The Answer, were scheduled to support AC/DC at stadium shows in England, Ireland and Scotland at the end of June 2009 but these appearances were canceled after Aldridge broke his collarbone in an accident. On June 30, it was announced that Sykes had left Thin Lizzy and all shows for the rest of 2009 were canceled or postponed. Gorham stated that he would announce the band's future plans shortly. In May 2010, Thin Lizzy did not include Aldridge in the new line-up due to him still recovering from his injury. Original Thin Lizzy drummer Brian Downey returned to the band.

On January 25, 2013, it was announced that Aldridge had rejoined Whitesnake for the third time for the band's upcoming "Year of the Snake" tour. He has since recorded the albums Flesh & Blood and The Purple Album with the group and remains their drummer until Whitesnake's disbandment in November 2025.

As of 2026, Aldridge plays in the supergroup ICONIC featuring guitarists Michael Sweet and Joel Hoekstra, bassist Marco Mendoza, and vocalist Nathan James. The group has released two albums.

== Equipment ==
Aldridge plays Yamaha drums, a company he has been with since 1982. He has favored the Absolute Maple Nouveau series drums from Yamaha. Yamaha has made an Aldridge Signature Snare drum that is a 7x14 stainless steel model with die cast hoops and black chrome hardware. His kick drum pedals are fitted with Danmar 207A Tommy Aldridge pedal beaters. He uses Remo drum heads and Aldridge Signature Pro-Mark drum sticks. He notably sets his drum throne to sit very low (about 24.5 inches (62 cm)); he claims it is a result of sitting "on a couple of milk crates" when he was learning drums.

Aldridge also endorses Paiste cymbals, and has been a Paiste Artist since January 2003. His cymbal selection can vary, but he prefers their 2002, Signature and RUDE cymbals.

== Discography ==
=== Black Oak Arkansas ===
- If an Angel Came to See You, Would You Make Her Feel at Home? (1972)
- Raunch 'N' Roll Live (1973)
- High on the Hog (1973)
- Street Party (1974)
- Ain't Life Grand (1975)
- X-Rated (1975)
- Balls of Fire (1976)
- Live! Mutha (1976, recorded 1975)
- 10yr Over Night Success (1976)
- King Biscuit Flower Hour Presents Black Oak Arkansas (1998, recorded 1976)

=== Pat Travers Band ===
- Heat in the Street (1978)
- Live! Go for What You Know (1979)
- Crash and Burn (1980)
- Live in Concert (live 1977 and 1980)
- Radio Active (1981)

=== Gary Moore ===
- Dirty Fingers (1983, recorded 1980)
- Live at the Marquee (1983, recorded 1980)

=== Ozzy Osbourne ===
- Speak of the Devil (1982)
- Bark at the Moon (1983)
- Tribute (1987 but recorded in 1981/1980)
- Diary of a Madman 2011 'Legacy Edition' Disc 2 (2011 but recorded live in 1981)

=== Macalpine, Aldridge, Rock, Sarzo (MARS) ===
- Project: Driver (1986)

=== Whitesnake ===
- Slip of the Tongue (1989)
- Live... in the Shadow of the Blues (2006)
- Still...Good to Be Bad (2008; 2023 reissue) [Bonus tracks only]
- Live at Donington 1990 (2011)
- The Purple Album (2015)
- The Purple Tour (2017)
- Flesh & Blood (2019)
- Access All Areas: LIVE (2025)

=== Manic Eden ===
- Manic Eden (1994)

=== Others ===
- Hear 'n Aid - "Stars" (backing vocals only) (1986)
- Yngwie Malmsteen - Inspiration World Tour (1996) & Dragon Attack: A Tribute to Queen - Keep Yourself Alive
- Ruby Starr – Scene Stealer (1976)
- Vinnie Moore – Mind's Eye (1986)
- Motörhead – March ör Die (1992) - all tracks except "Hellraiser" and "I Ain't No Nice Guy"
- Steve Fister – Age of Great Dreams
- House of Lords – Demons Down (1992)
- Pata – Pata (1993)
- Dragon Attack: A Tribute to Queen (1997)
- Patrick Rondat – Amphibia (1996) & On the Edge (1999)
- Thin Lizzy – One Night Only (2000)
- Ted Nugent – Full Bluntal Nugity (2000)
- Chris Catena – Freak Out! (2004)
- John Sykes – 20th Century (1997)
- John Sykes - Bad Boy Live! (2004)
- Iconic – Second Skin (2022)
