= 2020 (Vandenberg album) =

Studio album by Vandenberg
- Released: May 29, 2020
- Recorded: 2019
- Genre: Hard rock; rock
- Length: 42:00
- Label: Mascot
- Producer: Jaap Eggermont

Vandenberg chronology
The Best of Vandenberg (1988)	2020 (2020)	Sin (2023)

2020 is the fourth studio album by Dutch hard rock band Vandenberg, released on 29 May 2020 by Mascot Records. It's the first Vandenberg studio album since Alibi in 1985.

== Track listing ==
Music and lyrics by Adrian Vandenberg

Side one

1. "Shadows of the Night" – 3:39
2. "Freight Train" – 3:45
3. "Hell and High Water" – 4:50
4. "Let It Rain" – 3:35
5. "Ride Like the Wind" – 4:03

Side two

6. "Shout" – 3:38
7. "Shitstorm" – 4:37
8. "Light Up the Sky" – 3:45
9. "Burning Heart 2020" – 4:43
10. "Skyfall" – 5:36

== Personnel ==
=== Band members ===
- Ronnie Romero – lead vocals
- Adrian Vandenberg – guitars, art direction
- Randy Van Der Elsen – bass guitar
- Koen Herfst – drums, percussion

=== Additional musicians ===
- Rudy Sarzo – bass (track 9)
- Brian Tichy - drums (track 9)
- Bob Marlette – keyboards

== Charts ==
Chart performance for 2020
Chart (2020)	Peak position
Belgian Albums (Ultratop Flanders)	49
Belgian Albums (Ultratop Wallonia)	162
Dutch Albums (Album Top 100)	2
German Albums (Offizielle Top 100)	50
Scottish Albums (OCC)	55
Swiss Albums (Schweizer Hitparade)	11
UK Independent Albums (OCC)	17
UK Rock & Metal Albums (OCC)	7
