= Schaefer Music Festival =

Music festival in New York City

- Poster for the Shaefer Music Festival, August 3, 1974
- Genre: Rock, folk, blues rock, folk rock, jazz rock, Latin rock, reggae
- Dates: June–September
- Locations: Wollman Rink, New York City (site of original festival), Pier 84, New York City
- Years active: 1967–1990
- Founders: Hilly Kristal, Ron Delsener

The Schaefer Music Festival in Central Park was a recurring music festival held in the summer between 1967 and 1976 at Wollman Rink in New York City's Central Park. It featured a number of notable performances. The sponsorship was taken over by Dr. Pepper in 1977 and the name changed to the Dr. Pepper Central Park Music Festival until the location of the festival was moved to Pier 84 in 1981 and the Wollman Skating Rink ceased being used as a concert venue.

== History ==
The festival was sponsored by Rheingold Breweries until 1968, when the task was handled by F. & M. Schaefer Brewing Company. The cost of the annual music festival was about $500,000, and admissions, at $1 per person in 1968, were expected to bring in $250,000 to $270,000 for the summer program, leaving a deficit, picked up by Schaefer, of more than $200,000. "Until Schaefer decided to assume sponsorship, the prospect was that the ticket price [from 1967] would have to be doubled. The $2, [Commissioner of Parks August Heckscher] said, would have been 'too expensive for a lot of New Yorkers.'"

In the 1960s, before the rise of corporate concert organizers and ticket agents, top rated bands would often play for free (especially in San Francisco) or for amounts that resulted in reasonable concert ticket prices. Just before the Schaefer Music Festival kicked off in the summer of 1968 a free concert was given in Central Park featuring the Grateful Dead, Jefferson Airplane and the Paul Butterfield Blues Band, three of the top acts at that time. 6,000 people "jammed into the bandstand near the [Central Park] Mall while thousands more sprawled out on the grass and under the trees."

Club owner and musician Hilly Kristal co-founded the series with producer and concert promoter Ron Delsener. Over the years a Who's Who of superstars of the popular music scene performed there. Inexpensive tickets, which started at $1 in 1967 and rose to only $3 by 1976, further contributed to the event's popularity. While the capacity of the Wollman Rink was usually limited to about 6,000 to 7,000 people, it is reported that Bob Marley's performance in 1975 had attracted about 15,000 people.

In 1977, Dr. Pepper assumed sponsorship of the Central Park concert series, renamed the Dr. Pepper Central Park Music Festival. Due to residential noise complaints, this series was moved to Pier 84 on the West Side in 1981. The festival name was changed to Dr. Pepper Music Festival after the move away from Central Park in 1981. In 1983 Miller Brewing Company took over sponsorship with the name Miller Time Concerts on the Pier until 1988. In 1989 Reebok took over sponsorship of the concert series at Pier 84, renamed Reebok Riverstage, which lasted through 1990.

== Good Vibrations from Central Park (1971) ==
During the 1971 music festival, concerts on July 2 and July 3 were filmed for an ABC-TV special. The performers included Carly Simon, who made her TV debut, Ike & Tina Turner, Kate Taylor, Boz Scaggs, and the Beach Boys. Art Garfunkel and George Harrison also appear as non-performers. The concert aired as Good Vibrations From Central Park on August 19, 1971.

== Festival line-ups ==
=== 1967 ===
- July 5: The Young Rascals; The Jimi Hendrix Experience; Len Chandler
- July 7: Phil Ochs

=== 1968 ===
- June 27: Count Basie Orchestra; Joe Williams
- June 28: The Crazy World of Arthur Brown
- June 29: Moby Grape; Muddy Waters
- July 1: Mongo Santamaria; Hugh Masekela
- July 3: Mitch Ryder; Spirit
- July 5: Sarah Vaughan; Herbie Mann
- July 6: Nina Simone; The People's Choice
- July 8: Ray Charles Orchestra & The Raelettes
- July 12: Pete Seeger; Len Chandler
- July 13: Montego Joe Septet; Sergio Mendes & Brazil '66
- July 17: Indrani's Indian Music & Dance Festival w/ Ali Akbar Khan
- July 20: (postponed from July 19) Indrani's Indian Music & Dance Festival w/ Ali Akbar Khan
- July 21: Indrani's Indian Music & Dance Festival w/ Ali Akbar Khan
- July 22: Chrysalis; Rosko (poetry); Theodore Bikel (filling in for Janis Ian)
- July 24: Vanilla Fudge; Ultimate Spinach
- July 26: Richie Havens; (Seals and Crofts?)
- July 27: Duke Ellington Orchestra
- August 1: B.B. King; Fats Domino
- August 3: Frank Zappa & The Mothers of Invention; Buddy Guy
- August 5: Lou Rawls; Joe Keyes
- August 7: The Who; Mandala
- August 9: George Shearing Quintet; Amanda Ambrose; Hal Waters
- August 10: Flip Wilson; Little Anthony & the Imperials
- August 12: Jimmy Smith; Gloria Lynne
- August 14: Joni Mitchell; Arlo Guthrie
- August 16: Tom Paxton; Patrick Sky
- August 17: The Chambers Brothers; Little Richard
- August 19: Traffic; Tim Buckley
- August 21: Country Joe and the Fish; Eric Andersen
- August 23: Judy Collins
- August 24: Herbie Mann; Cal Tjader

=== 1969 ===
- June 26: Benny Goodman; Lionel Hampton
- June 27: Tiny Tim; Sweetwater
- June 28: The Crazy World of Arthur Brown; Rhinoceros
- June 30: Flip Wilson; Modern Jazz Quartet
- July 2: Jerry Lee Lewis; Pacific Gas & Electric
- July 5: Hugh Masekela; Willie Bobo
- July 7: Miles Davis; Thelonious Monk
- July 9: Blood, Sweat & Tears; Carolyn Hester
- July 11: Herbie Mann; Eddie Harris
- July 12: The Byrds; Chuck Berry; John Lee Hooker
- July 14: Jeff Beck; Orpheus
- July 16: Ten Years After; Fleetwood Mac; Spencer Davis Group
- July 18: Buffy Sainte-Marie; Cashman, Pistilli & West
- July 19: Cannonball Adderley; The Sweet Inspirations
- July 21: Led Zeppelin; B. B. King
- July 23: Joni Mitchell; Tim Hardin
- July 25: Mongo Santamaría; Cal Tjader; Ray Barretto; Chucho Avellanet
- July 26: Sly and the Family Stone; Slim Harpo
- July 27: Carlos Montoya; Paul Winter
- July 28: Paul Butterfield Blues Band; Jethro Tull
- July 30: Buddy Rich; Procol Harum
- August 1: The Beach Boys; Neil Young
- August 2: Frank Zappa & The Mothers of Invention; Buddy Guy
- August 4: Dizzy Gillespie; Carmen McRae
- August 6: Little Richard; The Checkmates, Ltd.
- August 8: Tom Paxton; Gordon Lightfoot
- August 9: Herbie Mann; Roy Ayers; Sonny Sharrock
- August 11: Arlo Guthrie; Melanie
- August 15: Al Kooper; James Cotton
- August 16: Lou Rawls; Carl Holmes and the Commanders; Ruth McFadden
- August 18: Nina Simone; Montego Joe
- August 22: Tim Buckley; Times Square
- August 23: Sam & Dave; Patti LaBelle & The Bluebelles

=== 1970 ===
- June 25: Ray Charles & The Raelettes
- June 27: Buddy Rich & Chase
- June 29: The Band
- July 1: Les McCann & Eddie Harris; Roberta Flack
- July 3: The Four Seasons
- July 6: Miles Davis Septet; Buddy Miles (Buddy Miles was replaced by Lee Michaels)
- July 8: Mongo Santamaría; Cal Tjader; Ray Barretto
- July 10: Tom Rush; Melanie
- July 13: Ike & Tina Turner; Carly Simon; The Voices of East Harlem
- July 15: Four Tops; Eddie Holman
- July 17: Stan Kenton; Four Freshmen; Chris Connor
- July 18: Little Richard; Wayne Cochran and the C.C. Riders
- July 20: Van Morrison; The Byrds
- July 22: Arlo Guthrie
- July 24: Great Speckled Bird; Ian & Sylvia; Tom Paxton
- July 25: La Lupe; Joe Bataan
- July 27: Peggy Lee
- July 29: John Sebastian; The Manhattan Transfer
- July 31: Iron Butterfly
- August 1: Dave Brubeck feat. Paul Desmond; Dakota Staton
- August 3: Jethro Tull
- August 5: Delaney & Bonnie feat. Duane Allman Herbie Mann; Seals & Crofts and The Guess Who
- August 7: Johnny Mathis
- August 8: The Impressions; Patti LaBelle & The Bluebelles
- August 10: Judy Collins
- August 12: The Supremes; The Meters
- August 14: The Everly Brothers; John Denver
- August 15: Sam & Dave; Jam Factory
- August 17: Mountain
- August 21: Kathy McCord
- August 22: Fleetwood Mac; Bloodrock; Zephyr

=== 1971 ===
- June 24: Nancy Wilson; Thad Jones & Mel Lewis
- June 28: Buddy Rich; Chase
- June 30: The Band; Happy Traum; Artie Traum
- July 2: Ike & Tina Turner; the Beach Boys; Kate Taylor; Boz Scaggs; Carly Simon (filmed for TV special)
- July 3: Ike & Tina Turner; the Beach Boys; Kate Taylor; Boz Scaggs; Carly Simon (filmed for TV special)
- July 7: Mongo Santamaría; Herbie Mann; Roy Ayers
- July 9: Ravi Shankar
- July 10: Melanie; Janey & Dennis
- July 12: Ella Fitzgerald; Oscar Peterson
- July 14: The Supremes
- July 16: Poco; Jerry Riopelle
- July 17: The Byrds; JF Murphy and Salt
- July 19: Peggy Lee
- July 21: The Allman Brothers Band; Cowboy
- July 23: The Four Seasons; Jay and the Americans
- July 24: Cal Tjader; Willie Bobo; Joe Cuba
- July 26: Mary Travers
- July 28: Roberta Flack; Donal Leace
- August 2: Judy Collins
- August 4: Delaney & Bonnie; John Hammond
- August 6: Sha Na Na; The Voices of East Harlem
- August 7: Dave Brubeck feat. Gerry Mulligan / Paul Desmond, Chico Hamilton
- August 9: Kris Kristofferson; Janis Ian; Chris Gantry
- August 11: Seatrain; Moby Grape
- August 13: Robert Klein; Tom Paxton; Bert Sommer; Tony Joe White; Bobby Gosh; Carol Hall; Jonathan Edwards
- August 14: Les McCann; Cannonball Adderley; Queen Esther Marrow
- August 16: Procol Harum; Mylon LeFevre
- August 18: Robert Klein; John Denver; Dion; Jackie Lomax; Bonnie Raitt; The Quinaimes Band
- August 20: Paul Butterfield Blues Band; James Cotton
- August 21: The Chambers Brothers; Mandrill
- August 23: Seals & Crofts; Earl Scruggs; Jerry Corbitt; The Charlie Daniels Band
- August 25: David Steinberg; Carly Simon
- August 27: The Five Satins; Screamin' Jay Hawkins; The Coasters
- August 28: Little Richard; The Orioles; The Harptones; The Jive Five

=== 1972 ===
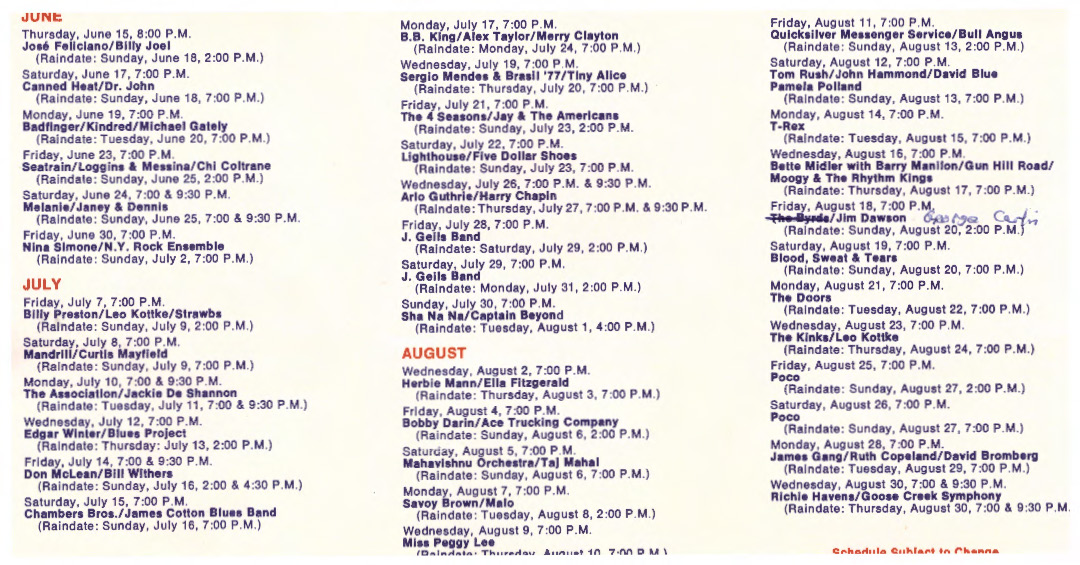
1972 Concert Schedule

- June 15: José Feliciano; Billy Joel
- June 17: Canned Heat; Dr. John the Night Tripper
- June 20: Badfinger; Kindred; Michael Gately
- June 23: Seatrain; Loggins & Messina; Chi Coltrane
- June 24: Melanie; Janey & Dennis
- June 30: Nina Simone; New York Rock & Roll Ensemble
- July 7: Billy Preston; Leo Kottke; The Strawbs
- July 8: Mandrill; Curtis Mayfield 7 p.m.; The Association / Jackie DeShannon 9:30 p.m.
- July 12: Edgar Winter; Blues Project
- July 14: Don McLean; Bill Withers
- July 15: The Chambers Brothers; James Cotton Blues Band
- July 17: B.B. King; Alex Taylor; Merry Clayton
- July 19: Sérgio Mendes & Brasil '77
- July 21: An Evening of Gold w/ The Four Seasons; Jay & The Americans
- July 22: Lighthouse; Five Dollar Shoes
- July 26: Arlo Guthrie; Harry Chapin
- July 28: J. Geils Band; Heads Hands & Feet
- July 29: J. Geils Band; Heads Hands & Feet
- July 30: Sha Na Na; Tiny Alice; Captain Beyond
- Aug. 2: Ella Fitzgerald; Herbie Mann
- Aug. 4: Bobby Darin; Ace Trucking Company
- Aug 5: Mahavishnu Orchestra; Taj Mahal
- Aug. 7: Savoy Brown; Malo
- Aug 9: Peggy Lee
- Aug. 11: Quicksilver Messenger Service; Bull Angus; Pure Food and Drug Act
- Aug. 12: Tom Rush; David Blue; Pamela Polland
- Aug. 14: Slade and Looking Glass played, Marc Bolan of T-Rex being ill.
- Aug. 16: Bette Midler; Gunhill Road; Moogy and the Rhythm Kings
- Aug. 18: Jim Dawson
- Aug. 19: Blood, Sweat & Tears; Chris Smither; Orphan
- Aug. 21: The Doors; Flo & Eddie
- Aug. 23: The Kinks; Orleans
- Aug. 25: Poco
- Aug. 26: Poco
- Aug. 28: James Gang; Ruth Copeland; David Bromberg
- Aug. 30: Richie Havens; Goose Creek Symphony
- Sept. 1: Ginger Baker; Buddy Miles
- Sept. 2: Ginger Baker; Buddy Miles

=== 1973 ===
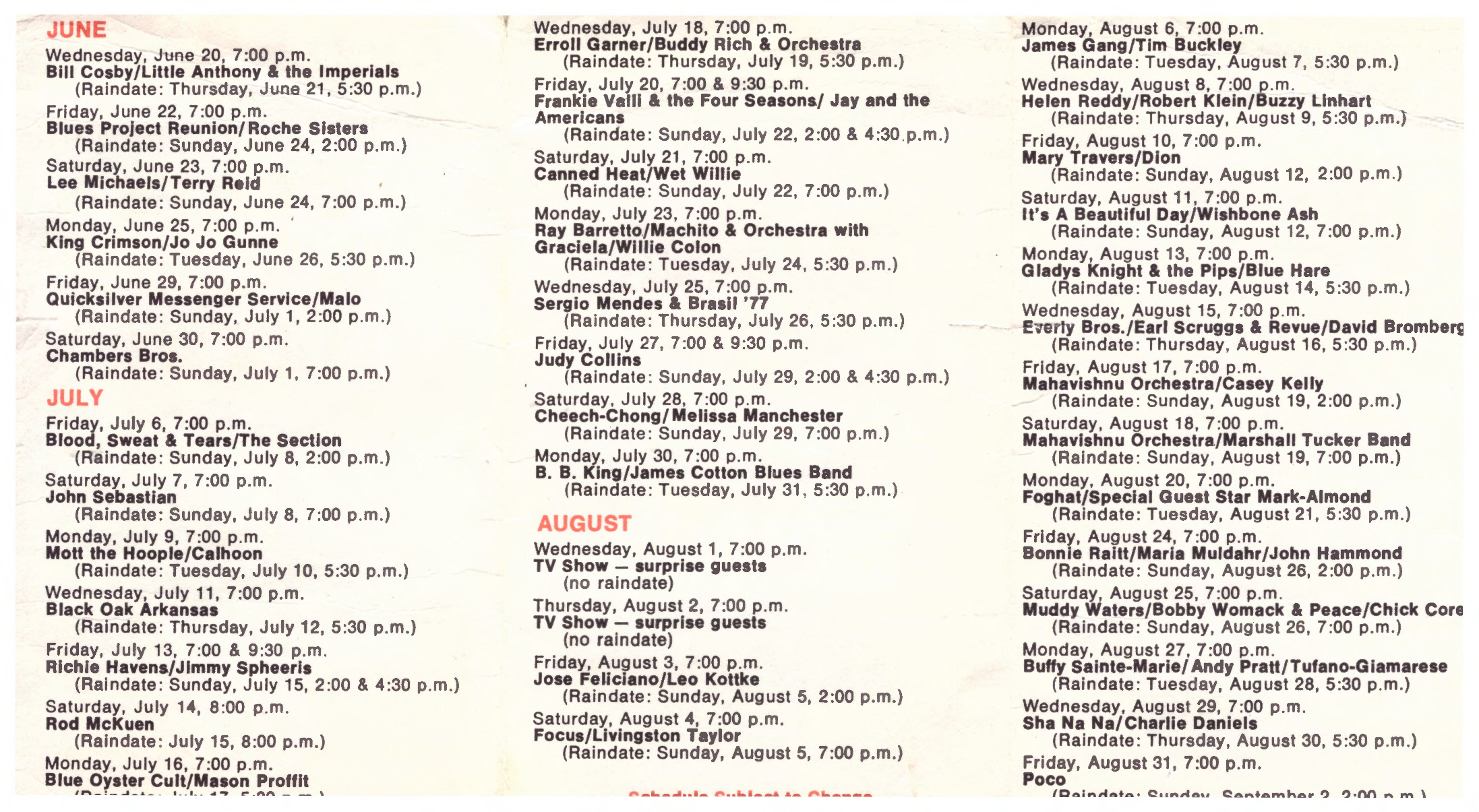
1973 Concert Schedule

- June 20: Bill Cosby; Little Anthony & the Imperials
- June 22: Blues Project Reunion; Roche Sisters
- June 23: Lee Michaels; Terry Reid
- June 25: King Crimson; Jo Jo Gunne
- June 29: Quicksilver Messenger Service; Malo
- June 30: The Chambers Brothers; Sons of Champlin
- July 6: Blood, Sweat & Tears; The Section
- July 7: John Sebastian
- July 9: Ruben and the Jets; Deodato; Calhoon (Mott the Hoople was originally scheduled to play on this date)
- July 11: Black Oak Arkansas; Mason Proffit
- July 13: Richie Havens; Jimmie Spheeris
- July 14: Rod McKuen
- July 16: Blue Öyster Cult; Andy Pratt
- July 18: Erroll Garner; Buddy Rich & Orchestra
- July 20: Frankie Valli & the Four Seasons; Jay and the Americans
- July 21: Marshall Tucker Band (Canned Heat and Wet Willie were originally scheduled to play on this date)
- July 23: Ray Barretto; Machito & Orchestra with Graciela; Willie Colón
- July 25: Sérgio Mendes & Brasil '77
- July 27: Judy Collins
- July 28: Cheech & Chong; Melissa Manchester
- July 30: B.B. King; James Cotton Blues Band
- August 1: TV Show, w/ the Eagles; John Sebastian; Sly and the Family Stone; The Temptations, and Melissa Manchester
- August 2: TV Show, w/ the Eagles; John Sebastian; Sly and the Family Stone; The Temptations, and Melissa Manchester
- August 3: José Feliciano; Leo Kottke
- August 4: Focus; Elephant's Memory (Leo Kottke was originally scheduled to play on this date)
- August 6: James Gang; Tim Buckley; Ralph McTell (7:30 PM show)
- August 6: Leslie West's Wild West Show w/ Mitch Ryder; Mitch Ryder & Band (10 PM show) (10cc was originally scheduled to play on this date)
- August 8: Helen Reddy; Robert Klein; Buzzy Linhart
- August 10: Mary Travers; Dion
- August 11: Wishbone Ash; Jimmy and Vella Cameron; Joe Walsh and Barnstorm (It's a Beautiful Day was originally scheduled to play on this date)
- August 13: Gladys Knight & the Pips; Blue Hare
- August 15: Earl Scruggs and Revue; David Bromberg; Doc Watson (The Everly Brothers were originally scheduled to play on this date, but they had split up in July)
- August 17: Mahavishnu Orchestra; Casey Kelly
- August 18: Mahavishnu Orchestra; Wet Willie (The Marshall Tucker Band was originally scheduled to play on this date)
- August 20: Robin Trower; Mark-Almond; Foghat
- August 24: Bonnie Raitt; Maria Muldaur; John P. Hammond
- August 24: Muddy Waters; Bobby Womack & Peace; Chick Corea
- August 27: Buffy Sainte-Marie; Chip Taylor
- August 29: Charlie Daniels; Sha Na Na (7 PM and 9:30 PM shows; Sha Na Na only at 9:30 show)
- August 31: Poco; David Blue
- September 1: Poco; David Blue
- September 5: The Edgar Winter Group (The Eagles were originally scheduled to play on this date)
- September 7: Buddy Miles Express; The Incredible Bongo Band (Billy Preston and Labelle were originally scheduled to play on this date)
- September 8: Dave Mason

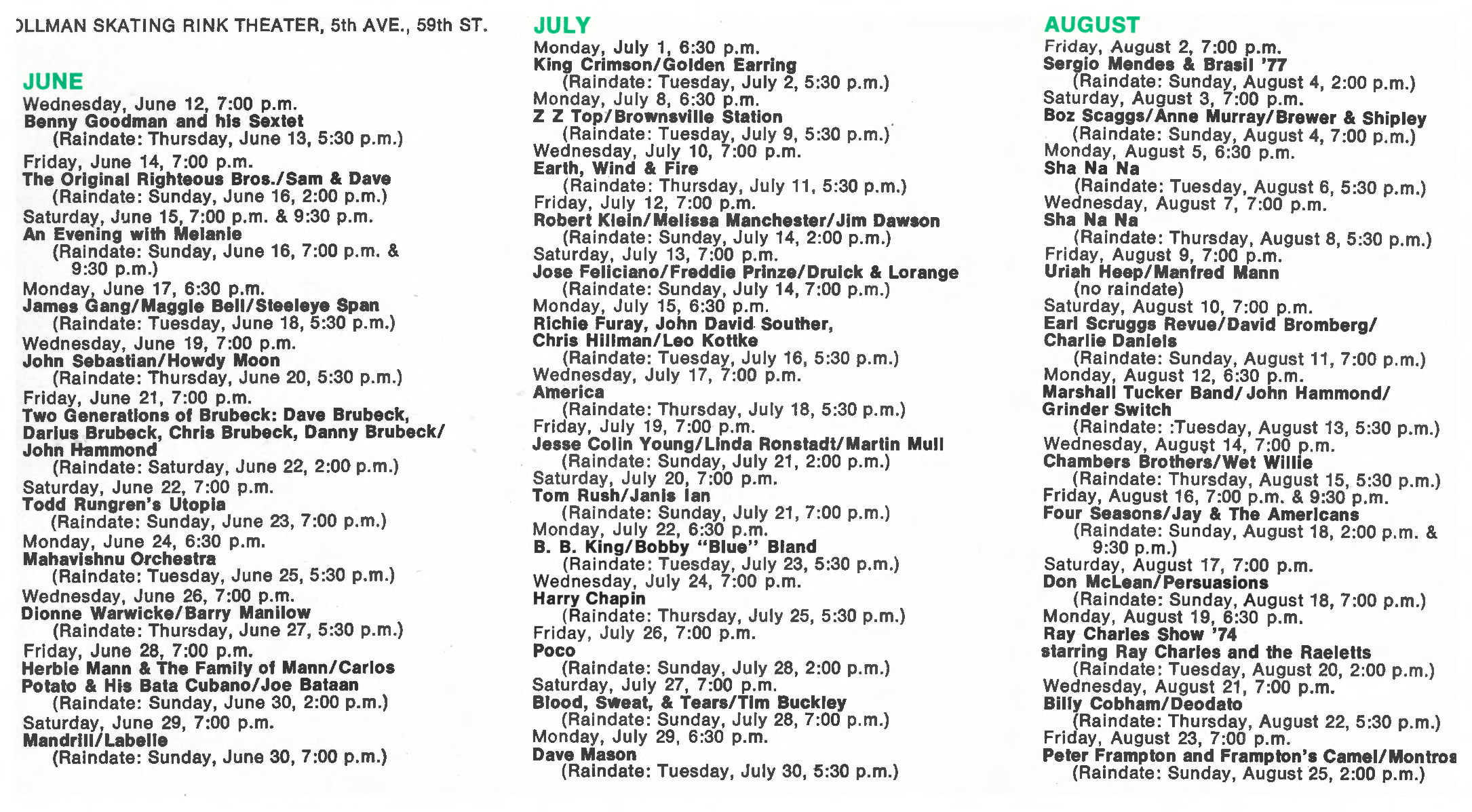
1974 Concert Schedule

=== 1974 ===
- June 12: Benny Goodman and his Sextet
- June 14: The Original Righteous Brothers; Sam & Dave (7 PM and 9:30 PM)
- June 15: An Evening with Melanie (7 PM and 9:30 PM)
- June 17: James Gang; Maggie Bell; Duke Williams and the Extremes
- June 19: Steeleye Span, Bonnie Raitt w/ John Hall, Howdy Moon (John Sebastian was originally scheduled to play on this date)
- June 21: Two Generations of Brubeck: Dave Brubeck, Darius Brubeck, Chris Brubeck, Danny Brubeck; John P. Hammond
- June 22: Todd Rundgren's Utopia (w/ Special Guest Chaka Khan)
- June 24: Mahavishnu Orchestra
- June 25: Dionne Warwicke; Barry Manilow; Jane Olivor, likely billed then as Janie Olivor
- June 28: Herbie Mann & The Family of Mann; Carlos Patato & His Bata Cubano; Joe Bataan
- June 29: Mandrill; Labelle
- July 1: King Crimson; Golden Earring
- July 8: ZZ Top; Brownsville Station
- July 10: Bobby Womack and Peace; Bloodstone; Minnie Ripperton (Earth, Wind & Fire was originally scheduled to play on this date)
- July 12: Robert Klein; Melissa Manchester; Jim Dawson
- July 13: José Feliciano; Freddie Prinze; Druick & Lorange
- July 15: Souther Hillman Furay Band; Leo Kottke
- July 17: America; Ian Matthews
- July 19: Linda Ronstadt; Martin Mull (Jesse Colin Young was originally scheduled to play on this date)
- July 20: Tom Rush; Janis Ian
- July 22: B.B. King; Bobby Blue Bland
- July 24: Harry Chapin
- July 26: Poco; Snafu
- July 27: Blood, Sweat & Tears, Tim Buckley
- July 29: Dave Mason; Premiata Forneria Marconi
- August 3: Anne Murray; Bruce Springsteen; Brewer & Shipley (Boz Scaggs was originally scheduled to play on this date)
- August 9: Uriah Heep; Manfred Mann
- August 10: David Bromberg
- August 12: Marshall Tucker Band
- August 17: Don McLean
- August 23: Peter Frampton; Snafu
- August 31: Premiata Forneria Marconi
- September 3: John Sebastian
- September 4: Foghat; Bad Company
- September 7: Rory Gallagher; Aerosmith

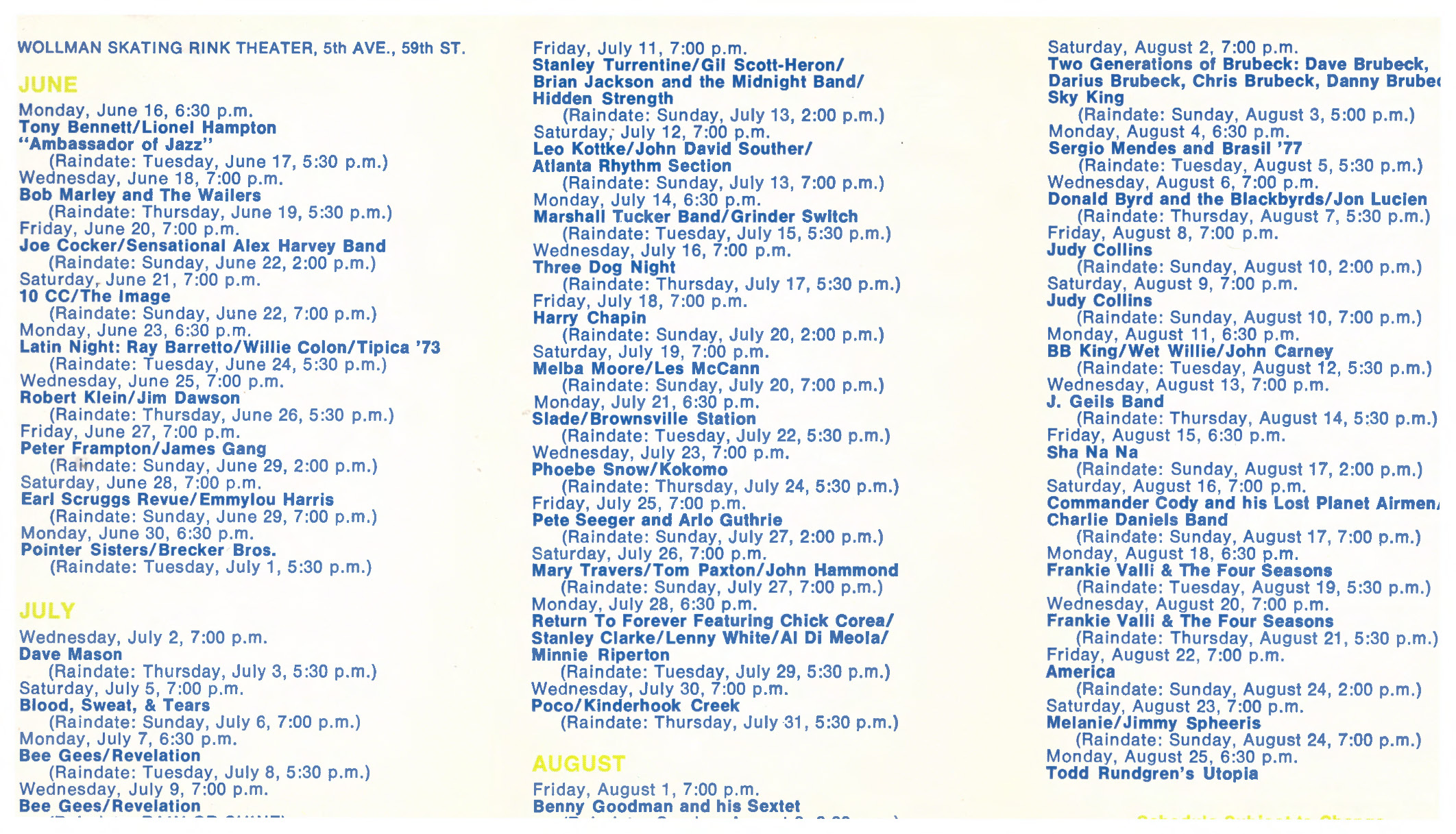
1975 Concert Schedule

=== 1975 ===
- June 18: Bob Marley & The Wailers
- June 20: Journey
- June 21: Montrose; Leslie West; Thee Image
- June 25: Mirabai; Jim Dawson; Robert Klein
- July 2: Dave Mason; Pousette-Dart Band
- July 5: Blood, Sweat & Tears
- July 9: Bee Gees w/ Revelation
- July 14: The Marshall Tucker Band
- July 16: Three Dog Night
- July 21: Brownsville Station; Slade
- July 23: Hot Tuna
- July 27: James Gang; Peter Frampton
- July 28: Return to Forever: Chick Corea, Al Di Meola, Stanley Clarke, Lenny White
- July 30: Poco / Kinderhook Creek
- August 9: Judy Collins
- August 13: The J. Geils Band; Ruby Starr; Roomful of Blues
- August 16: The Charlie Daniels Band; Commander Cody and His Lost Planet Airmen
- August 22: Poco; Deadly Nightshade
- August 24: America
- August 25: Utopia; Todd Rundgren
- August 27: CTI Summer Jazz; Grover Washington Jr., George Benson, Chet Baker, Bob James, Ron Carter, Hubert Laws, Hank Crawford, Joe Farrell
- August 29: Aerosmith; Ted Nugent
- September 3: Uriah Heep
- September 5: Miles Davis
- September 6: Richie Havens
- September 10: Jean-Luc Ponty
- September 12: Melissa Manchester; Barry Manilow
- September 13: John Sebastian; Lori Lieberman; California English
- September 14: Roy Buchanan; Forest Green; NRBQ

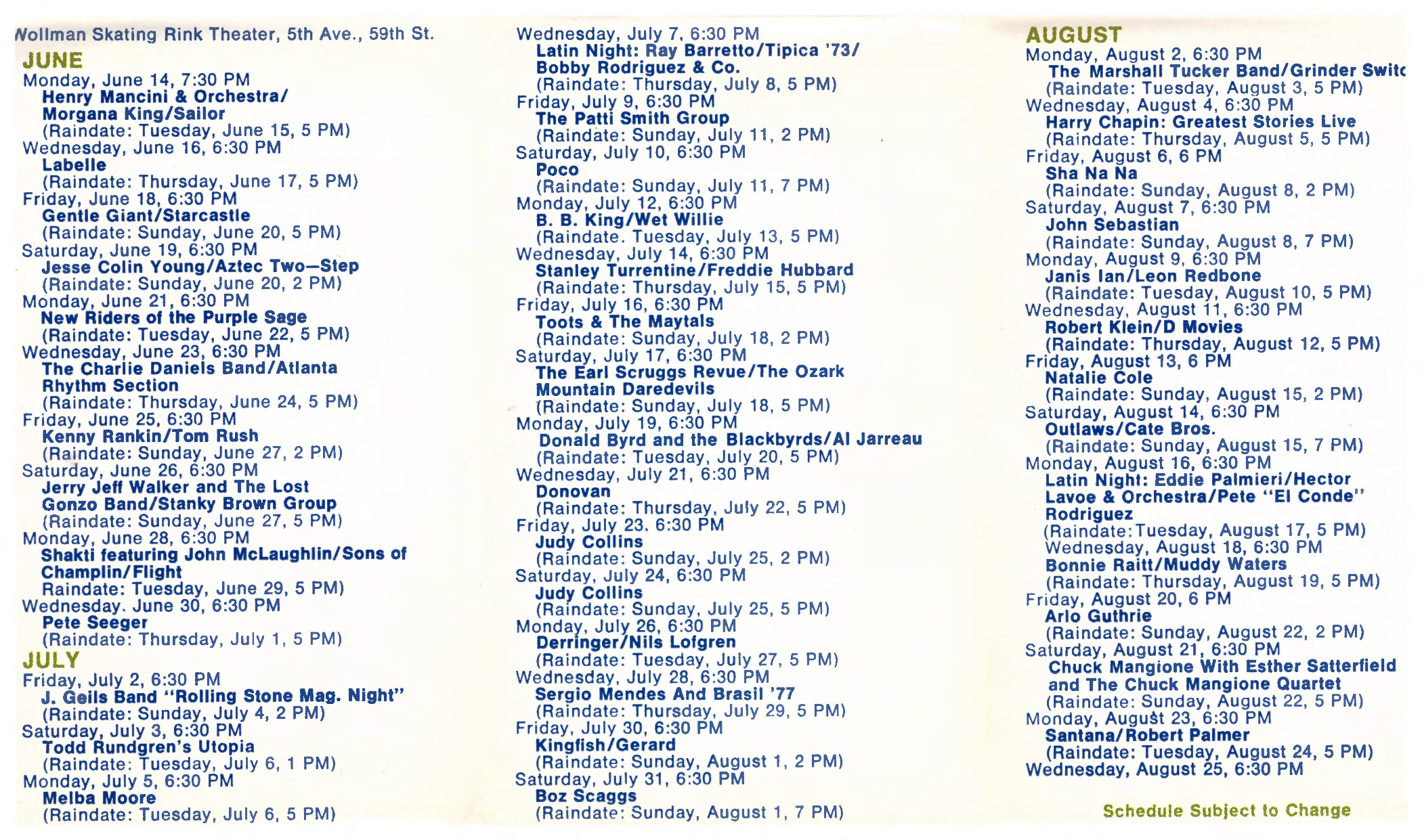
1976 Concert Schedule

=== 1976 ===
- June 14: Henry Mancini & Orchestra; Morgana King; Sailor
- June 16: Labelle
- June 18: Gentle Giant; Starcastle
- June 19: Jesse Colin Young; Aztec Two-Step
- June 21: New Riders of the Purple Sage
- June 23: Atlanta Rhythm Section; The Charlie Daniels Band
- June 25: Kenny Rankin; Tom Rush
- June 26: Jerry Jeff Walker and The Lost Gonzo Band; Stanky Brown Group
- June 28: Flight; Sons of Champlin; Shakti & John McLaughlin
- June 30: Pete Seeger
- July 3: Cheech & Chong; Utopia
- July 9: Patti Smith
- July 12: B.B. King
- July 19: Donald Byrd & The Blackbyrds
- July 21: Donovan; Giba
- July 26: Nils Lofgren; Rick Derringer
- July 30: Gerard; Kingfish feat. Bob Weir
- July 31: Boz Scaggs; Maxine Nightingale
- August 2: Grinderswitch; The Marshall Tucker Band
- August 4: Harry Chapin
  Schaefer Music Festival Ticket 1976Aug04 - Harry Chapin
- August 6: Sha Na Na
- August 7: John Sebastian
- August 9: Janis Ian; Leon Redbone
- August 11: Robert Klein; D Movies
- August 13: Natalie Cole
- August 14: John Hammond; The Cate Brothers; Outlaws
- August 16: Latin Night: Eddie Palmieri, Hector Lavoe & Orchestra,
- August 20: Arlo Guthrie
- August 21: Chuck Mangione with Esther Satterfield
- August 23: Santana; Robert Palmer
- August 25: Santana;
- August 27: CTI Summer Jazz: Grover Washington Jr., Hank Crawford, Esther Phillips
- August 28: CTI Summer Jazz: Grover Washington Jr., Hank Crawford, Esther Phillips
- August 30: Jimmy Cliff
- September 1: Diane Scanlon; Gary Wright; Frank Marino & Mahogany Rush; Johnny & Edgar Winter
- September 3: Foghat; Diane Scanlon
- September 4: David Bromberg; Vassar Clements
- September 8: David Crosby; Graham Nash
- September 10: David Crosby; Graham Nash
- September 11: David Crosby; Graham Nash

== See also ==
- List of historic rock festivals
- List of blues festivals
