= Jim Dandy (disambiguation) =

"Jim Dandy" is a 1955 song by American rhythm and blues singer LaVern Baker.

Jim Dandy may also refer to:

== Horse racing ==
- Jim Dandy Stakes, an American Thoroughbred horse race
- Jim Dandy (horse), the upset winner of the 1930 Travers Stakes, after whom the Jim Dandy Stakes is named

== People ==
- Jim Dandy (singer) (born 1948), vocalist for Black Oak Arkansas

== See also ==
- James Edgar Dandy (1903–1976), British botanist
