= Dragon Attack: A Tribute to Queen =

Compilation album by Various Artists
- Released: January 21, 1997
- Studio: The Office; Clamsville; Deep Cuttin'; Dream Factory; Work Shop
- Genre: Heavy metal; hard rock; progressive rock
- Label: De-Rock
- Producer: Billy Sherwood

Dragon Attack: Tribute to Queen is a Queen tribute album produced in 1997. Like most tribute albums, it features cover versions of many Queen songs by various artists, but uniquely the songs are not performed by established groups. Instead, the album is performed by a group of musicians who normally perform with other groups or artists, in different combinations for each track.

Notable artists featured on the album include Yngwie Malmsteen, John Petrucci, Robby Krieger, the Kulick brothers and Lemmy. The musicians involved come mainly from a metal background, having performed with the likes of Motörhead, Deep Purple, Impellitteri, Meat Loaf, Kiss, Alice Cooper, Dream Theater, Megadeth, Quiet Riot, Hawaii, Cacophony, Ozzy Osbourne, Whitesnake and Black Sabbath.

The album was re-released in the UK as Top Musicians Play Queen: The Collectors Collection with "Keep Yourself Alive" omitted and a 2010 recording of "Bohemian Rhapsody", with John Wetton on vocals, added.

Chris Impellitteri is incorrectly listed on the cover as 'Chris Impelletteri'.

== Track listing ==
1. I Want It All – Vocal: Robin McAuley; Lead Guitar: Chris Impellitteri; Rhythm Guitar: Bob Kulick; Keyboards: Edward Harris Roth; Drums: Jay Schellen
2. Sheer Heart Attack – Vocal: James LaBrie; Lead and Rhythm Guitar: Marty Friedman; Bass: Tony Franklin; Drums: Carmine Appice
3. Another One Bites the Dust – Vocal: Adam Paskowitz; Lead and Rhythm Guitar: John Petrucci; Bass: Rudy Sarzo; Drums: Tommy Aldridge
4. Save Me – Vocal: Jeff Scott Soto; Lead Guitar: Bruce Kulick; Piano: Michael Sherwood; Bass: Ricky Philips; Drums: Eric Singer
5. We Will Rock You – Vocal: Paul Shortino; Lead & Rhythm Guitar: Bob Kulick; Drums: Jay Schellen; Backing Vocals: Matt Laurent, Nick Dio
6. We Are the Champions – Vocal: Paul Shortino; Lead Guitar: Robby Krieger; Rhythm Guitar: Bob Kulick; Piano: Michael Sherwood; Bass: Tony Franklin; Drums: Carmine Appice; Backing Vocals: Matt Laurent, Nick Dio
7. Tie Your Mother Down – Vocal: Lemmy; Lead Guitar: Ted Nugent; Rhythm Guitar: Lemmy, Bob Kulick; Bass: Rudy Sarzo; Drums: Tommy Aldridge
8. Get Down Make Love – Vocal: Glenn Hughes; Lead Guitar: Jake E. Lee; Rhythm Guitar: Bob Kulick; Piano & Organ: Billy Sherwood; Bass: Tony Franklin; Drums: Carmine Appice
9. Keep Yourself Alive – Vocal: Mark Boals; Lead and Rhythm Guitar: Yngwie Malmsteen; Bass: Rudy Sarzo; Drums: Tommy Aldridge
10. One Vision – Vocal: James LaBrie; Lead & Rhythm Guitar: Bruce Bouillet; Rhythm Guitar: Bob Kulick; Bass: Ricky Phillips; Drums: Jay Schellen
11. It's Late – Vocal: John Bush; Lead Guitars: Scott Ian and Zachary Throne; Bass: Joey Vera; Drums: Jason Ian; Additional Vocals: Scott Ian, Jason Ian, Joey Vera and Zachary Throne
12. Love of My Life (bonus track, only on Japanese release) – Vocal and Guitar: Mark Slaughter; Acoustic Guitar: Bob Kulick; Piano and Harp: Michael Sherwood; Bass and Percussion: Billy Sherwood
