= Kulich (disambiguation) =

Kulich is a village in Kurdistan Province, Iran.

Kulich may also refer to:

- Kulich (surname)
- Kulich (bread), Eastern-Orthodox Easter bread

== See also ==
- Kulič (disambiguation)
- Kulić, surname
- Kulic (disambiguation)
