= Jam Factory =

Jam Factory may refer to:

- Jam Factory (band), an American soul music group from Syracuse, New York, active in the 1970s
- Jam Factory (music publisher), a South Korean music publisher
- The Jam Factory, a shopping and entertainment centre in the Melbourne suburb of South Yarra, Victoria, Australia
- JamFactory, a non-profit arts organisation in Adelaide, South Australia (formerly spelt Jam Factory) providing training and retail in craft and design objects
