= Kulič (disambiguation) =

Kulič is a village in the municipality of Smederevo, Serbia.

Kulič may also refer to:

- Kulič Fortress
- Marek Kulič (born 1975), Czech footballer
- Kulich (bread), Eastern-Orthodox Easter bread

== See also ==
- Kulich (disambiguation)
- Kulić, surname
- Kulic (disambiguation)
