= Street Party =

Street Party may refer to:

- Street party
- Street Party (TV series), a music video program on MTV
- Street Party (Black Oak Arkansas album), 1974
- Street Party (The Mellow Fellows album), 1990
