= Kulic (disambiguation) =

Kulic may refer to:

- Kulič (disambiguation)
- Kulić, surname

== See also ==
- Kulich (disambiguation)
