= Manic Eden =

UK musical group (1993–1994)

- Genres: Hard rock
- Years active: 1993–1994
- Past members: Adrian Vandenberg; Rudy Sarzo; Tommy Aldridge; James Christian; Ron Young

Manic Eden were a short-lived hard rock band consisting of former members of Whitesnake and Little Caesar.

== Overview ==
Following David Coverdale's decision to place Whitesnake on indefinite hiatus in the early 1990s, former Whitesnake members Adrian Vandenberg, Rudy Sarzo, and Tommy Aldridge elected to form a new band together. Lead vocalist James Christian of House of Lords was recruited to round out the new band; Christian, however, was fired after a short time and replaced by former Little Caesar vocalist Ron Young. No material was recorded during the time Christian was in the band.

The band released one self-titled album on 24 March 1994.

== Former members ==
- Adrian Vandenberg - guitar, keyboards (1993–1994)
- Rudy Sarzo - bass (1993–1994)
- Tommy Aldridge - drums, percussion (1993–1994)
- James Christian - lead vocals (1993)
- Ron Young - lead vocals (1993–1994)

== The album ==
Manic Eden

Studio album by Manic Eden
- Released: 24 March 1994
- Genre: Hard rock
- Length: 53:10
- Label: Victor
- Producer: Tom Fletcher, Manic Eden

Manic Eden chronology
''Manic Eden''	...

Professional ratings
Review scores
Source	Rating
Allmusic	(Not Rated)

=== Reissue ===
Mascot Label Group announced that the album would be released worldwide on CD, vinyl, and streaming for the first time upcoming on 12 April 2024, celebrating the album's 30th anniversary release.

=== Track listing ===
1. "Can You Feel It" - 4:15
2. "When the Hammer Comes Down" - 5:45
3. "Ride the Storm" - 4:12
4. "Can't Hold It" - 4:00
5. "Fire in My Soul" - 6:15
6. "Do Angels Die" - 5:34
7. "Crossing the Line" - 4:20 (Bonus Japan Only Track)
8. "Dark Shade of Grey" - 4:40
9. "Pushing Me" - 4:30
10. "Gimme a Shot" - 5:10
11. "Keep It Coming" - 4:29

Personnel

- Ron Young - lead vocals
- Adrian Vandenberg - guitar, keyboards
- Rudy Sarzo - bass
- Tommy Aldridge - drums, percussion
- CeCe White - background vocals
- Sara Taylor - background vocals
- Chris Trujillo - percussion
- Guy Allison - keyboards
