= Wright Brothers Band =

Indiana-based music group

- Also known as: The Wright Brothers
- Origin: French Lick, Indiana, USA
- Genres: Country
- Years active: 1972–present
- Labels: Wright & Perry, Warner Bros., Mercury Nashville, Airborne
- Members: Tom Wright; Tim Wright; John McDowell
- Past members: Karl Hinkle; Steve Walker, drums

The Wright Brothers Band, formerly known as the Wright Brothers Overland Stage Company, formed in 1972, is an Indiana-based music group. They perform songs from the 1920s to the present day, and can cover bluegrass, pop standards, country, gospel, and even Aerosmith rock standards. The band briefly gained national attention with their patriotic song "Made in the U.S.A.", which celebrated companies that continued to manufacture their products in the United States. They performed on the Grand Ole Opry, The Today Show and appeared 12 times on Nashville Now. Signed with Warner Bros. and Mercury Records in the 1980s, the Wright Brothers had nine singles reach Billboard's Hot Country Singles chart. The band also recorded Shot Down in Hot Blood and a cover of "Jim Dandy" for the soundtrack of the 1987 Goldie Hawn movie Overboard, in which they also made a live appearance.

The band's first three albums, Cornfield Cowboys, Memorabilia Box, and Third Phonograph Album, were collected into a box set called Anthology, first on vinyl and then on CD. Memorabilia Box featured live medleys of Harry Nilsson's "The Rainmaker" with their own "Dawson", Mickey Newbury's "An American Trilogy" (Battle Hymn of the Republic/Dixie/All My Trials), and Neil Diamond's "Solaimon/Brother Love".

== Discography ==
=== Albums ===
Year	Album	US Country	Label
1984	Easy Street	55	Mercury

=== Singles ===
Year	Single	US Country	Album
12–12–1981	"Family Man"	35	singles only
1982	"When You Find Her, Keep Her"	42	singles only
1982	"Made in the U.S.A."	40	singles only
1983	"So Easy to Love"	68	singles only
05–26–1984	"Southern Women"	33	Easy Street
1984	"So Close"	46	Easy Street
1984	"Eight Days a Week"	57	Easy Street
05–18–1985	"Fire in the Sky"	48	singles only
1988	"Come On Rain"	85	singles only
