= Kulich (surname) =

Kulich is surname. Notable people with the surname include:

- Jiří Kulich (born 2004), Czech ice hockey player
- Michael Kulich (1986–2016), American pornographic film director
- Vladimir Kulich (born 1956), Czech-Canadian actor

== See also ==
- Kulič (surname)
- Kulić, surname
- Kulick, surname
