= High on the Hog (Black Oak Arkansas album) =

Studio album by Black Oak Arkansas
- Released: November 1973
- Recorded: September 15–19, 1972; August 4–29, 1973
- Studios: Criteria, Miami, Florida; Wally Heider, Hollywood, California
- Genres: Southern rock; country rock; classic rock
- Length: 33:50
- Label: Atco
- Producer: Tom Dowd

Black Oak Arkansas chronology
Raunch 'N' Roll Live (1973)	High on the Hog (1973)	Early Times (1974)

Professional ratings
Review scores
Source	Rating
Allmusic	4.5/5 stars

High on the Hog is the fourth studio album by American southern rock band Black Oak Arkansas, released in 1973 by Atco Records. It is known for its cover of the LaVern Baker song "Jim Dandy", which reached number 25 on the US Billboard Hot 100.

High on the Hog remains the group's most successful release.

== Critical reception ==
On AllMusic, Donald A. Guarisco wrote "["Jim Dandy"] is definitely High on the Hog's undisputed highlight, but the other tracks surrounding it also have plenty to offer. Although they were too eccentric a band to fit a strict "Southern rock" label à la Lynyrd Skynyrd, Black Oak Arkansas did have an ability to dish up both country and rock sounds with style.... [T]he group also shows a surprising ability to mix elements of pure funk into their country-rock stew..."

== Track listing ==
All songs by Black Oak Arkansas, except "Jim Dandy" by Lincoln Chase and "Moonshine Sonata" by Black Oak Arkansas & Tom Dowd.

1. "Swimmin' in Quicksand" – 3:20
2. "Back to the Land" – 2:25
3. "Movin'" – 3:13
4. "Happy Hooker" – 5:27
5. "Red Hot Lovin'" – 2:45
6. "Jim Dandy" – 2:38
7. "Moonshine Sonata" – 5:26
8. "Why Shouldn't I Smile" – 2:21
9. "High 'n' Dry" – 2:25
10. "Mad Man" – 3:50

== Personnel ==
Black Oak Arkansas

- Jim "Dandy" Mangrum – lead vocals
- Rickie Reynolds – guitars
- Harvey Jett – guitars
- Stanley Knight – guitars
- Pat Daugherty – bass guitar
- Tommy Aldridge – drums

Additional personnel

- Ruby Starr – backing vocals on "Jim Dandy"

Production

- Tom Dowd – producer
- Ron & Howie Albert – engineers on tracks 3, 9, 10
- Ed Barton – engineer on the other tracks
- Joe Petagno – album illustration

== Charts ==
Chart (1974)	Peak position
Canada Top Albums/CDs (RPM)	81
US Billboard 200	52

== Certifications ==
Region	Certification	Certified units/sales
United States (RIAA)	Gold	500,000^{^}
^{^} Shipments figures based on certification alone.
