= Vandenberg (band) =

Dutch–American hard rock band

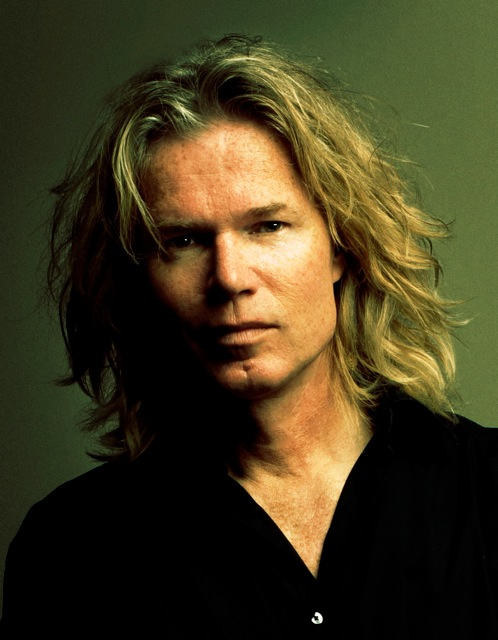
- Adriaan "Adje" van den Berg in 2012

Background information
- Origin: Amsterdam, the Netherlands
- Genres: Hard rock
- Years active: 1981–1987; 2020–present
- Label: Atco
- Members: Adrian Vandenberg; Mats Levén; Randy van der Elsen; Koen Herfst
- Past members: Bert Heerink; Dick Kemper; Jos Zoomer; Ronnie Romero
- Website: vandenbergband.com

Vandenberg (Dutch pronunciation: [vɑndə(m)ˈbɛr(ə)x]) is a Dutch hard rock band from Amsterdam, formed in 1981. The group is named after guitarist Adriaan "Adje" van den Berg (a.k.a. Adrian Vandenberg).

== Career ==
In 1981, Van den Berg hired Bert Heerink (vocals), Dick Kemper (bass), and Jos Zoomer (drums), and formed the group Vandenberg. They recorded a demo that came to the notice of journalist Kees Baars. He offered to manage the group and contracted them to Atlantic Records.

Their first album, Vandenberg, was recorded at former Led Zeppelin guitarist Jimmy Page's studio, Sol Studios, and in 1983, their first single, "Burning Heart", reached No. 39 on the U.S. Billboard Hot 100 record chart. Vandenberg toured the U.S. as the opening act for Ozzy Osbourne and Kiss, and then independently in Japan in 1984. "Different Worlds", from their second album, Heading for a Storm, also did fairly well, but did not equal the success of "Burning Heart".

The band's third album, Alibi, was recorded in the Netherlands and produced by Jaap Eggermont, former drummer of Golden Earring. The album failed to enter the charts and not long after, the lead singer, Heerink, left the band. Demos with a new vocalist, Peter Struyk, were not well received by Atlantic.

Around that time, Van den Berg (who often uses an Anglicized version of his Dutch name: Adrian Vandenberg) played as a guest soloist on a Whitesnake album and in 1987, Whitesnake vocalist David Coverdale asked him to join the band permanently. As he wasn't having much success with his own band, Vandenberg accepted the invitation.

In 2004, Vandenberg reunited and released a double CD, The Definitive Vandenberg, a compilation of their best songs, with a newly recorded version of "Burning Heart". In January 2005, the band released a DVD with footage of a 1984 Tokyo concert.

In July 2012, it was reported that Heerink, Kemper, and Zoomer were trying to take over the rights to the name "Van Den Berg" from the band's guitarist.

In January 2020, guitarist Adrian Vandenberg announced that the Vandenberg name would once again be used for an all-new lineup and new album, featuring former Rainbow vocalist Ronnie Romero on vocals, with guests Rudy Sarzo on bass and Brian Tichy on drums.

On 26 March 2020, the band announced the upcoming release of their first studio album in 35 years, simply titled 2020. The record came out on 29 May.

On 8 October 2021, Vandenberg announced that Swedish singer Mats Levén had joined the band. In August 2023, the group released the album Sin with a new lineup that included Vandenberg, Levén, Koen Herfst on drums, and Randy van der Elsen on bass. The record was produced by Bob Marlette

== Band members ==
Current

- Adrian Vandenberg – guitar, keyboards, synthesizers
- Mats Levén – vocals
- Randy van der Elsen – bass
- Koen Herfst – drums

Past

- Bert Heerink – vocals
- Dick Kemper – bass, synthesizers
- Jos Zoomer – drums
- Ronnie Romero – vocals

== Discography ==
Studio albums

List of studio albums, with selected chart positions
Year	Title	Peak chart positions	
Year	Title	NLD	US
1982	Vandenberg	19	65
1983	Heading for a Storm	14	169
1985	Alibi	18	—
2020	2020	2	—
2023	Sin	3	—

Compilations

- The Best of Vandenberg (1988)
- Different Worlds: The Definitive Vandenberg (2004)

Video albums

- Live in Japan (2005)
