= Vandenberg (album) =

1982 studio album by Vandenberg

Studio album by Vandenberg
- Released: 1982
- Recorded: April 1982
- Studios: Sol (Cookham, England)
- Genres: Hard rock, heavy metal
- Length: 34:22
- Label: ATCO
- Producers: Vandenberg, Stuart Epps

Vandenberg chronology
Vandenberg (1982)	Heading for a Storm (1983)

Singles from Vandenberg
- 1. "Burning Heart" / "Out in the Streets" Released: 1982; 2. "Wait" / "Ready for You" Released: 1982

Professional ratings
Review scores
Source	Rating
AllMusic	4/5 stars
Collector's Guide to Heavy Metal	10/10
Sounds	4/5 stars

Vandenberg is the debut studio album by the Dutch hard rock band Vandenberg, released in 1982 by Atco Records. The album was produced by Vandenberg with British sound engineer Stuart Epps and recorded at Jimmy Page's Sol Studios in England.

The power ballad "Burning Heart" was released internationally as the single from the album. “Burning Heart” peaked at number 39 on the Billboard 100. The album peaked at number 65 on the Billboard 200 album chart in 1983 and AllMusic called it "easily one of the most underrated debut metal albums of the '80s."

Vandenberg was remastered and re-released on Wounded Bird Records in 2002.

== Track listing ==
Music and lyrics by Adrian Vandenberg.

Side one

1. "Your Love Is in Vain" - 4:15
2. "Back on My Feet" - 3:55
3. "Wait" - 5:11
4. "Burning Heart" - 4:11

Side two

5. "Ready for You" - 3:57
6. "Too Late" - 4:12
7. "Nothing to Lose" - 3:23
8. "Lost in a City" - 3:58
9. "Out in the Streets" - 4:07

== Personnel ==
Vandenberg

- Bert Heerink – lead vocals
- Adrian Vandenberg – guitars, keyboards, backing vocals, cover design
- Dick Kemper – bass, Taurus pedals and background vocals
- Jos Zoomer – drums and background vocals

Production

- Stuart Epps – producer, engineer
- Mastering at The Townhouse, London

== Charts ==
Chart (1982)	Peak position
Dutch Albums (Album Top 100)	19
US Billboard 200	65
