= Adrian Vandenberg =

Dutch guitarist (born 1954)

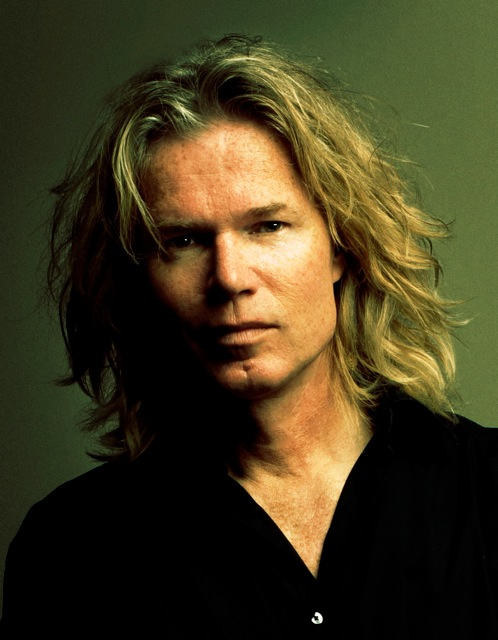
- Vandenberg in 2012

Background information
- Also known as: Adje, Ad
- Born: Adriaan van den Berg; 31 January 1954 (age 72); The Hague, Netherlands
- Genres: Hard rock, heavy metal, glam metal, blues rock
- Occupation: Guitarist
- Years active: 1978–present
- Formerly of: Teaser; Vandenberg; Whitesnake; Manic Eden
- Website: vandenberg-art.com

Adriaan van den Berg (born 31 January 1954), known as Adrian "Adje" Vandenberg, is a Dutch rock guitarist, best known for his tenure as one of the guitarists in Whitesnake during their successful late 1980s period and the band Vandenberg which he started in 1981. In 2013, Adrian formed a new band, Vandenberg's MoonKings, and recorded a new studio album which was released in early 2014.

== Early years ==
Born in The Hague in the Netherlands, Adrian van den Berg was originally the lead guitarist for the Dutch band Teaser, a band that released a self-titled album in 1978. He then started his own band, simply named Vandenberg, who released three albums in the 1980s, Vandenberg, Heading for a Storm and Alibi. They are arguably best known for the ballad "Burning Heart," a song that features complementing guitar layers and harmonies, and "Friday Night", from the Heading for a Storm album. They toured extensively, including a support slot to the Michael Schenker Group in the UK in late 1982, and Kiss in 1983.

== Career ==
=== Whitesnake ===
Adriaan van den Berg was originally approached to join Whitesnake in the early 1980s, having impressed David Coverdale with not only his guitar skills, but also with his songwriting talent and his ability as a band leader. He initially declined, due to the success of his own band Vandenberg and their Top 40 hit, "Burning Heart." By 1986, however, with pressure from the record company to become more and more commercial and their success hitting a plateau, he relented and finally disbanded Vandenberg, agreeing to join Coverdale in Whitesnake. Initially he was hired as a session musician, helping to complete their eponymous album Whitesnake (known as 1987 in Europe) after a mass-firing of the original band members by Coverdale. He contributed the solo to their No. 1 hit "Here I Go Again," but guitarist John Sykes played all of the other lead and rhythm guitar on the album.

After an extremely successful world tour and extensive airplay for their 3 videos on MTV, van den Berg co-wrote all of the music to the follow-up album Slip of the Tongue. Injury prevented him from recording for the album, so Coverdale enlisted Steve Vai to record both lead and rhythm guitar. Van den Berg was sufficiently healed to play with the band, in a dual-guitar role alongside Vai, for the tour supporting the album. After Whitesnake was disbanded in 1990, he returned as part of other Whitesnake incarnations such as the 1994 Whitesnake's Greatest Hits reunion/tour. He once again co-wrote the songs for the 1997 album Restless Heart with Coverdale. This time, he played all of the guitars on this stripped-down, bluesy album, turning away from his well-known rock/metal neo-classical chops and towards his original main influence, Jimi Hendrix. He also collaborated with Coverdale on the Whitesnake unplugged acoustic album, Starkers in Tokyo.

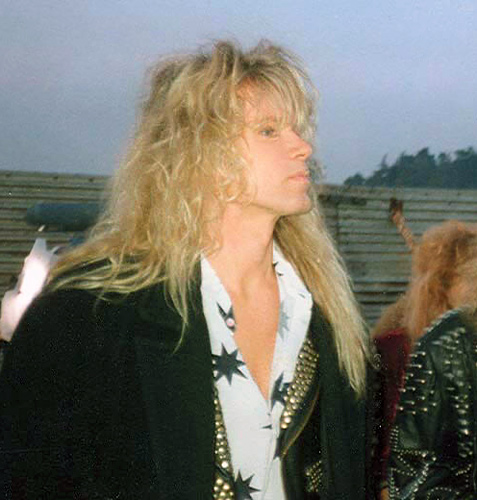
Vandenberg in 1990

After Whitesnake, he played in the band Manic Eden, which also featured former Little Caesar singer Ron Young, and Adrian's former Whitesnake bandmates bassist Rudy Sarzo and drummer Tommy Aldridge. The band split up when Adrian took part in Whitesnake's 1994 Greatest Hits reunion/tour.

He has since returned to painting and is an accomplished airbrush artist, having created the cover art for both the Heading for a Storm and Alibi albums.

When Whitesnake played in van den Berg's home country, the Netherlands, he made a "surprise guest appearance," doing so at the June 2008 Arrow Rock Festival in Nijmegen, where he joined the current line-up for a performance of "Here I Go Again". He also played with them on the Sweden Rock Festival in 2011 along with Bernie Marsden.

=== 2011–2013 ===
As of 2011, Adrian van den Berg has written and recorded a song called "A Number One" for Dutch football team FC Twente from his hometown in Enschede. Controversy would soon ensue, resulting from the fact that he released the single under the moniker "Vandenberg". Other (former) members of his eponymous band in the 1980s did not approve of Adrian using the name "Vandenberg" without his first name, which resulted in a lawsuit. In court, Adrian won, with the final decision declaring that he has all the rights to use the name "Vandenberg."

=== MoonKings ===
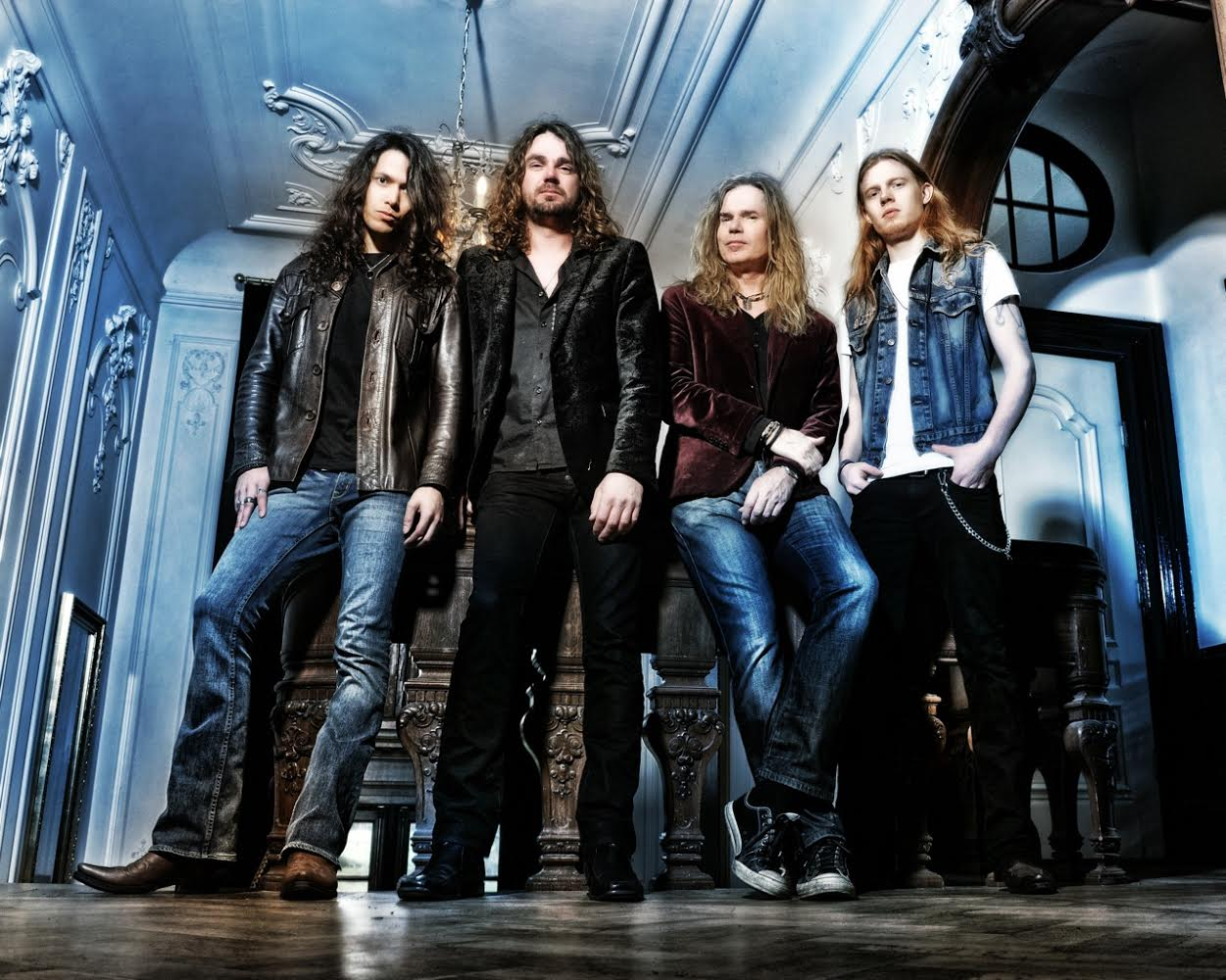
Vandenberg's MoonKings in 2014

Vandenberg formed Vandenberg's MoonKings in late 2013. The band consists of Vandenberg (guitar), Jan Hoving (vocals), Mart Nijen-Es (drums) and Sem Christoffel (bass). On 21 February 2014 Vandenberg's MoonKings released their debut album MoonKings on Mascot Records. On November 3, 2017, with the same group of musicians, "MoonKings MK II" was released. The album is a mixture of classic seventies style rock with current heavy style of rock.

== Discography ==
Date	Bands	Titles	Notes
1978	Teaser	Teaser	
1982	Vandenberg	Vandenberg	
1983	Vandenberg	Heading for a Storm	
1985	Vandenberg	Alibi	
1985	Vandenberg	Live In Japan	Videos
1987	Whitesnake	Whitesnake	Plays guitar solo on "Here I Go Again" but does not appear anywhere else on the album
1988	Vandenberg	The Best of Vandenberg	
1989	Whitesnake	Slip of the Tongue	co-writer; credited as guitarist, but does not play on the album
1994	Manic Eden	Manic Eden	
1997	Whitesnake	Restless Heart	
1997	Whitesnake	Starkers in Tokyo	live acoustic album
2004	Vandenberg	Different Worlds: The Definitive Vandenberg	compilation album
2011	Whitesnake	Live at Donington 1990	CD&DVD
2014	Vandenberg's MoonKings	Vandenberg's MoonKings	
2017	Whitesnake	"Snakeskin Boots" Live on Tour 1987/1988	Bonus disc on the 30th anniversary edition of Whitesnake's self-titled album
2017	Vandenberg's MoonKings	MK II	
2018	Vandenbergs's Moonkings	Rugged and Unplugged	Acoustic album
2020	Vandenberg	2020	
2023	Vandenberg	Sin	

Guest appearances

- 1990 – Steve Vai – Passion and Warfare (backing vocals)
- 2022 – Star One - Revel in Time (guitar solo on "Revel in Time")
- 2024 – Michael Schenker – My Years with UFO (guest guitarist in the song "Too Hot to Handle")
