= Kulick =

Kulick is surname. Notable people with the surname include:

- Barry Kulick, film producer
- Bob Kulick (born 1950–2020), American guitarist
- Bruce Kulick (born 1953), American guitarist
- Don Kulick (born 1960), American anthropologist
- Josh Kulick, American drummer
- Kelly Kulick (born 1977), American bowler

== See also ==
- Kulich (surname)
