= If an Angel Came to See You, Would You Make Her Feel at Home? =

Album by Black Oak Arkansas

Studio album by Black Oak Arkansas
- Released: June 1972
- Studios: Criteria Studios, Miami, Florida
- Genres: Southern rock; country rock; hard rock; boogie rock
- Length: 36:03
- Label: Atco
- Producer: Tom Dowd

Black Oak Arkansas chronology
Keep the Faith (1972)	If an Angel Came to See You, Would You Make Her; Feel at Home? (1972)	Raunch 'N' Roll Live (1973)

Professional ratings
Review scores
Source	Rating
Allmusic	3/5 stars

If an Angel Came to See You, Would You Make Her Feel at Home? is the third studio album released by southern rock band Black Oak Arkansas in 1972. It is the recording debut of drummer Tommy Aldridge.

== Track listing ==
All selections written by Black Oak Arkansas.

1. "Gravel Roads" – 3:11
2. "Fertile Woman" – 5:18
3. "Spring Vacation" – 3:01
4. "We Help Each Other" – 3:12
5. "Full Moon Ride" – 3:46
6. "Our Minds Eye" – 4:13
7. "To Make Us What We Are" – 4:53
8. "Our Eyes Ere on You" – 3:45
9. "Mutants of the Monster" – 4:44

== Personnel ==
Black Oak Arkansas

- Jim "Dandy" Mangrum - lead vocals, washboard
- Rickie "Ricochet" Reynolds - 12-string rhythm guitar, vocals
- Harvey "Burley" Jett - lead guitar, banjo, piano, vocals
- Stanley "Goober" Knight - lead and steel guitar, organ, vocals
- Pat "Dirty" Daugherty - bass guitar, vocals
- Tommy "T.A." Aldridge - drums

== Production ==
- Doc Siegel - executive producer
- Howie Albert and Ron Albert, Chuck Kirkpatrick - engineers
- Tom Dowd, Doc Siegel - remixing
- Les Weisbrich - art direction, illustration, graphics
- Jack Kern - photography

== Charts ==
Chart (1972)	Peak position
US Billboard 200	93
