= Heading for a Storm =

Studio album by Vandenberg
- Released: 4 November 1983
- Recorded: 1983
- Studios: Sol Studios, Cookham, England
- Genres: Hard rock, heavy metal
- Length: 36:25
- Label: ATCO
- Producers: Stuart Epps & Adrian Vandenberg

Vandenberg chronology
Vandenberg (1982)	Heading for a Storm (1983)	Alibi (1985)

Singles from Heading for a Storm
- 1. "Friday Night" / "This is War" Released: 1983; 2. "Different Worlds" / "Too Late (Live)" Released: 1983; 3. "Waiting for the Night" Released: December 21, 1983

Professional ratings
Review scores
Source	Rating
AllMusic	3/5 stars
Collector's Guide to Heavy Metal	10/10
Melodic	3.5/5 stars

Heading for a Storm is the second studio album by the Dutch hard rock band Vandenberg, released in 1983 on Atco Records.

== Cover art ==
This cover art has a highway in a desolate desert and large sharks flying on the road. The painting on the album cover was made by guitarist Adrian Vandenberg.

== Commercial performance ==
In the Netherlands, the preceding single "Different Worlds" ranked 17th on the singles chart, and the album entered the top 50 in the eighth week of the album chart and ranked 14th for two weeks. In addition, it spent six weeks the on Japan's Oricon Top 100 LP chart rising to 71.

On the other hand, in the U.S., it was not as successful as its previous work, charting at #169 on the Billboard 200, with the single "Friday Night" charting at 29 on the Billboard Mainstream Rock chart.

== Track listing ==
Music and lyrics by Adrian Vandenberg

Side one

1. "Friday Night" - 3:37
2. "Welcome to the Club" - 3:30
3. "Time Will Tell" - 3:48
4. "Different Worlds" - 4:36

Side two

5. "This Is War" - 4:01
6. "I'm on Fire" - 4:18
7. "Heading for a Storm" - 4:03
8. "Rock On" - 4:05
9. "Waiting for the Night" - 4:27

== Personnel ==
=== Band members ===
- Bert Heerink – lead vocals, backing vocals
- Adrian Vandenberg – guitars, keyboards, backing vocals, producer, mixing, cover design
- Dick Kemper – bass guitar, bass pedals, backing vocals
- Jos Zoomer – drums, backing vocals

=== Production ===
- Stuart Epps - producer, engineer
- Bob Ludwig - mastering at Masterdisk, New York

== Charts ==
Chart (1983)	Peak position
Dutch Albums (Album Top 100)	14
US Billboard 200	169
