= Alibi (Vandenberg album) =

Studio album by Vandenberg
- Released: 29 August 1985
- Recorded: 1985
- Studios: Soundpush, Blaricum, Netherlands
- Genres: Hard rock, heavy metal
- Length: 36:45
- Label: ATCO
- Producer: Jaap Eggermont

Vandenberg chronology
Heading for a Storm (1983)	Alibi (1985)	The Best of Vandenberg (1988)

Singles from Alibi
- 1. "Once in a Lifetime" Released: 1985; 2. "How Long" / "Dressed To Kill" Released: 1985

Professional ratings
Review scores
Source	Rating
AllMusic	3/5 stars
Collector's Guide to Heavy Metal	9/10

Alibi is the third studio album by Dutch hard rock band Vandenberg, released on 29 August 1985 by Atco Records. This was Vandenberg's final studio album for 35 years until their next release with new members in 2020.

== Background ==
It was recorded in the Netherlands; a first for a Vandenberg album. Following the previous album, Adrian Vandenberg painted cover art, and in 2007, 75 artwork graphs were released in commemoration of Adrian's individual painting exhibition, Stuck Between Rock and an Art Place, in Antwerp.

Bert Heerink has since emphasized vocals in Alibi regarding the production of the record: "The two early albums say that for me, the production of the opening of the song seems to be emphasized."

== Cover art ==
The cover art featured Mexican Maya civilization and crocodiles from the ground in the red sunset. Like its predecessor, its artwork was created by guitarist Adrian Vandenberg himself.

== Track listing ==
Music and lyrics by Adrian Vandenberg

Side one

1. "All the Way" – 3:50
2. "Pedal to the Metal" – 4:31
3. "Once in a Lifetime" – 3:54
4. "Voodoo" – 3:21
5. "Dressed to Kill" – 3:36

Side two

6. "Fighting Against the World" – 4:17
7. "How Long" – 4:12
8. "Prelude Mortale" – 0:38
9. "Alibi" – 4:23
10. "Kamikaze" – 5:03

== Personnel ==
=== Band members ===
- Bert Heerink – lead vocals, harmony vocals
- Adrian Vandenberg – guitars, synthesizers, harmony vocals, cover painting
- Dick Kemper – bass guitar, bass pedals, harmony vocals
- Jos Zoomer – drums, percussion

=== Additional musicians ===
- Peter Schön – keyboards
- Piet Souer, Omar Dupree – background vocals

=== Production ===
- Jaap Eggermont – producer, engineer, remix on "Once in a Lifetime"
- John Smit – engineer
- Stephen Benben – remix on "Once in a Lifetime"
- Dan Nash – remix assistant on "Once in a Lifetime"
- Bob Ludwig – mastering at Masterdisk, New York

== Charts ==
Chart (1985)	Peak position
Dutch Albums (Album Top 100)	18
