= Josh Kulick =

American heavy metal drummer

Josh Kulick is an American heavy metal drummer who was the drummer of Through the Eyes of the Dead and Given With Honor. Kulick is from Topeka, Kansas.
