= Black Oak Arkansas (album) =

Studio album by Black Oak Arkansas
- Released: March 1971
- Studio: Paramount, Hollywood; Gold Star, Hollywood
- Genre: Southern rock; country rock
- Length: 32:10
- Label: Atco
- Producer: Lee Dorman, Mike Pinera

Black Oak Arkansas chronology
Black Oak Arkansas (1971)	Keep the Faith (1972)

Professional ratings
Review scores
Source	Rating
AllMusic	3.5/5 stars
The Rolling Stone Record Guide	1/5 stars

Black Oak Arkansas is the debut studio album by American Southern rock band Black Oak Arkansas, released in 1971.

== Track listing ==
All selections written and arranged by Black Oak Arkansas, except where noted.

1. "Uncle Lijiah" - 3:17
2. "Memories at the Window" - 3:05
3. "The Hills of Arkansas" - 3:45
4. "I Could Love You" - 6:10
5. "Hot and Nasty" (Daugherty, Jett, Knight, Reynolds, Smith, Stone) - 2:55
6. "Singing the Blues" (Melvin Endsley) - 2:17
7. "Lord Have Mercy on My Soul" - 6:15
8. "When Electricity Came to Arkansas" - 4:26

== Personnel ==
=== Black Oak Arkansas ===
- Jim "Dandy" Mangrum - lead vocals, washboard
- Rickie "Ricochet" Reynolds - 12-string rhythm guitar, vocals
- Harvey "Burley" Jett - lead guitar, banjo, piano, vocals
- Stanley "Goober" Knight - lead and steel guitar, organ, vocals
- Pat "Dirty" Daugherty - bass guitar, vocals
- Wayne "Squeezebox" Evans - drums

== Production ==
- Sheldon Krechman, Lee D. Weisel - executive production
- Brian Bruderlin, Stan Ross - engineer
- Jay Senter, Doc Siegel - remixing
- Eve Babitz - cover design, photography

== Charts ==
Chart (1971)	Peak position
US Billboard 200	127

== Certifications ==
Region	Certification	Certified units/sales
United States (RIAA)	Gold	500,000^{^}
^{^} Shipments figures based on certification alone.
