= Jam Factory (band) =

- Years active: 1970–1972

Jam Factory was an American rock group from Syracuse, New York, active between 1970 and 1972. The six-man band was founded by Howie Wyeth of Syracuse University and featured Steve Marcone and Earl Ford on brass, Mark Hoffmann on guitar, Kent DeFelice on bass, Joe English on drums, and Gene McCormick on keyboards. The band played the Schaefer Music Festival in 1970. After leaving Jam Factory, Joe English went on to be the drummer for Paul McCartney and Wings. Gene McCormick died on December 12, 2022, at the age of 73.

== Discography ==
=== Albums ===
- Sittin' In The Trap (1970) Epic Records

=== Singles ===
- "Talk Is Cheap" / "Together" (1971) Epic Records
