= Street Party (Black Oak Arkansas album) =

Studio album by Black Oak Arkansas
- Released: 1974
- Genres: Rock, country rock, boogie rock
- Label: Atco
- Producer: Tom Dowd

Black Oak Arkansas chronology
Early Times (1974)	Street Party (1974)	Ain't Life Grand (1975)

Street Party is the sixth album by the American band Black Oak Arkansas, released in 1974. They supported it by opening for Black Sabbath on a European tour; the bandmembers were able to leave the country following the end of their probation for stealing PA equipment. The album peaked at No. 56 on the Billboard 200. It was rereleased in 2013.

== Production ==
Recorded in 14 days, the album was produced by Tom Dowd. It was the band's last album to which founding guitarist Harvey Jett contributed. Black Oak Arkansas's rock take on "Dixie" is preceded by a shorter, traditional version. They used a banjo on "Everybody Wants to See Heaven, 'Nobody Wants to Die'".

== Critical reception ==
Professional ratings
Review scores
Source	Rating
AllMusic	2.5/5 stars
The Encyclopedia of Popular Music	2/5 stars
Southern Rock Review	6/10

The News and Observer noted "the mountain rock 'n' roll, grinding rhythms, stomping beats, and energized gravelly vocals." The Chicago Tribune said, "Not much food for thought here, but you will receive a heavy call for action delivered in 12 very short tunes designed to be played at full volume." The Detroit Free Press praised the "nice, tuneful rock melodies". The Los Angeles Times called the album "coarse country-rock music" and concluded that "none of the original material is particularly catchy or noteworthy." The Flint Journal labeled it "heavy boogie music".

Geoffrey Stokes, in the 1974 Village Voice Pazz & Jop poll, listed Street Party as the tenth best album of the year. AllMusic concluded, "Too much emphasis is placed on style and musical devices, while the amount of straight-ahead Southern rock is unduly restricted."

== Track listing ==
North side

1. "Dancing in the Streets"
2. "Sting Me"
3. "Good Good Woman"
4. "Jail Bait"
5. "Sure Been Workin' Hard"
6. "Son of a Gun"

South side

1. "Brink of Creation"
2. "I'm a Man"
3. "Goin' Home"
4. "Dixie"
5. "Everybody Wants to See Heaven, 'Nobody Wants to Die'"
6. "Hey Ya'll"
7. "Brink of Creation"
