= Ruby Starr =

American singer (1949–1995)

- Born: Constance Henrietta Mierzwiak; November 30, 1949; Toledo, Ohio
- Died: January 14, 1995 (aged 45) Toledo, Ohio
- Genres: Blue-eyed soul; pop rock; boogie rock; Southern rock

Ruby Starr (born Constance Henrietta Mierzwiak November 30, 1949 – January 14, 1995), was an American rock singer and recording artist who attained national prominence in the 1970s and 1980s, notably for her work with the Southern rock band Black Oak Arkansas.

== Childhood and early career ==
Constance was born in Toledo, Ohio, to parents Richard Joseph "Dick" Mierzwiak and Henrietta. Her siblings were Richard Jr., and Suzanne Bonita. Known as "Connie" to her family, Starr began to perform professionally by the age of nine, singing country music.

== Recording artist ==
She made her first record at the age of 10 under the stage name Connie Little. Her first band was Connie and the Blu-Beats. She left school at 16 to join the Downtowners. She then joined the Blue Grange Ramblers.

She joined the band 'Ruby Jones' in 1969. In 1971 they were signed to Curtom Records and recorded their first album, Ruby Jones. Shortly after that album's release, Black Oak Arkansas lead vocalist Jim "Dandy" Mangrum was partying after a concert in Evansville, Indiana, at a club called the Golden Record, where she was performing. He asked her on the spot to join the band. At this point she assumed the stage name of "Ruby Starr".

Starr toured with Black Oak Arkansas for several years at the height of their success. She was featured in their 1973 Top 30 single "Jim Dandy (To The Rescue)". In 1974, she began touring on her own again as 'Ruby Starr & Grey Ghost' (members: Gary Levin, Marius Penczner, David Mayo, and Joel Williams) and released an eponymous album in 1975, on Capitol Records. Her second album, Scene Stealer, also on Capitol Records, was released in 1976. During this time she continued to open for Black Oak Arkansas and other acts such as Black Sabbath and Edgar Winter Group. Starr also toured with Blackfoot from 1977 to 1978. Her third and last album for Capitol, Smoky Places, was released in 1977.

By the late 1970s, Starr had made Milwaukee, Wisconsin her home town and was a popular act in clubs in the region. By the early 1980s, Starr had formed a new band called 'Grey-Star' by joining with a band that performed in and around Mayville, Wisconsin called 'Lucy Grey', featuring Dave "Mud Slide" Gruenewaldt on drums. They issued several recordings which included 1981's Grey-Star and 1983's Telephone Sex. Starr formed her final road band, 'Henrietta Kahn', in the late 1980s.

British band Sons of Liberty recorded a track on their Aces and Eights album appropriately called "Ruby Starr".

In 2024 Ruby Starr's entire music catalog was reissued by American label Cabal Records USA, issued under a legal assignment for publishing rights after the death of Rickie Lee “Riccochet” Reynolds. Toenges LLC partnered with Reynolds to obtain rights from her manager Butch Stone. Timexx Seabaugh is the producer in charge who has also worked for Black Oak Arkansas. Timexx and Becca Williams handled the remastered editions of Ruby's music.

== Las Vegas period ==
In the early 1990s, Starr quit the road and moved to Las Vegas, playing at casino/hotels on the Strip such as the Riviera and the Stardust as well as local clubs. She was about to join the Country Legends show at the Aladdin when she was diagnosed with cancer.

== Death ==
After being diagnosed with lung cancer and a brain tumor, Starr returned home to her family in Toledo, where she died at age 45.

== Discography ==
=== Albums ===
- Ruby Jones (by the group 'Ruby Jones') (Curtom 1971)
- Ruby Starr & Grey Ghost (Capitol 1975; Cabal Records, 2023 Remaster)
- Scene Stealer (Capitol 1976; Cabal Records, 2023 Remaster)
- Smokey Places (Capitol 1977; Cabal Records, 2023 Remaster)
- Grey-Star (by Grey-Star featuring Ruby Starr) (Emotion Records, 1981)
- Toledo's Best Rock (Pacer Records, 1981) various artists compilation album by WIOT-FM "FM 104" from Toledo OH; featuring one track, "Hear It On The Radio" by Ruby Jones
- Telephone Sex (by Grey-Star featuring Ruby Starr) (Emotion Records, 1983)
- Stone Junkie (Sequel, 2000) (reissue of the Ruby Jones album)
- The Lost Tapes (The Legacy Edition) (Cabal Records, 2022)
- The Lost Tapes (The Bonus Tracks) [LP only release] (Cabal Records, 2022)
- The Early Years 1961-1969 (Cabal Records, 2023) (as Connie Little; reissue of all her 45 rpm singles)
- Ruby Starr: The Curtom Sessions 1971 (Cabal Records, 2023) (another reissue of the Ruby Jones album)
- Alive In '75 (Live From Winterland) (Cabal Records, 2023)
- Live From Long Beach (The Mike Millard Recordings) (Cabal Records, 2023)
- Absolutely Ruby (The Valentine EP) (Cabal Records, 2023)
- Stealin' The Show (Rare Live and Demo Recordings 1980-1991) (Cabal Records, 2023)
- Screen Grab (Rare Live and Demo Recordings 1980-1991) (Cabal Records, 2024)
- The Cabal Collection, vol. 1 (Cabal Records, 2023)
- A Very Cabal Christmas, vol. 1 (Cabal Records, 2023)
- The Cabal Collection, vol. 2: The Heavy Early Years (Cabal Records, 2024)

=== With Black Oak Arkansas ===
- High on the Hog (Atco, 1973)
- Street Party (Atco, 1974)
- Balls of Fire (MCA, 1976)
- 10 Yr Overnight Success (MCA, 1976)
- King Biscuit Flower Hour Presents: Black Oak Arkansas (King Biscuit Flower Hour/BMG, 1998) recorded 1976
- Hot and Nasty (The Best of Black Oak Arkansas) (Atlantic/WEA [UK], 1974) – note: single LP with 12 tracks
- The Best of Black Oak Arkansas (Atco, 1977)
- Hot & Nasty: The Best of Black Oak Arkansas (Rhino Records, 1992)
- 'Hot And Nasty' And Other Hits (Flashback/Rhino, 1997)
- The Definitive Rock Collection (Atlantic/Rhino, 2006) 2-CD set
