= Keep the Faith (Black Oak Arkansas album) =

Studio album by Black Oak Arkansas
- Released: January 1972
- Studios: Village Recorder, Los Angeles; Criteria, Miami
- Genres: Southern rock; country rock; hard rock; boogie rock
- Length: 37:24
- Label: Atco
- Producer: Black Oak Arkansas

Black Oak Arkansas chronology
Black Oak Arkansas (1971)	Keep the Faith (1972)	If an Angel Came to See You, Would You Make Her Feel at Home? (1972)

Professional ratings
Review scores
Source	Rating
Allmusic	2/5 stars
Christgau's Record Guide	C−

Keep the Faith is the second album by Black Oak Arkansas released in 1972. The original LP pressings have "gimmick" top-loading cover with 2 fold-out flaps on front that reveals a different photo along with lyrics and credits when opened up.

== Track listing ==
All selections written by Black Oak Arkansas.

1. "Keep the Faith" - 3:12
2. "Revolutionary All American Boys" - 3:35
3. "Feet on Earth, Head in Sky" - 4:10
4. "Fever in My Mind" - 2:52
5. "The Big One's Still Coming" - 3:57
6. "White Headed Woman" - 4:52
7. "We Live on Day to Day" - 5:16
8. "Short Life Line" - 4:52
9. "Don't Confuse What You Don't Know" - 4:38

== Personnel ==
Black Oak Arkansas

- Jim "Dandy" Mangrum - lead vocals, washboard
- Rickie "Ricochet" Reynolds - 12-string rhythm guitar, vocals
- Harvey "Burley" Jett - lead guitar, banjo, piano, vocals
- Stanley "Goober" Knight - lead and steel guitar, organ, vocals
- Pat "Dirty" Daugherty - bass guitar, vocals
- Wayne "Squeezebox" Evans - drums

with:

- The Family - backing vocals on "Keep the Faith"

== Production ==
- Doc Siegel - technical production
- Tom Dowd - remix engineer
- Les Weisbrich - art direction, photography

== Charts ==
Chart (1972)	Peak position
US Billboard 200	103
