= Jim Dandy =

Popular R&B song

Single by LaVern Baker

from the album LaVern Baker
- B-side: "Tra La La"
- Released: 1956
- Recorded: December 1955
- Genre: Rhythm and blues
- Length: 2:26
- Label: Atlantic
- Songwriter: Lincoln Chase

LaVern Baker singles chronology
"I Can't Love You Enough" (1956)	"Jim Dandy" (1956)	"Tra La La" (1956)

"Jim Dandy" (sometimes known as "Jim Dandy to the Rescue") is a song written by Lincoln Chase, and was first recorded by American R&B singer LaVern Baker on December 21, 1955. It reached the top of the R&B chart and #17 on the pop charts in the United States. It was named one of The Rock and Roll Hall of Fame's 500 Songs that Shaped Rock and Roll and was ranked #352 on Rolling Stone's 500 Greatest Songs of All Time.

The tenor saxophone solo is by Sam "The Man" Taylor. The drummer on the session was veteran Panama Francis. The backing vocals are provided by Atlantic's in-house backing group at the time, the Cues (credited as the Gliders), consisting of first tenor Abel DeCosta, second tenor Ollie Jones (formerly of the Ravens), bass Edward Barnes, and baritone Winfield Scott.

== Background ==
The song is about a man (Jim Dandy) who rescues women from improbable or impossible predicaments. It proved popular enough that Chase wrote a second song for Baker entitled "Jim Dandy Got Married."

The American English term jim-dandy for an outstanding person or thing predates the song; first attested in 1844, it may itself come from the title of an old song, "Dandy Jim of Caroline".

In early and mid 20th century black culture Jim Dandy was a term for the lover of a married woman, compare it with the "Sixty minute man". A much used theme in 1940s and 1950s R&B recordings.

== Black Oak Arkansas recording ==
"Jim Dandy"

Single by Black Oak Arkansas

from the album High on the Hog
- B-side: "Red Hot Lovin'"
- Released: 1973
- Recorded: 1973
- Genre: Southern rock
- Length: 2:38
- Label: Atco Records
- Songwriter: Lincoln Chase

Black Oak Arkansas singles chronology
"Hot and Nasty" (1973)	"Jim Dandy" (1973)	"Hey Y'all" (1974)

In 1973 the song was recorded by southern rock band Black Oak Arkansas. It reached No. 25 on the pop chart and featured Jim Mangrum (who had already been using "Jim Dandy" as a stage name before they covered the song) and female vocalist Ruby Starr trading off vocals. It was the first single from their 1973 album High on the Hog, the band's most commercially successful album. In Canada, the song reached No. 13, and was No. 131 in the year-end top 200.

== Other recorded versions ==
- Ann-Margret recorded a version on her 1962 album The Vivacious One.
- The song is the B-side to James Reyne's 1989 single, "One More River".

== Popular culture ==
- The song was featured in the 1972 John Waters film Pink Flamingos.
- The Black Oak Arkansas recording of the song was used in the 1993 film Dazed and Confused.
- A version by the Wright Brothers Band was used in the 1987 film Overboard.
- In the early-to-mid 2000s, a used car lot called J. D. Byrider produced a version replacing "Jim Dandy" with "JD" to advertise that they would "rescue" buyers with bad credit.
- Also featured in the 1987 movie "The Big Town" starring Matt Dillon
- LaVern Baker's version is used near the start of "Macon County Line" (1974), when the boys must escape out a window to the street.
