= Skweez Media =

American on-demand Internet television network

- Logo of Skweez Media
- Industry: Streaming
- Founded: 2014
- Number of locations: Santa Monica, California, U.S.
- Area served: Worldwide
- Key people: Jamey Kirby (President); Michael Kulich (Executive Vice President of Content and Marketing); Scott Borden (Executive Vice President of Business Development)
- Website: skweezme.com

Skweez Media is an American-based on-demand Internet television network available worldwide that offers a large selection of new and classic pornography. The company was established in 2014 and is headquartered in Santa Monica, California.

== History ==
Launched on January 20, 2014, CNBC dubbed Skweez Media's platform "the iTunes of porn" for its delivery method. It has also been likened to Netflix, and credited as a potential solution for an industry suffering from lagging DVD sales. Unlike most pornography sites, which use a subscription business model, Skweez Media offers access to its entire library for a non-recurring flat rate. Skweez Media describes its network as a portal for "clean porn": licensed pornography from major studios that avoids adware, malware, annoying animated advertisements, recurring fees, and the collection of credit card details. Skweez Media will offer original content (such as found on Hulu), including a 13-episode series.
