= Hot & Nasty: The Best of Black Oak Arkansas =

Compilation album by Black Oak Arkansas
- Released: November 3, 1992
- Genre: Southern rock
- Label: Rhino

Professional ratings
Review scores
Source	Rating
Allmusic	link

Hot & Nasty: The Best of Black Oak Arkansas is a compilation album by the American Southern rock band Black Oak Arkansas. Released on 10 November 1992 by Rhino, it is the second Black Oak Arkansas compilation album produced.

== Track listing ==
No.	Title	Length
1.	"Mean Woman (If You Ever Blues) (from "Early Times")"	2:51
2.	"Uncle Lijah (from "Black Oak Arkansas")"	3:20
3.	"Hot and Nasty (from "Black Oak Arkansas")"	2:57
4.	"Lord Have Mercy on My Soul (from "Black Oak Arkansas")"	6:13
5.	"When Electricity Came to Arkansas (from "Black Oak Arkansas")"	5:41
6.	"Keep the Faith (from "Keep The Faith")"	3:13
7.	"Fever in My Mind (from "Keep The Faith")"	2:53
8.	"Hot Rod"	3:24
9.	"Gravel Roads (from "If An Angel Came To See You, Would You Make Her Feel At Home?")"	3:12
10.	"Mutants of the Monster (from "If An Angel Came To See You, Would You Make Her Feel At Home?")"	6:08
11.	"Jim Dandy (from "High On The Hog")"	2:41
12.	"Happy Hooker (from "High On The Hog")"	5:32
13.	"Son of a Gun (from "Street Party")"	4:33
14.	"Dixie (from "Street Party")"	3:40
15.	"Everybody Wants to See Heaven "Nobody Wants to Die" (from "Street Party")"	3:07
16.	"Diggin' for Gold (from "Ain't Life Grand")"	3:36
17.	"Taxman (from "Ain't Life Grand")"	4:30
18.	"So You Want to Be a Rock 'n' Roll Star"	2:34
