= Little Caesar (band) =

American hard rock band

- Origin: Los Angeles, California, United States
- Genres: Hard rock, glam metal
- Years active: 1987–1992, 2001–present
- Labels: Geffen, DGC
- Members: Ron Young; Loren Molinare; Tom Morris; Pharoah Barrett; Mark Tremalgia
- Past members: Apache; Earl Slick; Marc Danzeisen; Joey Brasler; Joey Malone; Alex Kane; Fidel Paniagua
- Website: https://www.littlecaesar.net/

Little Caesar is an American hard rock band. They are remembered for their version of the Aretha Franklin song "Chain of Fools", a 1990 hit single from their self-titled debut album.

== History ==
The band was founded late in the 1980s by vocalist Ron Young, who had previously worked as a nightclub bouncer. The group independently released an EP and were featured on the 1989 Metal Blade compilation Street Survivors with one song "Down to the Wire", which led to their signing with DGC Records, a subsidiary of Geffen Records, in 1989. John Kalodner did A&R work for the group, and Bob Rock produced their debut self-titled album, which was released in 1990 to positive reviews. Eduardo Rivadavia of AllMusic retrospectively gave the album three stars out of five, writing it "may not be the most innovative recording of 1989, but it's honest and consistently satisfying." On the strength of the singles "Chain of Fools" (a cover of the Aretha Franklin song) and "In Your Arms", Little Caesar hit number 139 on the US Billboard 200 in 1990. Lead vocalist Ron Young made a brief cameo in James Cameron's Terminator 2, as the biker thrown through the window of the bar by Arnold Schwarzenegger.

Despite the group's chart success, they had problems with exposure on then-critical MTV, due in part to the band being less than photogenic and "looking like a gang of Hell's Angels." They remained with DGC/Geffen for a sophomore release, Influence in 1992, but neither Rock nor Kalodner continued working with them. By this time, guitarist Apache had left and was replaced with Earl Slick. After Influence failed to match the success of their debut, the group disbanded. They were one of many metal bands whose careers faltered with the early 1990s rise of alternative rock. DGC - initially a label strongly devoted to metal/progressive rock label - began to favor alternative bands. Ron Young later went on to sing in The Four Horsemen, Manic Eden, and Dirt.

The band reformed for some live shows in 2001, and released a new album, Redemption, in 2009. They also introduced new guitar player Joey Brasler (who had played with Etta James, Bob Welch, Cherie Currie) replacing original member Apache. After touring in the US, Europe and the UK during 2010/2011, Little Caesar released their fourth album entitled American Dream on the Unison Music Group label in May, 2012. It was produced by Bruce Witkin. They embarked on a tour of Spain, Germany, Switzerland, Belgium and culminating in Wales in December 2012.

On 25 March 2013, it was announced that band would perform at the Download Festival on the 16 June 2013. Frontman Ron Young explained: “20 years ago we were offered to play the festival when it was called Monsters Of Rock. We had to turn it down because our label would not give us the funds to get there. Today, with no label, manager or big-money supporters, we finally made it. We got there because we have some amazing people that prop us up, inspire us, and bless us with their talent, energies – and most priceless, their friendship. They’ve helped us accomplish what we couldn’t do with a lot of powerful people behind us.”

== Band members ==
Current members

- Ron Young – vocals (1987–1992, 2001–present)
- Tom Morris – drums (1987–1992, 2001–present)
- Loren Molinare – guitar (1987–1992, 2001–present)
- Mark Tremalgia – guitar (2017–present)
- Pharoah Barrett – bass (2015–present)

Former members

- Jimmy Hayne (Apache) – guitar (1987–1991, 2008)
- Earl Slick – guitar (1991–1992)
- Marc Danzeisen – drums (1992 touring only)
- Joey Brasler – guitar (2009–2013)
- Joey Malone – guitar (2014–2015)
- Alex Kane – guitar (2015–2017)
- Fidel Paniagua – bass (1987–1992, 2001–2015)

== Discography ==
=== Studio albums ===
- Little Caesar (1990)
- Influence (1992)
- This Time It's Different (1998)
- Redemption (2009 + 2010 Reissue + 2021 Deluxe Edition)
- American Dream (2012 + 2022 Deluxe Edition)
- Eight (2018)

=== Live albums ===
- Brutally Honest Live from Holland (2015)

=== Extended plays ===
- Name Your Poison (1989)

=== Singles ===
Title	Release	Peak chart positions		Album
Title	Release	US	US Main	Album
"Chain of Fools"	1990	88	17	Little Caesar
"From the Start"	1990	—	—	Little Caesar
"In Your Arms"	1991	79	35	Little Caesar
"Slow Ride"	1992	—	—	Influence
"Stand Up"	1992	—	—	Influence

=== Soundtrack appearances ===
Title	Release	Soundtrack
"Down to the Wire"	1991	Point Break
