= Black Oak Arkansas =

American southern rock group

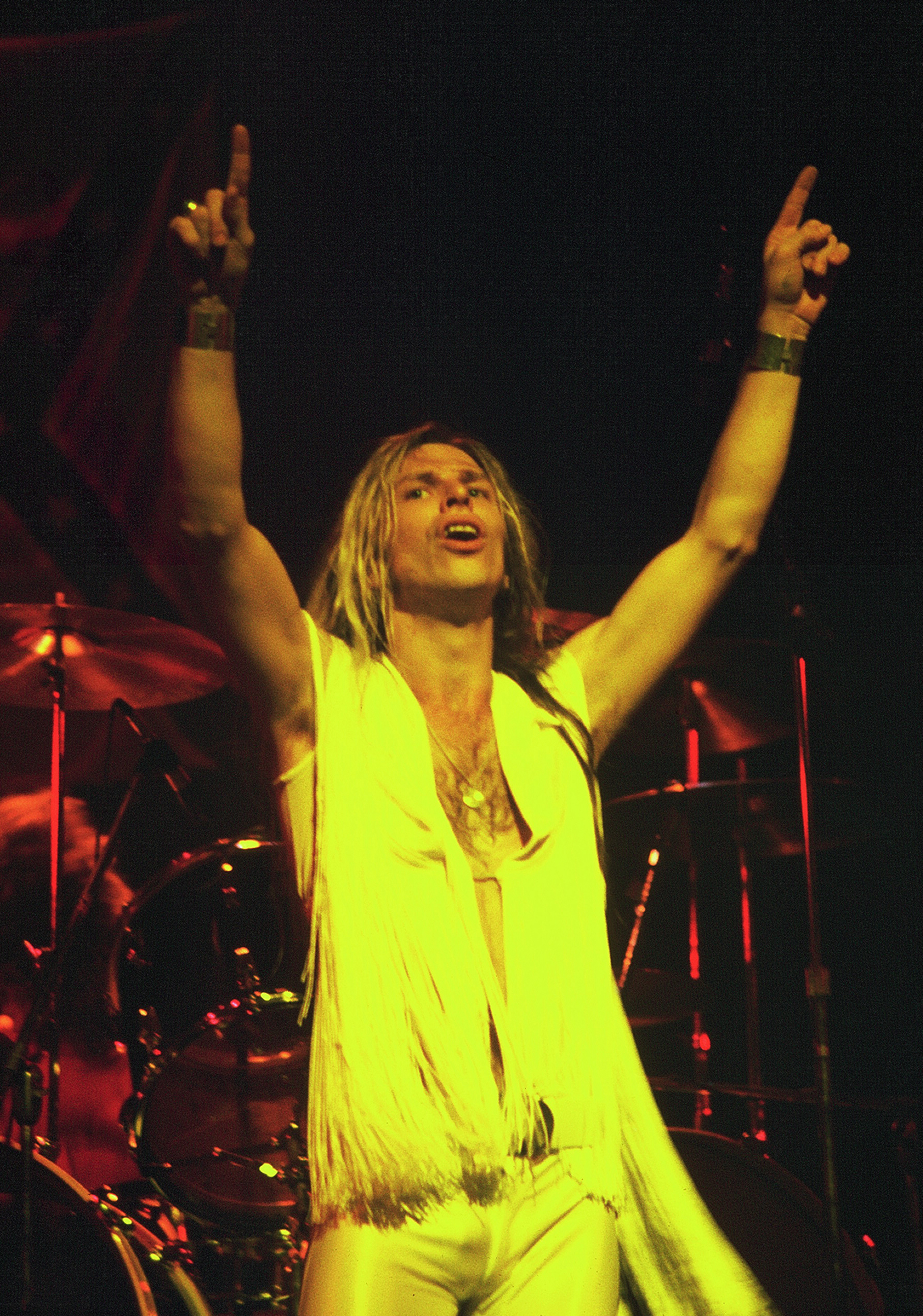
- Jim "Dandy" Mangrum in 1973

Background information
- Also known as: The Knowbody Else (1963–1970); Black Oak (1977-c.1984)
- Origin: Black Oak, Arkansas, U.S.
- Genres: Southern rock; country rock; boogie rock; hard rock
- Years active: 1963–present
- Label: Cleopatra Records

Black Oak Arkansas is an American Southern rock band named after the band's hometown of Black Oak, Arkansas. The band reached the height of its fame in the 1970s, charting ten albums. Their style is notable for multiple guitar players and the raspy voice and on-stage antics of vocalist Jim "Dandy" Mangrum.

== History ==
=== The Knowbody Else ===
Black Oak Arkansas, originally named "The Knowbody Else", was formed in 1963 by some "high school pals" living in the area around Black Oak, Arkansas. Original members included Ronnie "Chicky Hawk" Smith (vocals), Rickie Lee (alternately "Risky" or "Ricochet") Reynolds (guitar), Stanley "Goober Grin" Knight (guitar), Harvey "Burley" Jett (guitar), Pat "Dirty" Daugherty (bass), and Wayne "Squeezebox" Evans (drums). At some point the band and Ronnie "Chicky Hawk" Smith agreed that a mutual friend named James "Jim Dandy" Mangrum would make a better front man, while Smith agreed that he himself would make a better stage production manager.

The band's first PA system was stolen from Monette High School. The group cleaned out an old galvanized grain bin on the edge of town and began blasting out ear-piercing sounds that echoed their blend of music that came from rock, gospel, country and blues influences. Members of the group were subsequently charged in absentia with grand larceny and sentenced to 26 years at the Tucker Prison Farm, a sentence that was later suspended. That led to their retreat to the hills of rural north-central Arkansas where they lived off the land and refined their musical style. They also lived in Long Beach, Mississippi, and played at the local Loeb theater/dance hall and the short-lived venue, "The Black Rainbow". Some of their influences during that time were the Beatles and the Byrds.

The Knowbody Else moved to Memphis, Tennessee, in 1969 and signed a record deal with Stax Records. Their self-titled debut album (Hip Records #HIS-7003 [a subsidiary of Stax]) was largely ignored by the public. During that time the band became interested in psychedelia and Eastern spiritualism which, combined with their Southern Baptist upbringing, contributed to their sound.

=== Black Oak Arkansas ===
After several trips to Los Angeles, California, in 1970, the band was signed by Atco Records (whose parent label, Atlantic Records, once had a partnership with Stax) and rechristened Black Oak Arkansas. Their self-titled debut album Black Oak Arkansas was released in 1971. The record featured BOA classics such as "Hot and Nasty", "Lord Have Mercy On My Soul", "Uncle Lijiah" (written in pseudo-tribute to Harvey Jett's real-life great uncle) and "When Electricity Came To Arkansas", which fundamentalist religious groups claimed contained backward-masked "Satanic messages" (possibly from a live performance of the song in which Mangrum utters "dog si eh" and "natas" three times). The band toured extensively, gaining a reputation as a premier live act throughout the early 1970s across America, and later in Europe. Keep the Faith followed in 1972, featuring the concert staple "Fever in My Mind". Drummer Wayne Evans left the band and was replaced by drummer Tommy Aldridge on BOA's next release If an Angel Came to See You, Would You Make Her Feel at Home?, which featured another BOA concert favorite, "Mutants of the Monster" and expanded on the group's eclectic musical style.

In 1973, Black Oak Arkansas released their fourth LP, Raunch 'n' Roll Live, and took the unorthodox tack of including previously unreleased new songs on their first live concert album such as "Gigolo", "Gettin' Kinda Cocky", as well as two more BOA classics: "Hot Rod", featuring Dandy's double-entendre lyrics, and "Up", which spotlighted Aldridge's marathon drum solo, a portion of which he played with his bare hands. The four new songs were originally recorded and intended to be included on the follow-up studio album to If an Angel Came to See You ..., but when Atco Records realized the band's strong suit was their concert act, the live album resulted. Raunch 'n' Roll Live was re-issued in 2007 by Rhino Records as a 2-CD set containing both concerts that the original vinyl album was culled from. The band's fifth album, High on the Hog, also released in 1973, ended up being the high point of BOA's career, peaking at number 52 on the Billboard albums chart. Ruby Starr also toured intermittently with Black Oak during this period, and her raspy voice can be heard on the group's remake of LaVern Baker's 1957 hit "Jim Dandy (To The Rescue)", which reached number 25 on the Billboard Hot 100. Baker's song was recorded at the suggestion of Tom Dowd, who produced the album and was the engineer on the original LaVern Baker single.

The band was riding high on the concert trail by this time, headlining venues like Kansas City's Arrowhead Stadium and Charlotte Motor Speedway, and the Royal Albert Hall in London, England. Black Oak Arkansas also played at the California Jam festival in Ontario, California, on April 6, 1974. The concert attracted over 200,000 fans, and BOA appeared alongside Black Sabbath; Eagles; Emerson, Lake & Palmer; Deep Purple; Earth, Wind & Fire; Seals and Crofts; and Rare Earth. Portions of the show were telecast on ABC Television in the US, exposing the band to a wider audience.

The follow-up to High on the Hog, 1974's Street Party (featuring "Son of a Gun", "Brink of Creation", "Hey Ya'll" and "Dixie", as well as a cover of the Motown classic "Dancing in the Street"), failed to maintain the momentum, but another 1974 release entitled Early Times, a shelved Stax recording by The Knowbody Else (now released on the back of their success and under the BOA banner), kept the band in the public eye. Guitarist Harvey Jett left the band after Street Party and was replaced by Jimmy "Soybean" Henderson in 1975 and he debuted on the band's final studio album for Atco Records, Ain't Life Grand. This album included a remake of George Harrison's Beatles classic "Taxman", as well as new originals like "Fancy Nancy", "Rebel", "Good Stuff", "Cryin' Shame", and "Let Life Be Good to You". The band signed a contract with MCA and promptly released X-Rated in 1975, which marked the beginning of Black Oak Arkansas's decline. In 1976, they released two nondescript and unsuccessful albums for MCA, Balls of Fire and 10 Yr Overnight Success, the latter as a five-piece band with the departure of Rickie Reynolds, who was replaced on tour by keyboardist Marius Penczner during this period. Also in 1976, Atco released a final BOA contractual-obligation album, the poorly-recorded but high-spirited Live! Mutha, recorded on Mother's Day, 1975, in Long Beach, California. This recording saw a reappearance of Ruby Starr.

=== Black Oak ===
Following continued diminishing returns of the band's record sales (while still remaining a consistent concert draw), Mangrum dropped "Arkansas" from the group's name in an attempt to downplay their Southern-ness and replaced everyone except Henderson. He even altered his own vocal style in an attempt to sound more mainstream (and ostensibly impress music critics in the process). The other members of the "Black Oak" lineup were Greg Reding (guitar and keyboards), Jack Holder (guitar), Andy Tanas (bass), and Joel Williams (drums). Black Oak released two albums on the struggling Capricorn Records, Race with the Devil in 1977 and I'd Rather Be Sailing the following year. Neither album sold well. In 1978, guitarist Shawn Lane joined the band at age 14 and toured with the band for four years.

=== Post-Capricorn Records ===
In the early 1980s, Dandy temporarily left the band for health reasons, but Reynolds kept the band going with former Zorro bassist Jack Brumby, AW Zeugner, and Les John. Bob Simpson took on lead vocals at first, but was later replaced by Randy Ruff for almost three years, until Mangrum's return. In 1984, the band released Ready as Hell. Though the name "Black Oak Arkansas" was on the album cover, "Jim Dandy" appeared above it in larger type, almost as if it were a solo effort. Ready as Hell featured a heavier sound with pinch harmonics and keyboards featured throughout. The album was also Rickie Lee Reynolds's first recording with Mangrum since the MCA years. In 1986, The Black Attack Is Back continued the heavy style of the previous album and featured the particularly adventurous track "I Want A Woman With Big Titties". Again, "Jim Dandy" received top billing on the album cover (though "BOA"—the band's initials—did appear above the frontman's name). Like its predecessor, The Black Attack Is Back made no commercial headway. In 1992, the band released Rebound, this time under the band's aegis, with similar results. Things changed little with 1999's The Wild Bunch, which was released under the name "Jim Dandy's Black Oak Arkansas". However, an original member would rejoin Black Oak and appear on this album. Patrick "Dirty" Daugherty rejoined in 1995, rekindling the once-forgotten Black Oak Arkansas. This momentum brought on a surge of performances with other 70's greats such as Foghat, Iron Butterfly, Edgar Winter Group, and many more. During the early 2000s, original lead guitarist Stanley Knight would join them on the road, not playing guitar, but as their soundman. Pat left the band a second time in the mid-2000s.

James Mangrum has continued recording and touring with a series of different Black Oak lineups, up to the present day. Black Oak Arkansas currently enjoys a loyal fan following. Jim Dandy is credited with inspiring Van Halen frontman David Lee Roth's image and onstage persona. In addition, in the 1980s former Maine State Representative Chris Greeley once 'opened' for them as a member of the rock band Toyz.

=== The return to Atlantic Records ===
The band released an album for Atlantic Records/Atco Records on October 15, 2013, titled Back Thar N' Over Yonder. The album contained five newly recorded songs and 10 previously unreleased 1970s tracks which were produced by Tom Dowd. The new songs featured a lineup of original and current members. Reunited originals Jim "Dandy" Mangrum, Rickie Lee "Risky" Reynolds, Pat "Dirty" Daugherty, and Jimmy "Soybean" Henderson, were joined by current drummer Johnnie Bolin, bassist George Hughen, guitarist Buddy Church and lead guitarist Hal McCormack. The first single off the record "Plugged In And Wired" was released August 26, 2013. The band toured to support the album.

=== 2019 to present ===
On May 24, 2019, Black Oak Arkansas released Underdog Heroes, their first album consisting of all new recordings in 30 years. The album featured founding members Jim Dandy Mangrum and Rickie Lee Reynolds, and Sammy B Seauphine as an additional vocalist. On September 22, 2023, the band released The Devil's Jukebox, a cover album, on Cleopatra Records.

In 2024, the new lineup for Black Oak Arkansas was unveiled, featuring Jim Dandy on lead vocals, Sammy Seauphine on duet vocals, Kinley Wolfe on bass guitar, Josh Decker on rhythm guitar, and Chris Craig on drums. The lineup debuted on March 1st as the opening act for Rickey Medlocke in Medina, Minnesota.

In 2025, the band embarked on a mini-tour of the West Coast, featuring an appearance the 53rd anniversary party for the Rainbow Bar & Grill in West Hollywood, California. On April 12th, Jim joined Michael Monroe onstage for a performance of the Black Oak Arkansas song "Rock N' Roll." Black Oak was joined by Monster Magnet guitarist Ed Mundell at the Rainbow anniversary party for a performance of "Space Lord," which the band covered on their album The Devil's Jukebox, as well as the Black Oak classic "Mutants of the Monster."

== Members ==
=== Classic–era members (1970–74) ===
- Rickie Lee "Risky"/"Ricochet" Reynolds – rhythm guitar, 12-string guitar, vocals (1965–1977, 1984–2021) (died 2021)
- Harvey "Burley" Jett – lead guitar, banjo, piano, vocals (1965–1974) (died 2022)
- Pat "Dirty" Daugherty – bass guitar, vocals (1965–1977, 1996–2002)
- Wayne "Squeezebox" Evans – drums (1965–1972)
- James L. Mangrum ("Jim Dandy") – lead vocals, washboard (1968–1982, 1984–present)
- Stanley "Goober Grin" Knight – lead guitar, steel guitar, organ, vocals (1969–1976) (died 2013)
- Tommy Aldridge – drums (1972–1976)

=== Current touring band members ===
- James L. Mangrum ("Jim Dandy") – lead vocals, washboard (1968–1982, 1984–present)
- Sammy B. Seauphine ("Lil Bit") – duet & backing vocals, washboard, harmonica (2013–present)
- Justin Velte – rhythm guitar, backing vocals (2026–present)
- Drew DeFrance – lead guitar (2026–present)
- Connor Roach – bass, backing vocals (2026–present)
- Nathan Weatherford – drums (2026–present)

=== Other past members ===
- Ronnie "Chicky Hawk" Smith – lead vocals (1965–1968)
- Ruby Starr – duet vocals, backing vocals (1973–1976) (died 1995)
- Jimmy "Soybean" Henderson – guitar (1975–1979) (died 2016)
- Marius Penczner – keyboards (1975–1977)
- Darrell Miller – drums (1976)
- David "Dave" Mayo – piano, bass guitar (1976)
- Bobby "T" Torello – drums (1977)
- Joel Williams – drums (1977–1978)
- Andy Tanas – bass guitar (1977–1979)
- Deke Richards – guitar, piano (1977–1978)
- Greg Reding – guitar, keyboards, vocals (1977–1979)
- Jack Holder – guitar (1977–1979) (died 2015)
- Shawn Lane – guitar (1978–1982) (died 2003)
- Gary D. Rollins – keyboards (1978)
- Chris Craig – drums (1979–1982, 2023–2026)
- Dave Wilson – bass guitar (1979–1981) (died 2013)
- Billy Batte — keyboards, violin, backing vocals (1980-1984)
- Randy Ruff – lead vocals, piano, organ (1982–1984)
- Dave Amato – guitar (1980)
- Mick Chelsvig – guitar (1980–1981)
- Kinley "Barney" Wolfe – bass guitar, backing vocals (1981–1983, 2021–2026)
- Tony Bullard – guitar (1981–1982)
- Abel Ji McKnight – drums (early 1980s)
- Cozy Johnson – drums (early 1980s)
- George Hughen – bass guitar (1985–1996, 2002–2016)
- Johnnie Bolin – drums (1985–2024) (died 2024)
- Robert Gregory – guitar (1985)
- Angelo Earl – guitar (late 1980s)
- Buddy Church – guitar (1989–1994, 2013–2014) (died 2016)
- David Flexer - lead guitar (1995-1996,2017-2018)
- Hal McCormack – lead guitar (2003–2013)
- Kevin Rees – lead guitar (early 1980s)
- John Roth – lead guitar (July 1986–October 1987, 1991)
- Arthur Pearson – lead guitar, rhythm guitar (1989–2024) (died 2025)
- Kevyn Williams – lead guitar (early 1990s)
- Danny Leath – lead guitar (199?–????)
- Rocky Athas – lead guitar (1996–2001)
- Terry "Slydman" Powers – lead guitar (2000–2004) (died 2024)
- Paul Simmons – drums (1985–1986)
- Victor Lukenbaugh – drums (1987–1989, 2018–2020) (died 2020)
- Johnny Monk Courville – drums (1989-1996, 2021)
- Tim Rossi – rhythm guitar (2021–2024)
- Sammi Jo Bishop – drums (2022)
- Ed Mundell – lead and rhythm guitar (2025)
- Luke Williams – rhythm guitar (2024–2026)
- Josh Decker – lead guitar (2024–2026)

=== Session members ===
- Kenny Rodgers – guitar
- Alex Among – guitar
- Steve "The Axe" Nunenmacher – lead guitar, rhythm guitar (Ready As Hell) Later formed Lillian Axe as 'Steve Blaze'
- William Lemuel – bass guitar (Ready As Hell)
- Jon "J.R."/"Thunder Paws" Wells – drums (Ready As Hell)
- Billy Batte — keyboards, violin, backing vocals (Ready As Hell)
- Michael "Narley Dude" Martin – lead guitar (The Black Attack Is Back) (died 2005)
- Biff "The Beast" Bingham – 2nd lead guitar (Ready As Hell, The Black Attack Is Back)
- Mike Farriss – bass guitar (The Black Attack Is Back)
- Jerry A. Williams – drums (Ready As Hell, The Black Attack Is Back)
- Garrett Bearden – drums (1980s)
- Mickey "Tricky" Smith – drums, road tech

== Discography ==
=== Albums ===
==== The Knowbody Else ====
- The Knowbody Else (Hip Records #HIS-7003 [a subsidiary of Stax Records], October 1969; 2008 via Purple Pyramid/Cleopatra Records)
- Early Times (Stax Records, March 1974; demoes from 1968/1969)
- Soldiers of Pure Peace (Arf! Arf! Music, November 13, 2012; demoes from 1967)

==== Black Oak Arkansas ====
- Black Oak Arkansas (Atco Records, March 1971) US No. 127, RIAA Gold
- Keep the Faith (Atco, January 1972) US No. 103
- If an Angel Came to See You, Would You Make Her Feel at Home? (Atco, June 1972) US No. 93
- High on the Hog (Atco, September 1973) US No. 52, RIAA Gold; Can. No. 81
- Street Party (Atco, July 1974) US No. 56; Can No. 52
- Ain't Life Grand (Atco, April 1975) US No. 145
- X-Rated (MCA Records, September 1975) US No. 99
- Balls of Fire (MCA, May 1976) US No. 173; Can No. 71
- 10 Yr Overnight Success (MCA, October 1976)
- Rebound (Goldwax Records #GW-5003, 1991)
- Back Thar N' Over Yonder (Atlantic/Atco Records, October 15, 2013; 5 new songs with 10 studio outtakes from 1972–1974)

==== as "Black Oak" ====
- Race with the Devil (Capricorn Records, November 1977)
- I'd Rather Be Sailing (Capricorn, June 1978)

==== as "Jim Dandy's Black Oak Arkansas" ====
- Ready as Hell (Hacienda Records, 1984)
- The Black Attack is Back (Heavy Metal America Records, 1986)
- The Wild Bunch (Deadline/Cleopatra Records, November 2, 1999)
- Underdog Heroes (Cleopatra Records) May 24, 2019
- The Devil's Jukebox (Cleopatra Records) 2023

==== Live releases ====
- Raunch 'N' Roll Live (Atco, February 1973; US No. 90, RIAA Gold
- Live! Mutha (Atco, January 1976; recorded May 11, 1975) US No. 194; Can No. 90
- King Biscuit Flower Hour Presents: Black Oak Arkansas (King Biscuit Flower Hour Records/BMG, March 10, 1998; recorded November 21, 1976, at the Reading Festival in England)
- Live at Royal Albert Hall (S'More Entertainment, November 25, 2005; recorded 1975)
- The Complete Raunch 'N' Roll Live (Rhino Handmade Records, 2007) 2CD

==== Appearances ====
- Flash Fearless Vs. the Zorg Women, Pts. 5 & 6 (Chrysalis Records, 1975; tracks "Country Cooking" and "Blast Off", Jim Dandy solo)
- Top Musicians Play ZZ Top (Sleeping Giant Records, 2010; track "La Grange", as Jim Dandy's Black Oak Arkansas)

=== Compilations ===
- Hot and Nasty (The Best of Black Oak Arkansas) (Atlantic/WEA [UK], 1974)
- The Best of Black Oak Arkansas (Atco, April 1977)
- Hot & Nasty: The Best of Black Oak Arkansas (Rhino Records, 1992)
- 'Hot And Nasty' And Other Hits (Flashback/Rhino Records, 1997)
- The Definitive Rock Collection (Atlantic/Rhino Records, October 17, 2006) 2-CD set

=== Charted singles ===
- "Jim Dandy (To the Rescue)" (Atco, December 1973; from the High on the Hog album) US No. 25; Can No. 12
- "Strong Enough to Be Gentle" (MCA, January 1976; from the X-Rated album) US No. 89
