= Kulić =

Kulić (Serbian Cyrillic: Кулић) is South Slavic surname. Notable people with the surname include:

- Dinka Kulić (born 1997), Croatian volleyball player
- Slavko Kulić (born 1941), Croatian scientist and economist concerned with the sociology of international relations
- Zoran Kulić (born 1975), Serbian former football midfielder

== See also ==
- Kulič (disambiguation)
- Kulich (surname)
