= List of autoharp players =

Some notable professional autoharp performers include:

- Ken Crames
- Jon Anderson
- Brittain Ashford
- Bryan Bowers
- Jeff Bridges
- Amanda Brown
- Basia Bulat
- Maybelle Carter
- June Carter Cash
- Billy Connolly
- Billy Corgan of The Smashing Pumpkins
- Don Craine of Downliners Sect
- Sheryl Crow
- Grey DeLisle
- Ed Droste of Grizzly Bear
- Judy Dyble
- Mary Epworth
- Sylvia Fricker of Ian & Sylvia
- KatieJane Garside of Ruby Throat, Queenadreena, Daisy Chainsaw
- Marc Gunn
- Steve Hackett
- PJ Harvey
- Peter Hayes of Black Rebel Motorcycle Club
- Pomme
- Linda McCartney
- Imogen Heap of Frou Frou
- Dorris Henderson
- Brian Jones of The Rolling Stones
- Kevin Cadogan of Third Eye Blind
- Janis Joplin
- Mark Kelly of Marillion
- Natasha Khan and Ginger Lee of Bat for Lashes
- Hayley Kiyoko
- Glenn Kotche of Wilco
- David Lindley
- James Lowe of The Electric Prunes
- Jeff Lynne
- Jeff Martin of The Tea Party
- Lyle Mays
- Nick McCabe of The Verve
- John McEnroe
- Bill Miller of Roky Erickson and the Aliens
- Joni Mitchell
- Martin Molin of Wintergatan
- Joanna Newsom
- Johanna Söderberg (First Aid Kit (band))
- Of Montreal
- Dolly Parton
- Roger Penney of Bermuda Triangle Band
- Mike Pinder of The Moody Blues
- Dax Pierson of Anticon-related groups Subtle, Themselves and 13 & God
- Doug Pratt
- Corinne Bailey Rae
- Ratatat
- Harvey Reid
- John Sebastian of The Lovin' Spoonful
- Mike Seeger
- Amy Dutronc of Smokers Die Younger
- Peggy Seeger
- Kilby Snow
- Jamie Stewart of Xiu Xiu
- Pop Stoneman
- Sunset Rubdown
- Tommy Shaw of Styx
- Rennie Sparks of The Handsome Family
- Avey Tare
- Tracey Thorn of Everything But The Girl, and solo
- Matthew J. Tow of The Lovetones
- Trixie Mattel
- Steven Wilson
- Patrick Wolf
- Shara Worden of My Brightest Diamond

== See also ==
- List of accordionists
- List of banjo players
- List of cellists
- List of didgeridoo players
- List of euphonium players
- List of flautists
- List of guitarists
- List of harmonicists
