= List of pop and rock pianists =

This is an alphabetized list of notable pianists who play or played pop and rock music.

== A ==
- Gracie Abrams
- Kris Allen
- Art Alexakis
- Tori Amos
- Trey Anastasio (Phish)
- Benny Andersson
- Fiona Apple
- David Archuleta
- Billie Joe Armstrong (Green Day)
- Kenneth Ascher
- Tony Ashton
- Aslyn
- Bryce Avary (The Rocket Summer)

== B ==
- Bill Bailey
- Burt Bacharach
- Alex Band (The Calling)
- Anita Baker
- Tony Banks
- Steve Barakatt
- Sara Bareilles
- Samantha Barks
- Gary Barlow (Take That)
- Joshua Bassett
- Mark Batson
- Eric Bazilian (The Hooters)
- Barry Beckett (Muscle Shoals Rhythm Section)
- Drake Bell
- Richard Bell (Janis Joplin, The Band)
- Thom Bell
- Matt Bellamy (Muse)
- Bill Berry
- Diane Birch
- Saraya-Jade Bevis
- Roy Bittan
- Jon Bon Jovi
- James Booker
- Roddy Bottum (Faith No More)
- Owen Bradley
- Michelle Branch
- Jim Brickman
- David Briggs (Muscle Shoals Rhythm Section, Area Code 615, The Nashville A-Team)
- Gary Brooker (Procol Harum)
- Dudley Brooks (The Blue Moon Boys, The Crickets)
- Tony Brown
- Jackson Browne
- David Bryan
- Jessie Buckley
- Kim Bullard
- John Bundrick
- Terry Burrus
- Kate Bush
- Artie Butler
- Larry Butler
- Brad Buxer

== C ==
- Jonathan Cain
- John Cale
- Vanessa Carlton
- Tim Carmon
- Richard Carpenter
- Sabrina Carpenter
- David Cassidy
- Jo Ann Castle
- Leonard Caston Jr.
- Nick Cave
- Les Claypool (Primus)
- Greyson Chance
- Ray Charles
- Richard Clayderman
- Doug Clifford
- Nat King Cole
- Rahn Coleman
- Phil Collins
- Chi Coltrane
- Harry Connick Jr.
- Russ Conway
- Kyle Cook (Matchbox Twenty)
- Stu Cook
- Floyd Cramer
- Dave Crawford
- Kevin Cronin (REO Speedwagon)
- Sheryl Crow
- Allison Crowe
- Jamie Cullum
- Burton Cummings (The Guess Who)
- Miley Cyrus

== D ==
- Ray Davies
- Rick Davies
- Paul Davis
- John Deacon (Queen)
- Deadmau5
- Chris de Burgh
- Brian Dee
- Lynsey De Paul
- Franco De Vita
- Gavin DeGraw
- Dennis DeYoung
- Al De Lory
- Alycia Debnam-Carey (Tender Engine voices)
- Raúl di Blasio
- Jim Dickinson
- Fats Domino
- Craig Doerge (The Section)
- Paul Doucette (Matchbox Twenty)
- Neal Doughty (REO Speedwagon)
- Dr. John
- Daryl Dragon (Captain & Tennille)
- Nick Drake
- Bob Dylan
- Jakob Dylan

== E ==
- The Edge (U2)
- Keith Emerson
- Bobby Emmons (The Memphis Boys)
- Brian Eno
- John Evan
- Tommy Eyre

== F ==
- Donald Fagen (Steely Dan)
- Agnetha Fältskog
- Billy Field
- Victor Feldman
- Johnny Fingers
- Mike Finnigan
- Five for Fighting
- Roberta Flack
- Tom Fletcher
- Chloe Flower
- Dan Fogelberg
- John Fogerty
- Ben Folds
- David Foster
- Aretha Franklin
- Jason Freese
- Glenn Frey
- Robert Fripp
- Hans-Jürgen Fritz (Triumvirat)
- Craig Frost

== G ==
- Peter Gabriel
- Gackt Camui
- Lady Gaga
- Charly García
- Mike Garson
- Marvin Gaye
- Aviv Geffen
- Stefani Germanotta (Lady Gaga)
- Maurice Gibb (Bee Gees)
- Gregg Giuffria
- Dwayne Goettel
- Andrew Gold
- Selena Gomez
- Phillip Goodhand-Tait
- Delta Goodrem
- Conan Gray
- David Gray
- Dave Greenslade
- Jonny Greenwood (Radiohead)
- Paul Griffin
- Johnny Griffith
- Christina Grimmie
- Dave Grohl
- Horacio Gutierrez

== H ==
- Emily Haines
- Daryl Hall
- Jan Hammer
- Peter Hammill (Van der Graaf Generator)
- Arthur Hanlon
- Taylor Hanson
- Ed Harcourt
- Glen Hardin (The Crickets, TCB Band)
- Corey Hart
- Donny Hathaway
- Isaac Hayes
- Imogen Heap
- Jimi Hendrix
- Don Henley
- Ken Hensley (Uriah Heep)
- Melissa Morrison Higgins
- David Hodges
- Roger Hodgson (Supertramp)
- Jacob Hoggard (Hedley)
- Jools Holland
- Tuomas Holopainen (Nightwish)
- Danielle Hope
- Nicky Hopkins
- Bruce Hornsby
- Paul Hornsby (The Marshall Tucker Band)
- Joey Huffman
- Grayson Hugh
- Joe Hunter
- Eric Hutchinson
- Dick Hyman
- Rob Hyman (The Hooters)

== I ==
- Dami Im

== J ==
- Janet Jackson
- Joe Jackson
- Michael Jackson
- Randy Jackson
- Mick Jagger
- Bob James
- Keith Jarrett (King Crimson)
- John Barlow Jarvis
- Chris Jasper
- Arthur Jenkins
- Karl Jenkins Soft Machine
- Billy Joel
- Elton John
- Booker T. Jones (Booker T. & the M.G.'s)
- Howard Jones
- John Paul Jones
- Norah Jones
- Rickie Lee Jones
- Johnnie Johnson
- Bruce Johnston
- Joe Jonas
- Kevin Jonas
- Nick Jonas
- Scott Joplin
- Bradley Joseph
- Tyler Joseph
- Tim Jupp
- Victoria Justice

== K ==
- Yuki Kajiura
- Tony Kaye (Yes)
- Shane Keister
- Paula Kelley
- Mark Kelly
- R. Kelly
- Ron Kersey
- Alicia Keys
- Carole King
- Larry Knechtel
- Todor Kobakov
- Al Kooper
- Chantal Kreviazuk
- Diana Krall
- Lenny Kravitz

== L ==
- Denny Laine
- Robert Lamm (Chicago)
- Dustin Lanker (Cherry Poppin' Daddies, The Visible Men)
- Avril Lavigne
- Chuck Leavell
- Amy Lee (Evanescence)
- Thijs Van Leer (Focus)
- John Legend
- Tom Lehrer
- John Lennon
- Martin Leung
- Jerry Lee Lewis
- Liberace
- Little Richard
- Jon Lord (Deep Purple)
- Christian "Flake" Lorenz (Rammstein)
- Demi Lovato

== M ==
- Tony MacAlpine
- Ron Mael (Sparks)
- Les Maguire
- Dmitry Malikov
- Barry Manilow
- Bob Malone
- Richard Manuel (The Band)
- Ray Manzarek
- Laura Marano
- Marina and the Diamonds
- Page McConnell (Phish)
- Bruno Mars
- Tommy Mars
- Anthony Marinelli (Michael Jackson's Thriller, Kenny Loggins)
- Chris Martin (Coldplay)
- George Martin (The Beatles, Wings, Gerry and the Pacemakers)
- Richard Marx
- James Maslow
- Andre Matos
- Dave Matthews
- John McAll
- Jesse McCartney
- Linda McCartney
- Paul McCartney
- Clarence McDonald
- Michael McDonald
- Goldy McJohn (Steppenwolf)
- Nellie McKay
- Brian McKnight
- Sarah McLachlan
- Ian McLagan
- Jon Mclaughlin
- Andrew McMahon
- Christine McVie
- Shawn Mendes
- Natalie Merchant
- Freddie Mercury (Queen)
- AJ Michalka
- Aly Michalka
- Jackie Miclau
- Lisa Middelhauve (Xandria)
- Amos Milburn
- Tomo Miličević (Thirty Seconds to Mars)
- Bill Miller (Frank Sinatra, Frank Sinatra Jr.)
- Ben Mills
- Mike Mills
- Ronnie Milsap
- Tim Minchin
- Ben Mink
- Kerry Minnear (Gentle Giant)
- Joni Mitchell
- Money Mark (Beastie Boys, The Claypool Lennon Delirium)
- Gilbert Montagné
- Ben Moody
- Patrick Moraz (Refugee, Yes, Moody Blues)
- Jason Mraz

== N ==
- Graham Nash
- Steve Nathan (Muscle Shoals Rhythm Section, The Nashville A-Team)
- Bobbie Nelson
- Art Neville (The Meters, The Neville Brothers)
- Ivan Neville
- Randy Newman
- Joanna Newsom
- Stevie Nicks
- Steve Nieve
- Willie Nile
- Jack Nitzsche
- Laura Nyro

== O ==
- Conor Oberst
- Bobby Ogdin (TCB Band, The Marshall Tucker Band)
- Mike Oldfield
- Spooner Oldham
- Michael Omartian
- Alan Osmond
- Donny Osmond
- Wayne Osmond
- Gilbert O'Sullivan

== P ==
- Fito Páez
- David Paich
- Amanda Palmer
- Bill Payne
- Charlie Peacock
- Leon Pendarvis
- Roger Penney
- Freddie Perren
- Christina Perri
- Niamh Perry
- Norman Petty (The Crickets, Buddy Holly)
- Tom Petty
- Liz Phair
- Greg Phillinganes
- Dave Pirner
- Pierre-Yves Plat
- Morris Pleasure
- Steve Porcaro
- Billy Powell (Lynyrd Skynyrd)
- Daniel Powter
- Billy Preston
- Don Preston
- Prince
- Vadim Pruzhanov
- Bill Pursell
- Charlie Puth

== Q ==
- Sara Quin
- Tegan Quin

== R ==
- Bonnie Raitt
- Don Randi
- Mike Ratledge Soft Machine
- Eddie Rayner (Split Enz)
- Dizzy Reed (Guns N' Roses)
- Trent Reznor (Nine Inch Nails)
- Tim Rice-Oxley (Keane)
- Keith Richards
- Lionel Richie
- Francis Rimbert
- Billy Ritchie
- Tyson Ritter (The All-American Rejects)
- Chappell Roan
- Hargus "Pig" Robbins
- Smokey Robinson
- Olivia Rodrigo
- Shahrdad Rohani
- Gregg Rolie (Santana, Journey)
- Matt Rollings
- Aldemaro Romero
- Axl Rose (Guns N' Roses)
- Ryan Ross (Panic! at the Disco)
- Michel Rubini
- Jordan Rudess (also a jazz pianist)
- Todd Rundgren
- Patrice Rushen
- Ruslana
- Brenda Russell
- Leon Russell
- Jenny Ryan

== S ==
- Joe Sample
- David Sancious
- Pete Sears
- Neil Sedaka
- Bob Seger
- Ralph Schuckett
- Paul Shaffer
- Derek Sherinian (Dream Theater)
- Mike Shinoda (Linkin Park)
- Bunny Sigler
- Nicole Simone
- Nina Simone
- Ray Singleton
- Isaac Slade (The Fray)
- Grace Slick (Jefferson Airplane)
- Robert Smith (The Cure)
- Tom Snow
- Regina Spektor
- Bruce Springsteen
- Chris Stainton
- Rachel Stevens
- Dave Stewart
- Ian Stewart (The Rolling Stones)
- Stephen Stills
- Barrett Strong
- Patrick Stump
- Taylor Swift

== T ==
- Richard Tandy
- Serj Tankian
- James Taylor
- Roger Taylor (Queen)
- Ryan Tedder (OneRepublic)
- Richard Tee
- Benmont Tench
- Vienna Teng
- John Tesh
- Matt Thiessen
- Marvell Thomas
- Rob Thomas (Matchbox Twenty)
- Sonny Thompson
- Yann Tiersen
- Justin Timberlake
- Keith Tippett
- Allen Toussaint
- Pete Townshend
- Meghan Trainor
- Alex Turner (Arctic Monkeys)
- Archie Turner (Hi Rhythm Section)
- Ike Turner
- Tarja Turunen
- Aphex Twin
- Steven Tyler (Aerosmith)

== U ==
- Brendon Urie (Panic! at the Disco)
- Michael Utley

== V ==
- Ruben Valtierra
- Earl Van Dyke (The Funk Brothers)
- Vangelis
- Eddie Van Halen
- Marián Varga
- Joe Vitale

== W ==
- Andrew W. K.
- Rufus Wainwright
- Tom Waits
- Adam Wakeman
- Oliver Wakeman
- Rick Wakeman
- Don Walker
- Joe Walsh
- Steve Walsh (Kansas)
- Biff Watson
- Barry White
- Norman Whitfield
- Bobby Whitlock
- Roger Williams
- Ann Wilson (Heart)
- Brian Wilson
- Carl Wilson
- Dennis Wilson
- George Winston
- Edgar Winter
- Steve Winwood
- Bill Withers
- Patrick Wolf
- Peter Wolf
- Stevie Wonder
- Alan White (Yes, Magnification)
- Gary Wright
- Richard Wright (Pink Floyd)
- Zakk Wylde
- Bill Wyman
- Reese Wynans

== Y ==
- Rachael Yamagata
- Yanni
- Akiko Yano
- Thom Yorke (Radiohead)
- Neil Young
- Yoshiki (X Japan)

== Z ==
- Warren Zevon
- Torrie Zito
