= The Cherry People =

American band

- Also known as: The English Setters
- Origin: Washington, D.C., US
- Genres: Sunshine pop; bubblegum
- Years active: 1967–1975, 2005–present (as Cherry People Acoustic)
- Labels: Heritage, Hot Cotton
- Members: Chris Grimes; Doug Grimes; Michael Fath; Jude Vitilio
- Past members: Punky Meadows

The Cherry People are an American pop band from Washington, D.C., United States. Their track "And Suddenly" reached number 45 on the Hot 100 in 1968.

== History ==
The English Setters changed its name to the Cherry People and traveled to New York City several times to perform at nightclubs. During a show at Café Wha? the band was seen by producer Ron Haffkine, which led to a new five-year management contract with Jerry Ross Productions and a deal with Heritage Records. The Cherry People were the first group to be released by the MGM-distributed label. The group were promoted nationally by Jerry Ross with Dick Clark on American Bandstand, where they debuted their single "And Suddenly".

The band spent the fall of 1967 recording their debut album at Bell Sound Studios in New York City. Haffkine hired Barry Oslander to co-produce and a number of studio musicians were used to replace the band members during recording. When the eponymous album was released in May 1968, it had a bubblegum pop sound. The band toured the country in support of the album, including a show at Whisky a Go Go on Sunset Strip. In April 1969 Chris Grimes, Punky Meadows, Rocky Isaac, Al Marks, Doug Grimes and Jan Zukowski went to New York to try to negotiate a release from their recording contract. Unable to get a meeting with Jerry Ross the band went to a jam session at Steve Paul's Scene, where they met Jimi Hendrix, Billy Cox and another person. Hendrix needed a drummer and invited the whole band to the studio, so Isaac, Grimes, Marks, and Zukowski went to the Record Plant and recorded three tracks with Hendrix: "Room Full Of Mirrors", "Crash Landing", and "Stone Free Again", with Isaac on drums, Marks and Grimes on percussion, and Zukowski on bass (though this was not used on the tracks). Two days later the band returned for another session, during which they recorded "Bleeding Heart" and "Drone Blues". All the tracks were later released on Experience Hendrix reissues.

In the spring of 1969 the band returned to Washington, D.C., adopting a more hard rock sound. They took a job as house band at the Silver Dollar throughout the remainder of 1969 and 1970, and worked most nights a week at the Georgetown nightclub, also playing one-off shows at venues including the Greenbelt Armory, the Bladensburg Firehouse, St. Mary's Church in Landover Hills, St. Ambrose Church in Cheverly, and The Wedge (a teen club in the Bethesda Youth Center in Montgomery County, Maryland). On October 19, 1969, the Cherry People headlined the Intercollegiate Music Festival at the Sylvan Theatre on the Mall in Washington, D.C., in front of a crowd of over 10,000. The band also headlined concerts at the Falls Church Community Center in Virginia on March 7, 1970, and the University of Maryland's Ritchie Coliseum on April 30, 1970. They continued playing the Silver Dollar in 1970 as well as a long stint at The Keg throughout 1971 and into 1972. Still trapped by the Jerry Gross Productions-Heritage Records contract, the band self-produced a single, "Sea and Me", backed with "Come on Over", and released it on their own label, Hot Cotton (a division of Tracy Records). In June 1972, as a result of the five years of constant nightclub work, Rocky Isaac left the band and was replaced by Mike Zack, who in turn was replaced by T.C. Tolliver, a drummer from Southeast Washington, D.C., who had previously played with a soul band called J.J. and the Invaders. Lead guitarist Punky Meadows also left and joined BUX. A month later The Cherry People stopped playing.

After a short break, Chris and Doug Grimes began auditioning musicians at The Keg later that summer and organized a schedule of nightclub dates in Boston, Massachusetts. The new lineup consisted of the Grimes Brothers in their previous roles, Tolliver on drums, bassist Mark Hughes from Wheaton, Maryland (born September 13, 1951) who had previously played with Blitz, Rockinghorse and Link Wray, and a guitarist from Camp Springs, Maryland, named Chris Noe (born December 5, 1951) who had previously played in Spread Eagle and Black on White.

The Cherry People left Boston and returned to Washington, D.C., to play at the Keg in December 1972. At this time Noe was replaced by Wayne Tomlinson of Landover Hills, Maryland. Throughout 1973 the band played at The Bayou, The Keg, and The Crazy Horse, with appearances from former members Pick Kelly, Mike Zack, and Jan Zukowski.

Late in the year the Grimes Brothers were offered work at a nightclub called Beginnings in Schaumburg, Illinois. They relaunched the band as a quintet with three new members: lead guitarist Rick Benick (born January 23, 1952), from Forest Heights, Maryland, who had previously played in Hailstone; bassist Andre Sokol (born January 8, 1954), who lived in Oxon Hill, Maryland, and had played in Hailstone and Earth; and drummer Barry Brandt (born November 14, 1951), who was raised in Wheaton, Maryland, and had recently played in Earth. The band spent 1974 between Chicago and Washington, D.C.

In 1975, Brandt and founding member Chris Grimes both left the band, to be replaced by drummer Steve Riley of Revere, Massachusetts, and guitarist David Namerdy of Arlington, Virginia, respectively.

For the first six months of 1975, the Cherry People (who during this period occasionally performed under the name Pearls) were based in the Varsity Grill, a Prince George's County nightclub on Baltimore Avenue in College Park that often booked heavy rock and roll bands, which was their last job as a band. The Cherry People played their final gig with a three-night stand at the Varsity Grill from June 19–21, 1975.

Rocky Isaac, drummer (born on November 19, 1946, in Newtown, Mingo County, West Virginia) died of Covid-19 on June 15, 2020, at age 73.

== Discography ==
=== Albums ===
- The Cherry People—Heritage HT 35,000 (mono)/HTS 35,000 (stereo) (1968)
- Nobody's Perfect (CD) The Cherry People (2010)
- Whoopin' & aWhoppin' (CD) The Cherry People—Angel Air Records

=== Singles ===
Year	A-Side	B-side	Label	Catalogue Number
1968	"And Suddenly"	"Imagination"	Heritage	801
1968	"I'm The One Who Loves You"	"Gotta Get Back (To The Good Life)	Heritage	807
1969	"Feelings"	"Mr. Hyde"	Heritage	810
1969	"Light Of Love"	"On To Something New"	Heritage	815
1971	"Sea And Me"	"Come On Over	Hot Cotton	(Unknown)
