= Without a Net (disambiguation) =

Without a Net is a recording of the Grateful Dead performing live in concert.

Without a Net may also refer to:

- Without a Net (Wayne Shorter album), 2013
- Without a Net: Librarians Bridging the Digital Divide, a 2011 book by Jessamyn West
- Without a Net: The Female Experience of Growing Up Working Class, a 2004 book by Michelle Tea
- Without a Net (film), a 2012 documentary film

== See also ==
- Live Without a Net (disambiguation)
