= Punky Meadows =

American guitarist (born 1950)

- Born: Edwin Lionel Meadows Jr. February 6, 1950 (age 76); Washington, D.C., U.S.
- Genres: Hard rock; heavy metal; progressive rock; glam rock
- Occupation: Guitarist
- Years active: 1964–1990, 2016–present
- Website: punkymeadowsofficial.com

Punky Meadows (born Edwin Lionel Meadows Jr. on February 6, 1950) is an American guitarist best known as a member of the band Angel between 1975 and 1980. He has often been recognized for his glam rock costumes and hair style.

== Background and early career ==
Meadows grew up in the Barnaby Terrace neighborhood of southeast Washington, D.C as the oldest of four brothers. He attended Draper Elementary and Hart Junior High Schools, the latter where he started playing guitar. Barnaby Terrace also produced guitar icons Danny Gatton, Roy Clark, and Link Wray.

In 1964 Meadows and three friends formed their first band, the Intruders. The band included Chris Grimes (born 1948), Doug Grimes (born 1951) and Larry Gray. All grew up listening to the Beatles and other British Invasion bands.

The group later became the English Setters, and opened for the Yardbirds, Neil Diamond, and the Young Rascals, while still in high school. In 1967, the English Setters changed their sound and changed their name to The Cherry People, and were signed to a record deal by Heritage Records. Meadows says that the record company promoted them as a "poor man's Monkees". They toured the United States briefly in 1968, appearing at Caesars Palace and on American Bandstand.

== Angel ==
After Cherry People disbanded, Meadows and Mickie Jones formed Daddy Warbux, later called BUX, which released one album. Angel formed after the two met Gregg Giuffria and then Barry Brandt and Frank Dimino, choosing the name "Angel" after the song by Jimi Hendrix, of whom Meadows was a fan.

Angel released studio albums from 1975 to 1979 and the live album Live Without a Net in 1980, and disbanded not long thereafter after not achieving mass critical or popular success, except in Japan. Meadows, however, both during his tenure with the band and thereafter was invited to join Kiss, Aerosmith, and the New York Dolls, all of which he turned down.

The band's glam rock image was said to be the antithesis of Kiss, and Meadows became the most strongly associated with the persona, so much so that Frank Zappa satirized his trademark pout and hair in the song "Punky's Whips". The song was first released in 1977 on Zappa In New York, but was deleted from most early copies due to a dispute between Zappa and Warner Bros., his record distributor. Meadows, however, was a fan of Zappa and was "flattered" by the song. Meadows eventually appeared onstage at a Zappa concert in his Angel costume.

== Life after Angel ==
Meadows had retired from the music business, and for 13 years owned and ran a tanning salon in Oakton, Virginia.

== Punky Meadows solo career (2015–present) ==
In 2015, Meadows announced a return to the music business. He released the solo album Fallen Angel on May 20, 2016, by Mainman Records. The album was written and produced by Punky Meadows and best friend Danny "Farrow" Anniello. Live shows followed. Billboard listed the album at #6 in the Top 100 New Artists, #25 in Top 100 Rock Albums, #32 in Top Independent Albums, and #133 in the Billboard Top 200 physical sales. The album was also released in Europe on Escape Music and in Japan on Rubicon Records.

Personnel on the album: Punky Meadows – lead guitar, rhythm guitar Danny Farrow – rhythm guitar, vocals Felix Robinson – bass guitar Chandler Mogel – lead vocals Bob Pantella – drums Charlie Calv – keyboards

== Discography ==
=== The English Setters 1965–1967 ===
- Tragedy b/w If She's All Right (March 1966)
- Someday You'll See b/w It Shouldn't Happen to a Dog (July 1966)
- Wake Up b/w She's in Love (January 1967)

=== The Cherry People 1967–1972 ===
Albums and singles

- The Cherry People (1968)
- And Suddenly b/w Imagination (1968)
- I'm The One Who Loves You b/w Gotta Get Back (To the Good Life) (1968)
- Sea and Me b/w Come on Over (1972)

=== BUX 1972–1974 ===
- We Come to Play (Recorded in 1974, Released in 1976)

=== Angel 1975–present ===
- Angel (1975)
- Helluva Band (1976)
- On Earth as It Is in Heaven (1977)
- White Hot (1978)
- Sinful (1979)
- Live Without a Net (1980)
- An Anthology (1992)
- In the Beginning (1999), plays lead guitar on "Hero" and "Set Me Free"
- Angel: The Collection (2000)
- Angel: The Singles Collection Volume 1 (2006)
- Angel: The Singles Collection Volume 2 (2006)
- Angel: Risen (2019)
- Angel: Once Upon a Time (2023)

=== Punky Meadows ===
- Fallen Angel (2016)
