= BUX (band) =

American rock band

- Also known as: Daddy Warbux (1967–1972)
- Origin: Washington, D.C., U.S.
- Genres: Hard rock, boogie rock
- Years active: 1967–1974
- Label: Capitol
- Past members: James Newlon; Jerry Stroup; Tommy Bonarrigo; Sheba Coates; Bob Leger; Wiley Crawford; Punky Meadows; Ralph Morman; Mickie Jones; Rocky Isaac

BUX was an American hard rock/boogie rock band that is best known for having lead guitarist Punky Meadows and bassist Mickie Jones both of whom joined Angel, and lead singer Ralph Morman who was with the Joe Perry Project from 1979–1980 and Savoy Brown from 1980–1982.

== Origins ==
James Newlon formed Daddy Warbux, a Cape Cod-based outfit in 1967. Under this guise the band consisted of vocalist Sheba Coates, Newlon (known as 'The Wheel'), bassist Jerry Stroup and ex-Fate drummer Tommy Bonarrigo. Coates departed in 1972 for a covers act Cortege and former Richie & the Renegades man Bob Leger filled the position. As Daddy Warbux, the band toured America supporting Brits Humble Pie. A later addition to the line up was keyboard player/vocalist Wiley Crawford. Re-billed as BUX the band was signed to Frank Connolly, then Aerosmith manager.

== BUX ==
BUX was a hard rock band composed of guitarist James Newlon, guitarist Punky Meadows, lead singer Ralph Morman, bassist Mickie Jones, and drummer Rocky Isaac. In April 1973, Capitol Records signed the band and rushed them into the studio to record their debut album. Within five months the album was complete, but Capitol chose not to release the recordings because the band split up due to inner-conflicts, therefore unable to tour in support of the album. Meadows and Jones left to form Angel and their debut was released the following year. A few months later the group reformed and once again continued performing the nightclub circuits on the east coast. By late 1975, Angel was in full swing and enjoying national exposure. Capitol, sensing an opportunity to cash in on the band's success in relation to Meadows and Jones being former Bux members, issued the album they had canned two years prior, releasing it in February 1976 under the title "We Come To Play". Though some ardent Angel fans snapped them up eagerly, sales were slow, which has in retrospect been blamed on the record company's mishandling of promotion by not releasing an official single. Lead Vocalist Ralph Morman went on to sing for Joe Perry's first solo album Let the Music Do the Talking, and recorded two albums as lead singer for Savoy Brown in the early 1980s, including that band's highest-charting American single, "Run to Me," in 1981.

Bassist Mickie Jones died in San Dimas, California on September 5, 2009, after a long battle with liver cancer. Jones performed on four Angel albums (Angel, Helluva Band, On Earth As It Is In Heaven, and An Anthology). He toured extensively with the band in the United States for several years. Both Jones and Meadows were asked to join the New York Dolls but declined. After leaving Angel he formed the LA band Empire and was the lead singer. Empire included drummer Steve Riley (LA Guns). Over the years he became interested in film production and would later work in the film industry. Meadows lives in North Carolina as of 2013.

Future Foghat guitarist Erik Cartwright joined the band in early 1974 after Meadows and Jones left. Cartwright is pictured on both the front and back covers of the group's album release, although he did not actually perform on any of the songs, nor is his name listed as one of the players. Jack Douglas produced the Bux album. In recent years, "We Come To Play" has become a highly sought-after item for vinyl collectors, and it has thus far not been reissued on CD.

== Members ==
Daddy Warbux

- James Newlon – guitars (1967–1972)
- Jerry Stroup – bass (1967–1972)
- Tommy Bonarrigo – drums (1967–1972)
- Sheba Coates – vocals (1967–1972)
- Bob Leger – vocals (1972)
- Wiley Crawford – keyboards, vocals (1972)

BUX

- James Newlon – guitars, vocals (1972–1974)
- Punky Meadows – guitars (1972–1974)
- Ralph Morman – vocals (1972–1974)
- Mickie Jones – bass (1972–1974)
- Rocky Isaac – drums (1972–1974)
- Erik Cartwright – guitars (1974)

== Discography ==
- We Come to Play (recorded in 1973, released in 1976)
