= Bermuda Triangle Band =

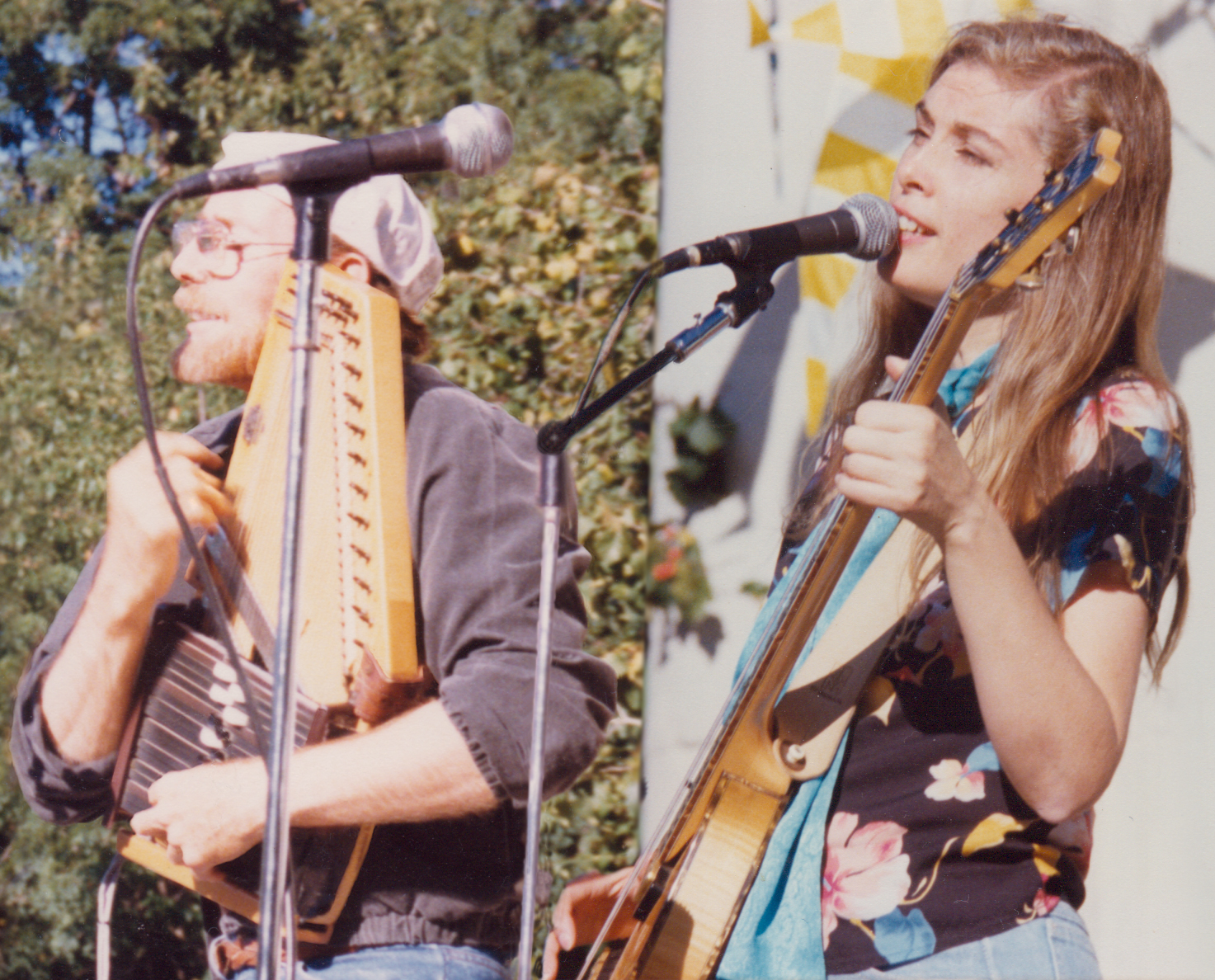
- Roger and Wendy of Bermuda Triangle at the New York Folk Festival, Central Park bandshell 1986

Background information
- Also known as: Roger Becket, Wendy Becket
- Origin: Greenwich Village, New York, United States
- Genres: Psychedelic rock, psychedelic folk, pop rock, folk, folk rock, pop music, country pop
- Years active: 1967-present
- Labels: MGM, Heritage, Polydor, Winter Solstice, Acme, Anazitisi
- Members: Roger Penney; Wendy Penney

Bermuda Triangle Band is a psychedelic rock band. The band's music features the autoharp and grew out of the late 1960s folk rock scene. Psychedelic rock autoharp was then unknown, and at the time there were very few women playing bass guitar. Since the formation of the band in 1967, its only constant members have been Roger Penney and Wendy Penney.

== History ==
=== Roger and Wendy ===
Roger and Wendy started as actors in the Boston Theater Company. The band, originally called Roger and Wendy, was formed in the late 1960s in Greenwich Village, typically playing in pass-the-basket-for-tips coffeehouses and folk clubs, such as Gerde's Folk City, (where they headlined for 33 weeks in one year, 1970, setting a club record); the Cafe Wha?, the Bitter End, the Cafe Au Go Go, The Gaslight Cafe, The Freudian Slip, The Basement Cafe, and Kenny's Castaways. Performing at first without microphones (as basket houses had no cabaret licenses, thus amplified vocals were illegal), they developed an energized psychedelic folk style with an electrified autoharp and fast-pulse bass guitar. Their music quickly evolved from traditional ballads to folk rock, including psychedelic folk, acid freak folk and rock.

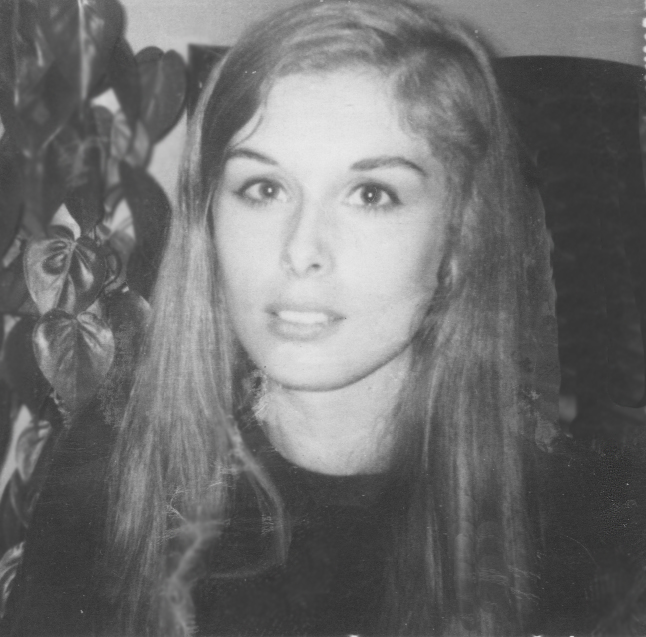
Wendy Penney with the Theatre Company of Boston

Roger and Wendy took the stage names Roger Becket and Wendy Becket when they became involved with the Theatre Company of Boston; they kept these pseudonyms through much of their musical career before returning to their original surname of Penney, which accounts for some confusion regarding credit for albums.

=== Euphoria ===
For a one-year interlude in 1969, Roger and Wendy fronted a band with Tom Pacheco and Sharon Alexander called Euphoria. Roger and Wendy were the lead vocalists. The group signed with MGM/Heritage Records, and with Jerry Ross producing, released an album titled EUPHORIA (with an American sunshine pop style à la The Mamas and the Papas), and a single titled "You Must Forget". They then disbanded.

Their album was reissued in March 2007 by Beatball Records.

== Bermuda Triangle ==
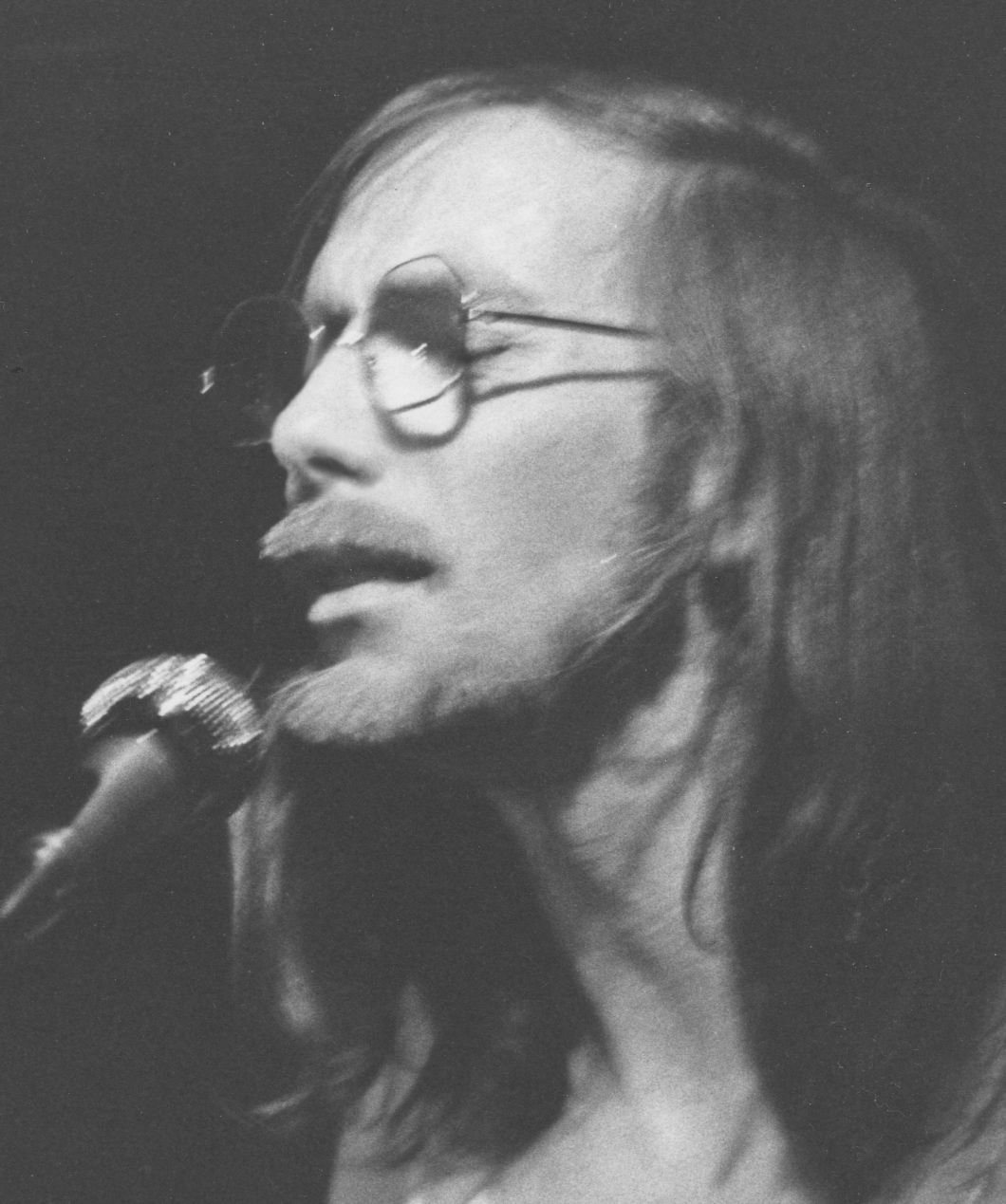
Roger Penney in the 1970s

The college concert circuit courted Roger and Wendy and booked several long national tours, an arrangement that continued through more than 3000 concerts. Using Woodstock, New York, as a temporary songwriting base in 1972, the band generated the folk album Roger and Wendy. A female drummer/fiddler, known only as Sam, then joined the group. In 1975 the band changed its name to Bermuda Triangle and released its psychedelic folk album Bermuda Triangle in 1977. Roger had been writing the bulk of the group's songs.

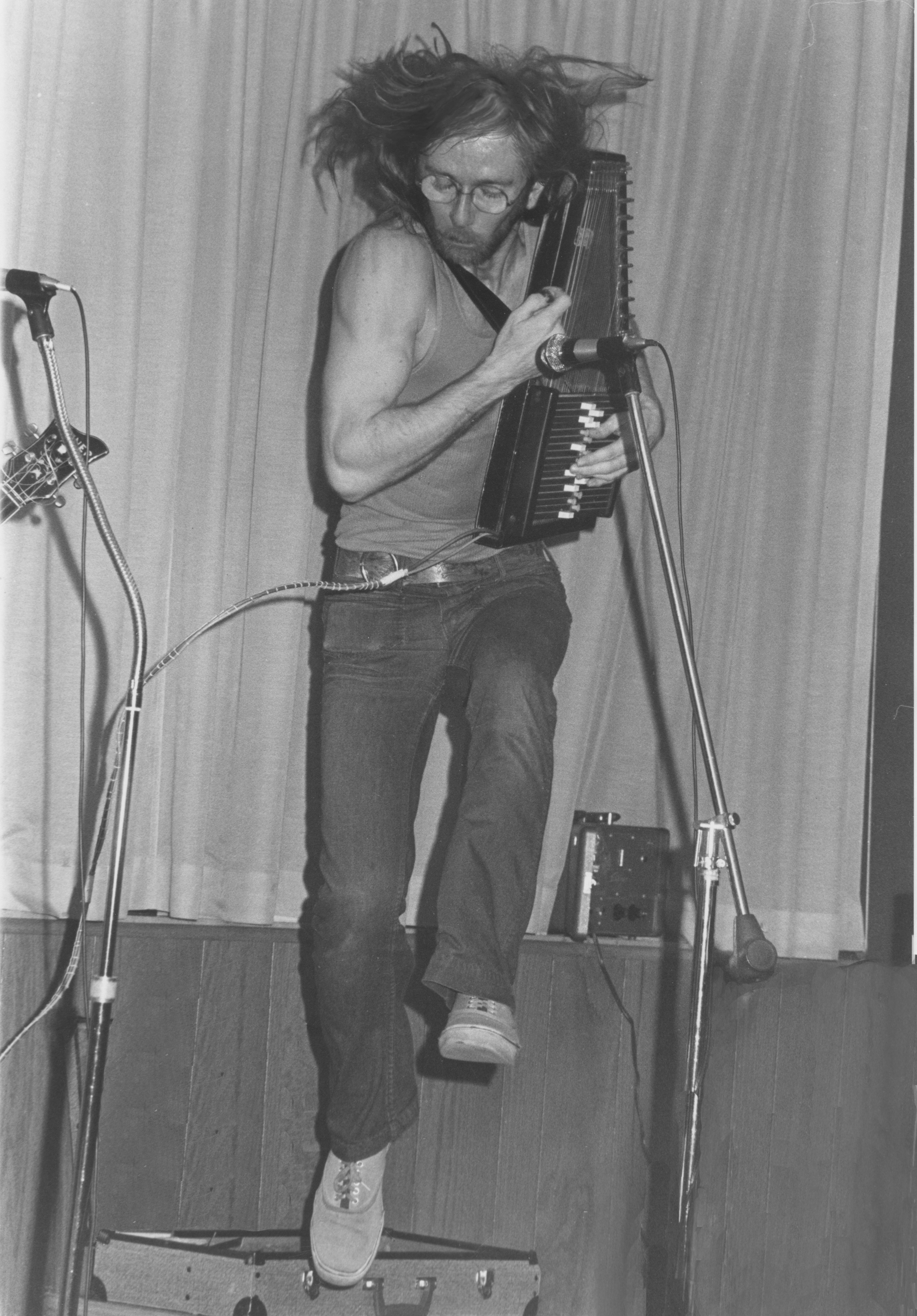
Roger Penney in concert at St Bonaventure Univ.

National tours and New York City concerts continued at full capacity. 1984 saw the Bermuda's II vinyl pressed.

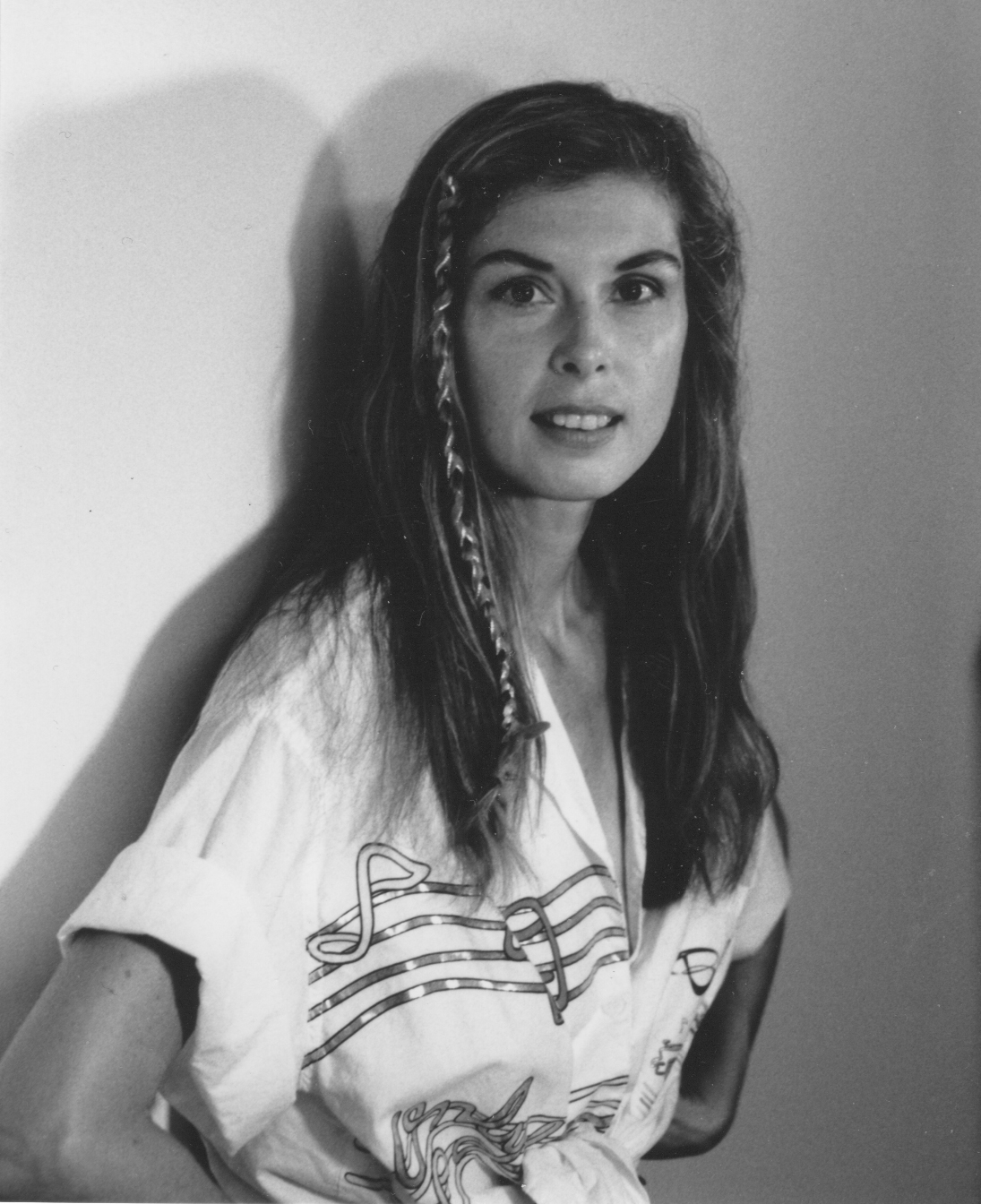
Wendy Penney circa 1993

Bermuda Triangle continued their heavy touring schedule until 1993. In 2006 they released the R & W Penney CD, a digression into country cajun. Then, in January 2007, they reissued the 1977 Bermuda Triangle LP as a CD after remixing, and adding more autoharp tracks and an additional song. In Spring 2007 they released The Missing Tapes on Winter Solstice Records. It is a psychedelic folk CD featuring works spanning their entire career. Most of the songs have never been released before, and some have never been performed.

== Autoharp ==
Roger Penney, the originator of rock autoharp, redesigned the autoharp's chord bar structure and gave the design to The Oscar Schmidt Company, the largest American crafter of autoharps. Since then, all major autoharp manufacturers worldwide have switched to making autoharps using Roger's design. He used contact mics and magnetic pickups to create a true 'electric autoharp', and invented a braille-type system of round and rectangular chord bar buttons (which allowed the player to know by touch exactly what chord they were playing without visual observance). This made it possible to play complex chord patterns on a chromatically tuned autoharp in multiple keys. His sound is shaped with various effects, including wah-wah, phasing, flanging, fuzz, delay, octave and modulation. He then developed a method of triggering live percussion simultaneously with the autoharp, utilizing technology incorporated into the harp's structure.

He was also instrumental in the design and development of the first electromechanical harpsichord, which came to be known as the 'Baldwin Combo Harpsichord' (see electric piano). It was originally conceived and built in the mid-1960s at Cannon Guild, a premier harpsichord maker in Cambridge, Massachusetts. It had contact pickups, an aluminum frame, a spruce soundboard, and a clear plastic lid. Modifications were made later by the Baldwin Piano Company, who bought the design and prototypes that were made at Cannon Guild.

== Discography ==
- Euphoria (Euphoria) MGM/Heritage Records (1969)
- Euphoria (Euphoria) Polydor Records single No. 59368
- Roger and Wendy (Roger and Wendy) Horny Records (1971)
- Bermuda Triangle (Bermuda Triangle) LP on Winter Solstice Records (1977)
- Bermuda's II (Bermuda Triangle) Tribecket Records (1984)
- Bermuda Triangle (Bermuda Triangle) Reissued on Radioactive Records UK (2006)
- One Day At A Time (R & W Penney) Winter Solstice Records (2006)
- Bermuda Triangle (Bermuda Triangle) CD on Winter Solstice Records (2007)
- Euphoria (Euphoria) Reissued on Heritage/Beatball Records (2007)
- The Missing Tapes (Bermuda Triangle) Winter Solstice Records (2007)
- "Bermuda Triangle" (Bermuda Triangle) Reissued 12 inch vinyl LP on Anazitisi Records (2008)
- "Roger and Wendy" (Love Rog and Wem) Reissued 12 inch vinyl LP on Acme Records UK (2009)
- "The Missing Tapes"(Bermuda Triangle) vinyl LP on Anazitisi Records (2009)
- "Roger and Wendy" (Love Rog and Wem) Reissued CD on Lion Productions (2010)
