= Chicken soup (disambiguation) =

Chicken soup is a soup made from chicken.

Chicken soup may also refer to:

- Chicken Soup (TV series), 1989 American series
- "Chicken Soup", a 1976 song by Angel from Helluva Band
- "Chicken Soup", a 1993 song by Saint Etienne from So Tough

== See also ==
- "The Ballad of Chicken Soup", a 1975 song by Carole King from Really Rosie musical soundtrack
- Chicken Soup for the Soul, LLC, an American self-help and consumer goods company, known for its book series
- 1979 Cotton Bowl Classic, known as the Chicken Soup Game
