= Wendy Penney =

American singer and bass guitar player

Wendy Ellen Penney
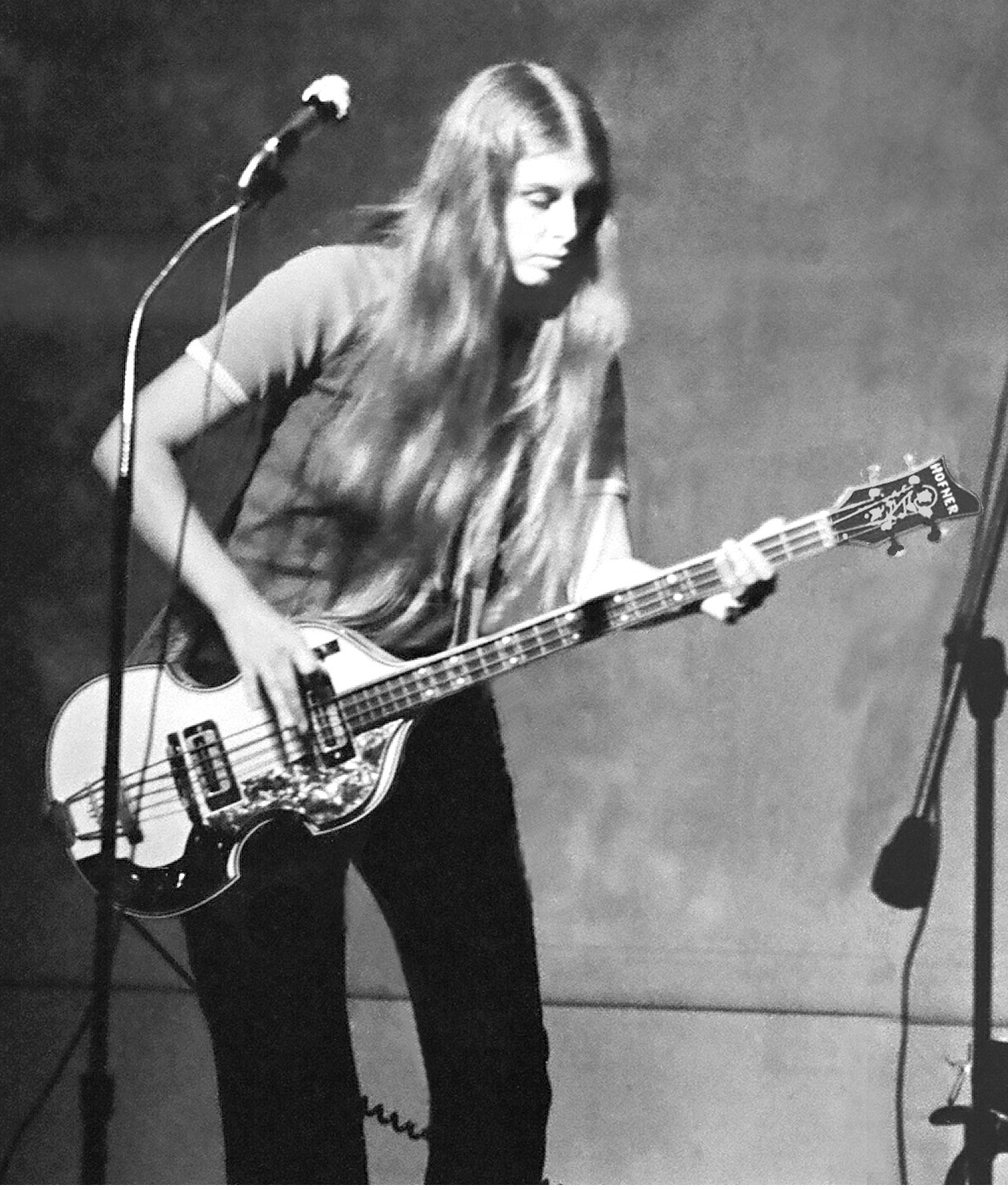
- Penney in 1970 performance

Background information
- Also known as: Wendy Becket
- Born: 1940 or 1941 (age 84–85)
- Origin: Greenwich Village, New York City, New York, US
- Genres: Psychedelic folk, folk rock, Americana, psychedelic rock, freak folk
- Occupations: Singer, instrumentalist, songwriter
- Instruments: Vocal, bass guitar
- Years active: 1967–present
- Labels: MGM, Heritage, Winter Solstice, Anazitisi, Acme, Lion

Wendy Penney (born c. 1940) is a singer and bass guitar player who began performing in 1966, and together with husband Roger Penney formed the musical groups Bermuda Triangle Band, Roger and Wendy, and Euphoria.

== History ==
Penney started playing bass guitar in 1967 at a time when women bass players were a rarity. In October 1969, Variety wrote: "Wendy is one of the very few women who can really play electric bass." Penney also became known for her vocal ability. In 1981, Entertainment New York magazine wrote, "Wendy, ethereal and beautiful bass guitarist, mesmerizes with a crystal clear soprano that's got to be one of the best in the business."

Penney has been a member of three bands: Roger and Wendy (1967–), Euphoria (1969–1970), and Bermuda Triangle Band (1975–). She has done extensive concert tours throughout the United States and Canada. In 1969 Wendy Penney formed the group Euphoria with Roger Penney, Tom Pacheco and Sharon Alexander, They recorded the album entitled Euphoria for MGM/Heritage Records. Wendy Penny wrote all the music for a 10-part series Inside The Bermuda Triangle on BBC Radio 4 which was broadcast September 14–25, 2009. The series was produced by Adam Fowler and featured Tom Mangold. In recognition of her oil paintings, Penney was made a lifetime member of the Art Students League of New York.

== Discography ==
- "Euphoria" (Euphoria) MGM/Heritage Records (1969)
- "Euphoria" (Euphoria) Polydor Records single #59368
- "Love Rog and Wem" (Roger and Wendy) Horny Records 1971
- "Bermuda Triangle" (Bermuda Triangle) Winter Solstice Records 1977
- "Bermuda's II" (Bermuda Triangle) Tribecket Records 1984
- "Bermuda Triangle" (Bermuda Triangle). Reissued on Radioactive Records UK 2006
- "One Day at a Time" (R&W PENNEY) Winter Solstice Records 2006
- "Bermuda Triangle" (Bermuda Triangle). Reissued CD Winter Solstice Records 2007
- "Euphoria" (Euphoria). Reissued CD Heritage Records 2006
- "The Missing Tapes" (Bermuda Triangle) Winter Solstice Records 2007
- "Bermuda Triangle" (Bermuda Triangle). Reissued 12" vinyl Anazitisi Records 2008
- "Love Rog and Wem" (Roger and Wendy) 12" vinyl Acme Records UK 2009
- "The Missing Tapes" (Bermuda Triangle) 12" vinyl Anazitisi Records 2009
- "Roger and Wendy" (Love Rog and Wem). Reissued CD on Lion Productions 2010
