= Euphoria (American band) =

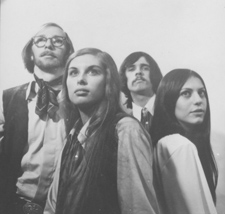
- L to R: Roger Penney, Wendy Penney, Tom Pacheco, Sharon Alexander

Background information
- Also known as: Roger Becket, Wendy Becket
- Origin: New York, New York, United States
- Genres: Folk rock, pop rock, sunshine pop
- Years active: 1968–1969
- Labels: MGM; Heritage Records; Heritage/Beatball; Polydor
- Spinoffs: Bermuda Triangle Band
- Spinoff of: Roger and Wendy
- Past members: Roger Penney; Wendy Penney; Tom Pacheco; Sharon Alexander

Euphoria was a short-lived band from 1968 to 1969, consisting of Roger Penney on electric autoharp, Wendy Penney on Bass guitar, Tom Pacheco on Acoustic Guitar, and Sharon Alexander. Roger and Wendy were a folk duo performing in Greenwich Village, using the names Roger Becket and Wendy Becket. Euphoria is generally regarded as a sunshine pop group.

== History ==
Initially, Roger and Wendy were approached by Tom and Sharon to form a band with the express purpose of procuring a recording deal. Roger and Wendy were to front the band as lead vocalists in the folk rock group, with Roger Penney on electric autoharp and keyboards, Wendy on bass guitar, Tom on guitar, and Sharon on percussion. They signed with Jerry Ross's Heritage Records, which was affiliated with MGM as distributor and promoter, and recorded one album entitled Euphoria. in Sunshine Pop music style, not unlike other music groups such as The Mamas And The Papas or Spanky And Our Gang did in those days. Arranged by Joe Renzetti it was released in 1969, but without promotional support. A single You Must Forget was released, with Roger singing lead. Another single Calm Down was also released on Polydor Records.

The album and the group's live performances were subjects of printed articles in Record World magazine, Go magazine, Cashbox Magazine, and Variety. Euphoria performed live with musician Van Morrison and the 1910 Fruitgum Company at Madison Square Garden's Felt Forum as well as with Sly and the Family Stone and Iron Butterfly. They appeared on the Bozo the Clown television show at WWOR-TV from New York City, and were slated for a performance on The Tonight Show Starring Johnny Carson but disbanded before appearing. Roger and Wendy went on to form the Bermuda Triangle Band. Tom Pacheco and Sharon Alexander continued their collaboration, releasing one album called Pacheco & Alexander in 1971. The album featured a folk/country sound and several prominent musicians including Denny Seiwell, John Hall, Richard Bell and Harvey Brooks. Pacheco later co-wrote All Fly Away with Paul Kantner for Jefferson Starship's first album Dragon Fly in 1974. The album has been reissued as a CD and a mini LP on the Heritage/Beatball label.

== Discography ==
- Euphoria Heritage/MGM Records (1969)
- Euphoria reissue Heritage/Beatball Records (2007)
- Euphoria Single on Polydor Records No. 59368
- "Euphoria" (You Must Forget) single on Heritage/MGM Records
