= Bryan Bowers =

American autoharp player

Bryan Bowers is an American autoharp player who is frequently credited with introducing the instrument to new generations of musicians.

== Career ==
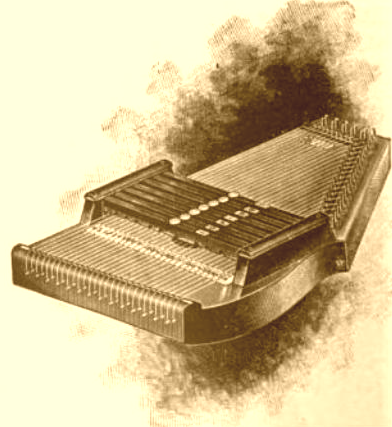
Bowers is known for performing on the autoharp.

Bowers became very popular with the audience of the comedy radio program The Dr. Demento Show with his 1980 recording of Mike Cross's song "The Scotsman". In 1993, Bowers was inducted into the Autoharp Hall of Fame whose membership includes Mother Maybelle Carter, Kilby Snow, and Sara Carter.

In two consecutive years, 2006 and 2007, he released new recordings: Bristlecone Pine and September in Alaska. "Although such guests as Tim O'Brien, Sam Bush, Stuart Duncan, and Enright and O'Bryant play and sing on a number of cuts, this is a Bryan Bowers disc all the way, with his exquisite autoharp flavoring many of the tunes," wrote a November 2006 Bluegrass Unlimited reviewer of Bristlecone Pine. "Bowers selects thematically diverse and lyrically strong material. There are powerful love songs ("When You And I Were True" and "Magnolia") and non-cloying meditations on life and death ("Bristlecone Pine," "Friend For Life," and "When I Go"), as well as haunting instrumentals. He nicely avoids the hackneyed stuff of so many folk/bluegrass/country performers." He maintains an active performance and teaching schedule.

== Awards ==
- Contemporary Inductee, Autoharp Hall of Fame, 1993.
- Lifetime Achievement Award, California Autoharp Gathering, 2006.
- Induction into Frets Magazine's First Gallery of the Greats

== Select discography ==
- The View from Home, Flying Fish, 1977
- Home, Home on the Road, Flying Fish, 1980
- By Heart, Flying Fish, 1982
- For You, Flying Fish, 1990
- Friend for Life, Flying Fish, 2002
- Bristlecone Pine, Seattle Sounds, 2006
- September in Alaska, Seattle Sounds, 2007
- Crabby Old Man, 2011
- Live at Winterfolk, 2015
- Woodland Dream, 2019
