= White Hot (album) =

Studio album by Angel
- Released: January 1978
- Recorded: 1977
- Genre: Hard rock
- Length: 37:37
- Labels: Casablanca; Mercury
- Producer: Eddie Leonetti

Angel chronology
| On Earth as It Is in Heaven (1977) | White Hot (1978) | Sinful (1979) |

White Hot is the fourth album by the rock band Angel. After the release of On Earth as It Is in Heaven, bass guitar player Mickie Jones left and was replaced by Felix Robinson.

The album contains Angel's only top 50 hit, "Ain't Gonna Eat Out My Heart Anymore," originally recorded by the Young Rascals in 1965, which went to No. 44 on the Billboard Hot 100 in 1978. The single spent eight weeks on the Billboard Hot 100. The album peaked at No. 55 on the Billboard Top 200.

== Cover art ==
The cathedral in the background is inspired by Notre Dame de Paris. The cover concept is by David Joseph & Chris Whorf, according to inner sleeve credits.

== Critical reception ==
Professional ratings
Review scores
| Source | Rating |
|---|---|
| AllMusic | 2/5 stars |
| The Encyclopedia of Popular Music | 3/5 stars |
| The New Rolling Stone Record Guide | 0/5 stars |

The Spokane Daily Chronicle deemed the album "hard rock, sort of bubble-gum Led Zeppelin."

The New Rolling Stone Record Guide gave the album 0 stars, a rating reserved for "worthless" records.

== Track listing ==
1. "Don't Leave Me Lonely" (Barry Brandt, Frank DiMino) – 4:00
2. "Ain't Gonna Eat Out My Heart Anymore" (Lori Burton, Pam Sawyer) – 2:50
3. "Hold Me, Squeeze Me" (Frank DiMino, Gregg Giuffria, Punky Meadows) – 3:49
4. "Over and Over" (Frank DiMino, Gregg Giuffria, Punky Meadows) – 3:01
5. "Under Suspicion" (Barry Brandt, Frank DiMino, Gregg Giuffria, Punky Meadows) – 4:42
6. "Got Love If You Want It" (Frank DiMino, Gregg Giuffria, Punky Meadows) – 4:28
7. "Stick Like Glue" (Frank DiMino, Gregg Giuffria, Punky Meadows) – 2:38
8. "Flying with Broken Wings (Without You)" (Frank DiMino, Gregg Giuffria, Punky Meadows) – 3:32
9. "You Could Lose Me" (Frank DiMino, Gregg Giuffria, Punky Meadows) – 4:53
10. "The Winter Song" (Frank DiMino, Gregg Giuffria, Punky Meadows) – 3:44
11. "Better Days" (Bonus Track on the 2019 edition)

== Singles ==
| Year | Single | Chart | Position |
|---|---|---|---|
| 1978 | "Ain't Gonna Eat Out My Heart Anymore" | Billboard Hot 100 | 44 |

== Personnel ==
- Frank DiMino – lead and backing vocals
- Punky Meadows – electric and acoustic guitars
- Gregg Giuffria – keyboards, Moog, IIIC synthesizer
- Felix Robinson – bass, backing vocals, six-string bass
- Barry Brandt – drums, backing vocals, percussion, electronic drums
