= Pianist =

Musician who plays the piano

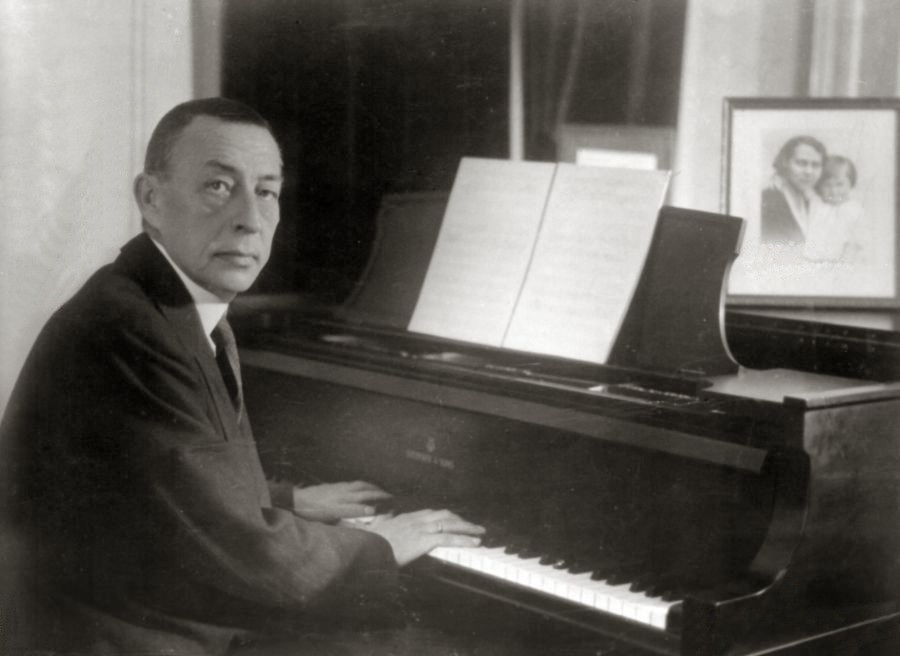
Sergei Rachmaninoff at the piano

Motion capture of two pianists' fingers playing the same piece (slow motion, no sound).

'Humoresque' by Sergei Rachmaninoff

A pianist (US: /piːˈænɪst/ pee-AN-ist, also /ˈpiːənɪst/ PEE-ə-nist) is a musician who plays the piano. A pianist's repertoire may include music from a diverse variety of styles, such as traditional classical music, jazz, blues, and popular music, including rock and roll. Most pianists can, to an extent, easily play other keyboard instruments such as the synthesizer, harpsichord, celesta, and the organ.

== Pianists past and present ==
Contemporary classical pianists focus on dedicating their careers to performing, recording, teaching, researching, and continually adding new compositions to their repertoire. In contrast to their 19th-century counterparts, they typically do not engage in the composition or transcription of music. While some classical pianists may specialize in accompaniment and chamber music, a smaller number opt for full-time solo careers.

== Classical ==
Gaspard de la nuit by Maurice Ravel is considered a highly technically challenging piano piece.

Mozart could be considered the first concert pianist, as he performed widely on the piano. Composers Beethoven and Clementi from the Classical era were also famed for their playing, as were, from the Romantic era, Liszt, Brahms, Chopin, Mendelssohn, Rachmaninoff, and Schumann. The Romantic era also saw the emergence of pianists better known for their performances than for composing, such as Clara Schumann and Hans von Bülow.

== Jazz ==
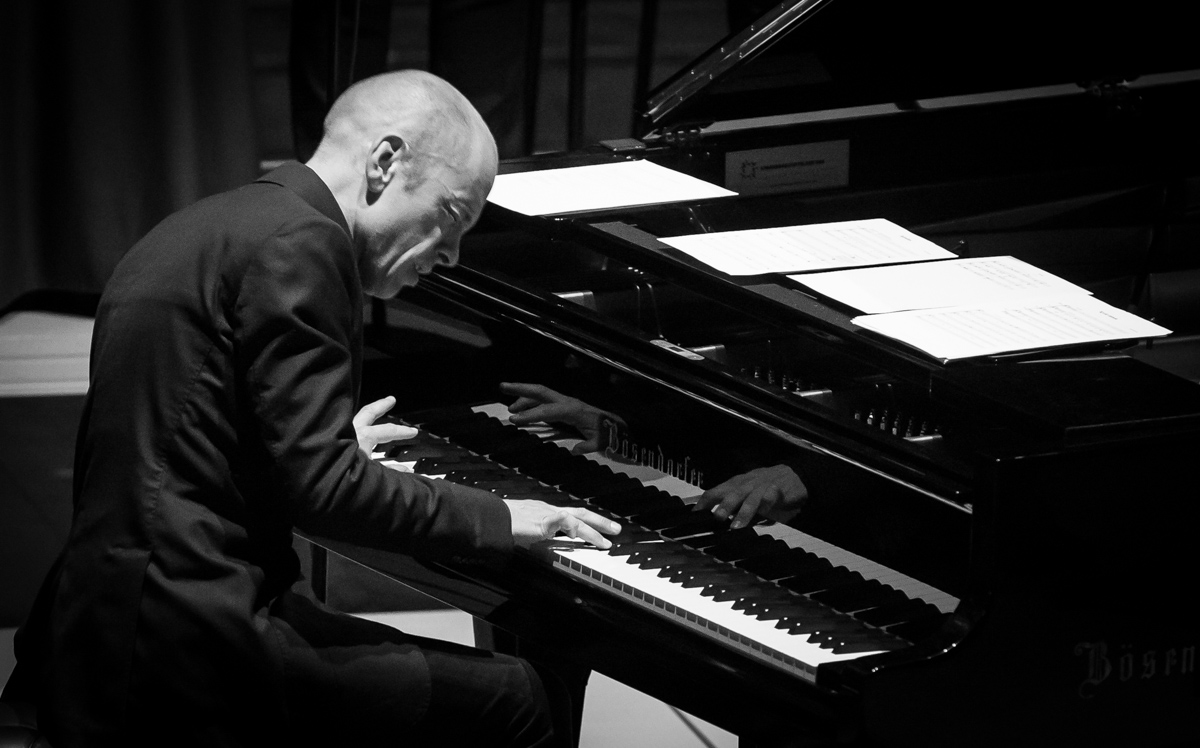
Tord Gustavsen playing piano during a concert at the 2016 Oslo Jazz Festival in Norway

Jazz pianists almost always perform with other musicians. Their playing is more free than that of classical pianists, and they create an air of spontaneity in their performances. They generally do not write down their compositions; improvisation is a significant part of their work. Well known jazz pianists include Bill Evans, Art Tatum, Duke Ellington, Thelonious Monk, Oscar Peterson, Bud Powell, McCoy Tyner, Chick Corea, Herbie Hancock, and Brad Mehldau.

== Pop and rock ==
Popular pianists might work as live performers (concert, theatre, etc.) or session musicians. Arrangers most likely feel at home with synthesizers and other electronic keyboard instruments. Notable popular pianists include Liberace, who at the height of his fame was one of the highest paid entertainers in the world, as well as Elton John and Billy Joel, so nicknamed "The Piano Man", others include Richard Clayderman, who is known for his covers of popular tunes and the late Victor Borge, who performed as a comedian.

== Pianists by genre ==
A single listing of pianists in all genres would be impractical, given the multitude of musicians noted for their performances on the instrument. Below are links to lists of well-known or influential pianists divided by genres:

=== Classical pianists ===
- List of classical pianists (recorded)
- List of classical pianists
- List of classical piano duos (performers)

=== Jazz pianists ===
- List of jazz pianists

=== Pop and rock music pianists ===
- List of pop and rock pianists

=== Blues pianists ===
- List of blues musicians
- List of boogie woogie musicians

=== Gospel pianists ===
- List of gospel musicians

=== New-age pianists ===
- List of new-age music artists

== Pianist-composers ==
Many important composers were also virtuoso pianists. The following is an incomplete list of such musicians.

=== Classical period (1730–1820) ===
- Muzio Clementi
- Jan Ladislav Dussek
- Wolfgang Amadeus Mozart
- Ludwig van Beethoven
- Johann Nepomuk Hummel
- Carl Maria von Weber

=== Romantic period (1800–1910) ===
- Felix Mendelssohn
- Frédéric Chopin
- Robert Schumann
- Franz Liszt
- Clara Schumann
- Charles-Valentin Alkan
- Anton Rubinstein
- Johannes Brahms
- Camille Saint-Saëns
- Edvard Grieg
- Isaac Albéniz
- Edward MacDowell
- Anton Arensky
- Alexander Scriabin
- Sergei Rachmaninoff
- Nikolai Medtner

=== Modern period ===
- Claude Debussy
- Ferruccio Busoni
- Maurice Ravel
- Béla Bartók
- Sergei Prokofiev
- George Gershwin
- Dmitri Shostakovich
- Alberto Ginastera
- Vladimir Horowitz

=== Contemporary period ===
- Cory Henry
- Jacob Collier
- Jon Batiste
- Tigran Hamasyan
- Ananda Sukarlan

== Amateur pianism ==
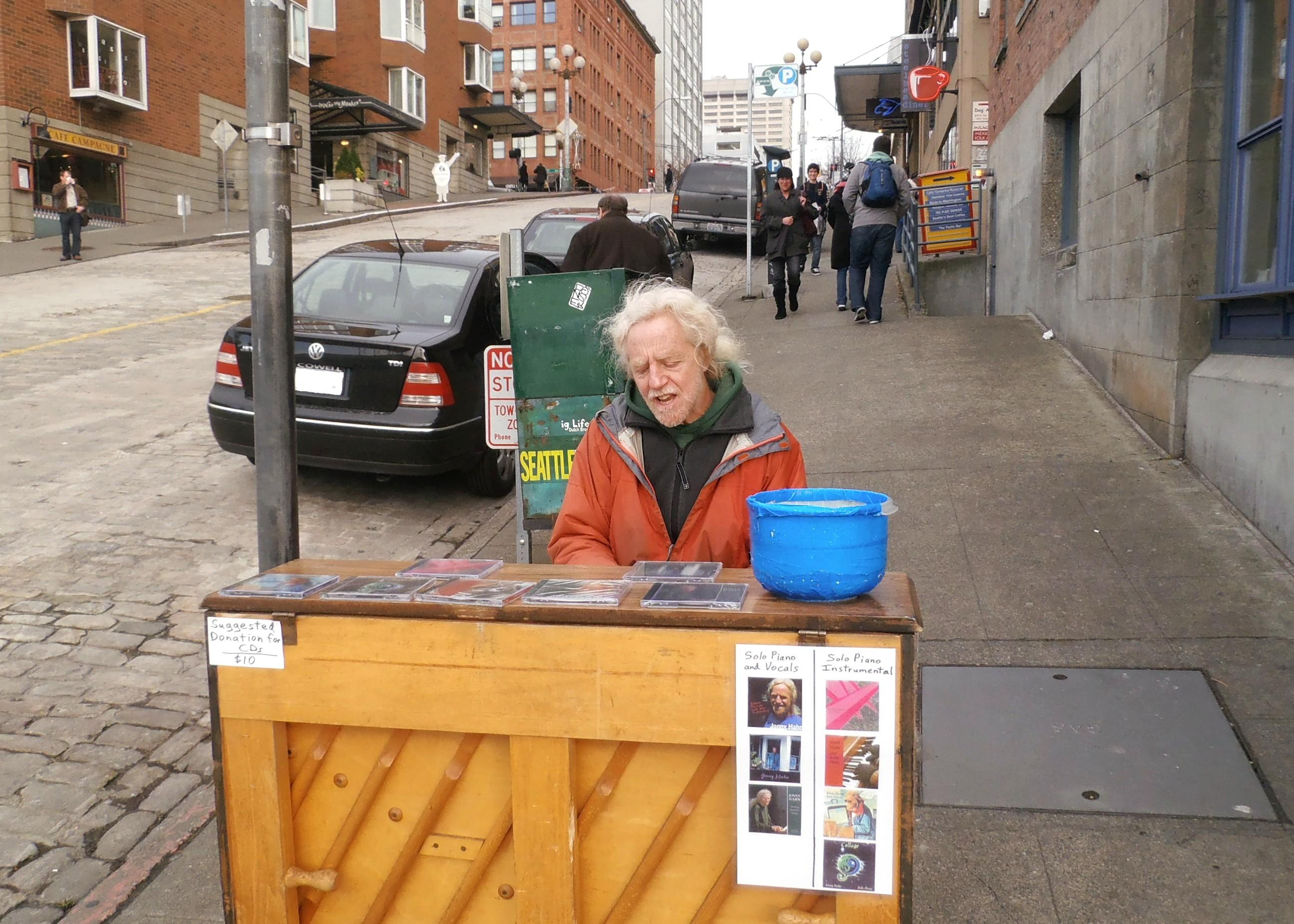
An amateur pianist playing outdoors at Pike Place market in Seattle.

Some people, despite having received extensive piano training in their youth, decide not to continue their musical careers but choose nonmusical ones. As a result, there are prominent communities of amateur pianists all over the world, many of whom still play at a high level and give concerts, regardless of potential financial gain. The International Piano Competition for Outstanding Amateurs, held annually in Paris, attracts about one thousand listeners each year and is broadcast on French radio.

Jon Nakamatsu, the Gold Medal winner of the Van Cliburn International Piano Competition for professional pianists in Fort Worth, Texas (1997) was at the moment of his victory technically an amateur: he never attended a music conservatory or majored in music, and worked as a high school German teacher at the time; it was only after the competition that he started pursuing a career as a classical pianist.

The German pianist Davide Martello is known for traveling around conflict zones to play his moving piano. Martello has previously been recognized by the European Parliament for his "outstanding contribution to European cooperation and the promotion of common values".

== See also ==
- List of films about pianists
- List of University and College Schools of Music
- List of Piano Brand Names
