= Live Without a Net =

Live Without a Net may refer to:

- Live Without a Net (album), a 1980 live album by the rock band Angel
- Live Without a Net (Van Halen video), a 1986 video of a live Van Halen performance
- Live Without a Net (book), a 2005 science fiction anthology edited by Lou Anders
