= On Earth as It Is in Heaven =

Studio album by Angel
- Released: February 1977
- Genre: Hard rock
- Length: 42:10
- Label: Casablanca, Mercury; Lovember Records (limited edition remaster)
- Producer: Eddie Kramer

Angel chronology
Helluva Band (1976)	On Earth as It Is in Heaven (1977)	White Hot (1978)

Professional ratings
Review scores
Source	Rating
Allmusic	link
Melodic.net	link

On Earth as It Is in Heaven is the third album by the rock band Angel. It is the last album with Mickie Jones who had been the band's bassist since its formation. It was produced by Eddie Kramer and recorded in an actual castle in the Hollywood Hills. "Cast the First Stone" and "Just A Dream" are very similar in sound to the songs on Angel and Helluva Band. In fact, "Cast The First Stone" was written during the Helluva Band sessions. The band toured non-stop and it was during this time they took on their only tour of Japan. The album peaked at #76 on the US Billboard charts.

Lovember Records reissued On Earth... in a digitally remastered limited edition in August 2008. It included a 16-page booklet with liner notes by the journalist Dave Reynolds (Classic Rock magazine and Kerrang), a track-by-track run down by the singer Frank DiMino, all lyrics and previously unreleased photos. The LP originally contained a symmetrical poster of the album cover.

== Track listing ==
All songs written by Frank DiMino, Gregg Giuffria and Punky Meadows, except where noted.

1. "Can You Feel It" - 4:44
2. "She's a Mover" - 3:37
3. "Big Boy (Let's Do It Again)" - 3:44
4. "Telephone Exchange" - 4:12
5. "White Lightning" - 4:40 (Punky Meadows, R. Morman)
6. "On the Rocks" - 3:39
7. "You're Not Fooling Me" - 4:03
8. "That Magic Touch" - 3:38
9. "Cast the First Stone" - 4:38
10. "Just a Dream" - 5:15

== Personnel ==
=== Angel ===
- Frank DiMino: vocals
- Punky Meadows: acoustic and electric guitars
- Gregg Giuffria: keyboards
- Mickie Jones: bass guitar
- Barry Brandt: drums

=== Additional personnel ===
- Dan Wyman: synthesizer, programming

== Production ==
- Produced and engineered by Eddie Kramer
- Mix assistant: Corky Stasiak
- Technical assistance: Art Kelm, Richard Landers, Peter Oreckinto, Lon LeMaster
- Tape operator: Rick Smith
- Digital editing: John Kubick
- Mastering: George Marino
