= Sinful (album) =

Studio album by Angel
- Released: January 1979
- Recorded: 1978
- Genre: Hard rock
- Length: Originally 31:14 reissue 40:35
- Label: Casablanca, Mercury
- Producer: Eddie Leonetti

Angel chronology
White Hot (1978)	Sinful (1979)	Live Without a Net (1980)

Professional ratings
Review scores
Source	Rating
AllMusic	2/5 stars
The Encyclopedia of Popular Music	2/5 stars
The New Rolling Stone Record Guide	0/5 stars

Sinful is the fifth album by the rock band Angel. It was originally titled Bad Publicity and a few copies of the album with that name and a different album cover were sold before being replaced. The album went to No. 159 on the US Pop Album Charts in 1979. Some consider it their most pop-oriented album. The band supported the album by touring with Ted Nugent.

== Track listing ==
1. "Don't Take Your Love" (DiMino, Giuffria) – 3:30
2. "L.A. Lady" (Meadows) – 3:45
3. "Just Can't Take It" (DiMino, Meadows) – 3:44
4. "You Can't Buy Love" (Brandt, DiMino) – 3:37
5. "Bad Time" (DiMino, Giuffria) – 3:41
6. "Waited a Long Time" (Brandt, DiMino) – 3:13
7. "I'll Bring the Whole World to Your Door" (DiMino, Leonetti, Meadows) – 2:54
8. "I'll Never Fall in Love Again" (Giuffria) – 3:33
9. "Wild and Hot" (Meadows) – 2:59
10. "Lovers Live On" (Meadows, Robinson) – 2:58
11. "Virginia" (Meadows) – 3:58 (bonus track from the soundtrack to the motion picture Foxes)
12. "Walk Away Renee" (Sansome, Calilli, Brown) - 2:54 (bonus track)

== Personnel ==
- Frank DiMino – vocals
- Punky Meadows – guitars
- Felix Robinson – bass guitar
- Barry Brandt – drums
- Gregg Giuffria – keyboards
