= Autoharp =

Musical string instrument

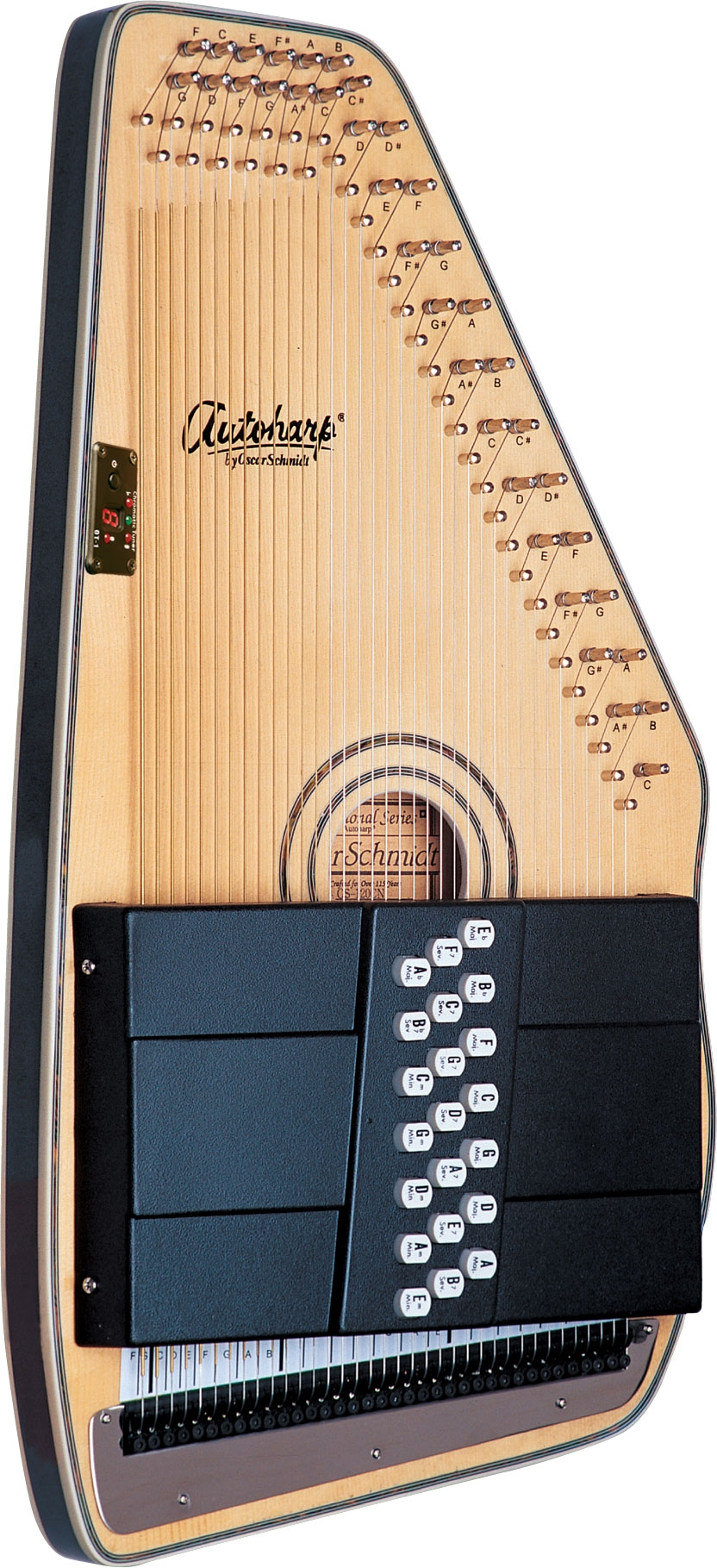
- Modern autoharp
- Classification: Box zither
- Inventor(s): Charles F. Zimmermann, Karl August Gütter

Related instruments
- Zither, marxophone, dolceola

An autoharp is a string instrument in the zither family. Its distinctive structural feature is a set of bars, each with damping pads that mute the strings not belonging to a specified chord. A chord is played by pressing the corresponding bar against the strings with one hand while strumming them with the other.

== History ==
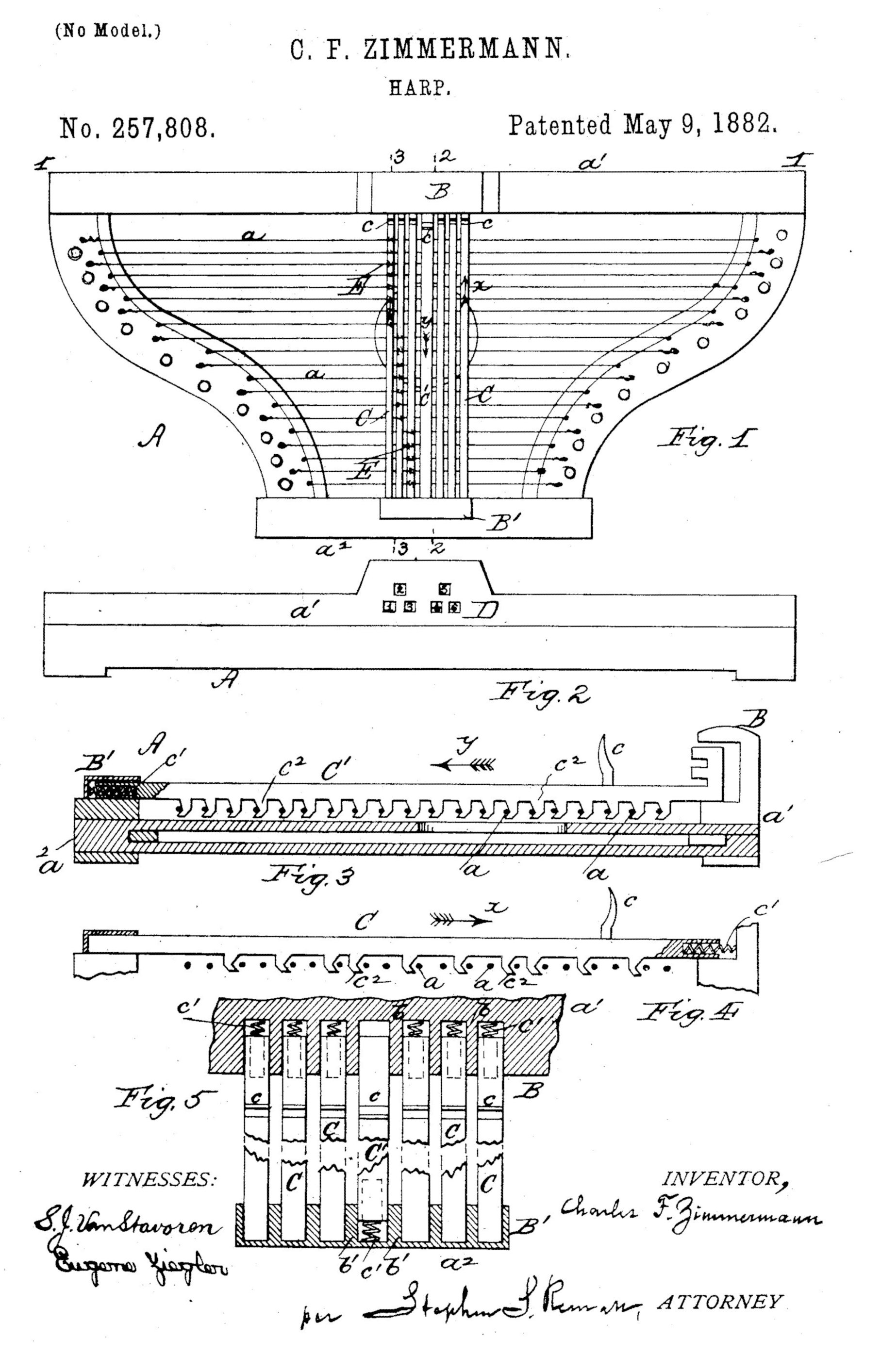
Charles F. Zimmermann's initial autoharp patent from 1881

The term autoharp first appeared in US Patent 257808 applied for by Charles F. Zimmermann on 10 December 1881, and issued on 9 May 1882. It was the earliest patent for any zither with a mechanized damping device for the production of chords. The instrument drawn in the patent was trapezoidal, and the damping mechanism engaged with the strings laterally. Zimmermann incorporated perpendicularly-operated bars in two more elaborate models, of which one was exhibited at the 1884–1885 World Cotton Centennial. It was awarded a "Certificate of First Degree of Merit".

On 20 May 1884, Hermann Lindemann and Karl August Gütter applied for German Patent 29930 for a "Device for damping individual strings on string instruments" (Einrichtung zum Dämpfen einzelner Saiten bei Saiteninstrumente). It was issued on January 5, 1885, and claimed chord bars with the same effect as Zimmermann's but a different mechanical implementation. The profile of the instrument is intermediate between the initial symmetrical form and the smaller wing shape. It is widely held that Gütter had produced such instruments prior to the 1881 US patent and thus inspired it, but that assertion has yet to be substantiated in any dated source from that time. The German patent only claimed the damping device and ascribed no significance to the profile of the "zither like" instrument to which it was attached. The further applicability of the device to a piano was claimed in the “provisional specification” of British Patent 1884:8888 for “Improvements in Stringed Musical Instruments”, submitted on September 4, 1884, without drawings by the British patent agent Herbert John Hadden on behalf of Johann Matthäus Grob and Karl August Gütter.

Nine months were allowed for what might be substantial changes to a provisional specification before a “complete specification” was required. The date initially assigned to the application was retained throughout the examination process and given to the approved patent however great the differences in the two specifications might be. Grob and Gütter changed the focus of their claims entirely in a complete specification submitted on March 11, 1885. It dropped all mention of the piano and replaced the mechanical damping device taken from the German patent, with perpendicularly operated bars of the type exhibited by Zimmermann at the 1884 World's Fair. A second means for permitting “the various tones belonging to a harmonious chord” to be produced on a zither was added. It attached plectrums to bars with the lateral action of Zimmermann's 1881 patent.

The profiles of both of alternatives in the March 1885 drawings are identical not just to each other, but to Zimmermann's small-style autoharps as well. This cannot reasonably have been coincidental but the question of who first used that profile remains to be resolved. It is not claimed as an innovative detail in the cited patents. If damping bars are taken as the definitive attribute of an autoharp, the question of its external contour might therefore appear to be moot. Nevertheless, overriding significance has been ascribed to the characteristic wing-shaped profile when dating the advent of the modern autoharp. It is generally accepted that Zimmermann had begun producing small-style autoharps by 1885 but no exact date has been determined. Gütter's variant is first described in the complete specification of his British patent, dated March 11 of that year. The ascription of clear priority to Gütter is based on the conflation of the 1884 date assigned to the patent upon its initial submission, with that of the later complete specification. Although this may still correctly reflect the first appearance of the contended profile, it is no less plausible that Gütter took it from the same source that provided his revised bar design.

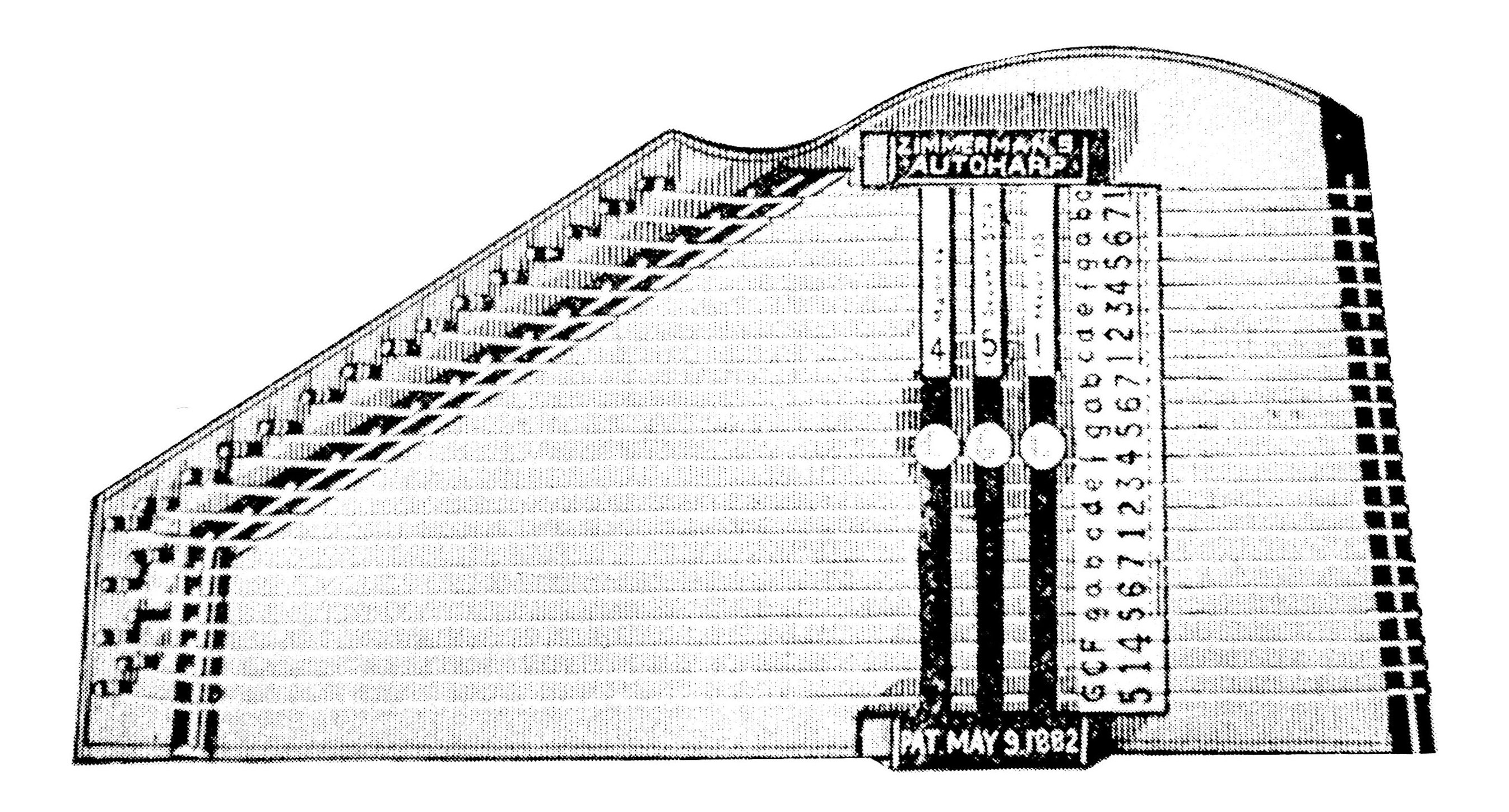
Catalog illustration of a C. F. Zimmermann Style No. 1 autoharp

=== Trademark ===
Charles F. Zimmermann obtained US trademark no. 22,339 for the word "Autoharp" on January 17, 1893. He filed the application on December 22, 1892, claiming to have used it continuously in his business since the patent for the so-named instrument was issued, and as a trademark in international commerce “particularly with England.”. A stylized representation of the word was registered as a trademark in 1926. The word itself is currently claimed as a trademark by the U.S. Music Corporation, whose Oscar Schmidt Inc. division manufactures autoharps. The USPTO registration, however, covers only a “Mark Drawing Code (5) Words, Letters, and/or Numbers in Stylized Form” and has expired. In litigation with George Orthey, it was held that Oscar Schmidt could only claim ownership of the graphic device, the word autoharp having come into generic use.

== Construction ==
The autoharp body is made of wood. The soundboard generally features a guitar-like sound-hole, and the top may be either solid wood or of laminated construction. A pin-block of multiple laminated layers of wood occupies the top and slanted edges, and serves as a bed for the tuning pins, which resemble those used in pianos and concert zithers.

On the edge opposite the top pin-block is either a series of metal pins, or a grooved metal plate, which accepts the lower ends of the strings. Directly above the strings, on the lower half of the top, are the chord bars, which are made of plastic, wood, or metal, and support felt or foam pads on the side facing the strings. These bars are mounted on springs, and pressed down with one hand, via buttons mounted to their topside. The buttons are labeled with the name of the chord produced when that bar is pressed against the strings, and the strings strummed. The back of the instrument usually has three wooden, plastic, or rubber "feet", which support the instrument when it is placed backside down on a table top, for playing in the traditional position.

Strings run parallel to the top, between the mounting plate and the tuning pins, and pass under the chord bar assembly. Modern autoharps most often have 36 strings, with some examples having as many as 47 strings, and rare 48-string models (such as Orthey Autoharps No. 136, tuned to G and D major). They are strung in a semi-chromatic manner which, however, is sometimes modified into either diatonic or fully chromatic scales. Standard models have 12, 15 or 21 chord bars available, providing a selection of major, minor, and dominant seventh chords. These are arranged for historical or systemic reasons. Various special models have also been produced, such as diatonic one-, two-, or three-key models, models with fewer or additional chords, and a reverse-strung model (the 43-string, 28-chord Chromaharp Caroler).

=== Range and tuning ===
The range is determined by the number of strings and their tuning. A typical 36-string chromatic autoharp in standard tuning has a 3 1/2-octave range, from F_{2} to C_{6}. The instrument is not fully chromatic throughout this range, however, as this would require 44 strings. The exact 36-string tuning is:

Octave	Tuning											
Bass octave	F_{2}		G_{2}					C_{3}		D_{3}		E_{3}
Tenor octave	F_{3}	F♯_{3}	G_{3}		A_{3}	A♯_{3}	B_{3}	C_{4}	C♯_{4}	D_{4}	D♯_{4}	E_{4}
Alto octave	F_{4}	F♯_{4}	G_{4}	G♯_{4}	A_{4}	A♯_{4}	B_{4}	C_{5}	C♯_{5}	D_{5}	D♯_{5}	E_{5}
Soprano octave	F_{5}	F♯_{5}	G_{5}	G♯_{5}	A_{5}	A♯_{5}	B_{5}	C_{6}				

There are a number of gaps in the lowest octave, which functions primarily to provide bass notes in diatonic contexts; there is also a missing G♯_{3} in the tenor octave. The fully chromatic part of the instrument's range begins with A_{3} (the A below middle C).

Diatonically-strung single-key instruments from modern luthiers are known for their lush sound. This is achieved by doubling the strings for individual notes. Since the strings for notes not in the diatonic scale need not appear in the string bed, the resulting extra space is used for the doubled strings, resulting in fewer damped strings. Two- and three-key diatonics compromise the number of doubled strings to gain the ability to play in two or three keys, and to permit tunes containing accidentals, which could not otherwise be rendered on a single-key harp. A three-key harp in the circle of fifths, such as a GDA, is often called a festival or campfire harp, as the instrument can easily accompany fiddles around a campfire or at a festival.

=== Chord bars ===
The standard, factory chord bar layout for a 12-chord autoharp, in two rows, is:

Gm		A^{7}		Dm		E^{7}		Am		D^{7}
	B♭		C^{7}		F		G^{7}		C		G

The standard, factory chord bar layout for a 15-chord instrument, in two rows, is:

	D		Gm		A^{7}		Dm		E^{7}		Am		D^{7}
E♭		F^{7}		B♭		C^{7}		F		G^{7}		C		G

The standard, factory chord bar layout for a 21-chord instrument is in three rows:

E♭			B♭			F			C			G			D			A
	F^{7}			C^{7}			G^{7}			D^{7}			A^{7}			E^{7}			B^{7}
		A♭			B♭^{7}			Cm			Gm			Dm			Am			Em

A variety of chord bar layouts may be had, both in as-delivered instruments, and after customization.

=== Electric autoharp ===
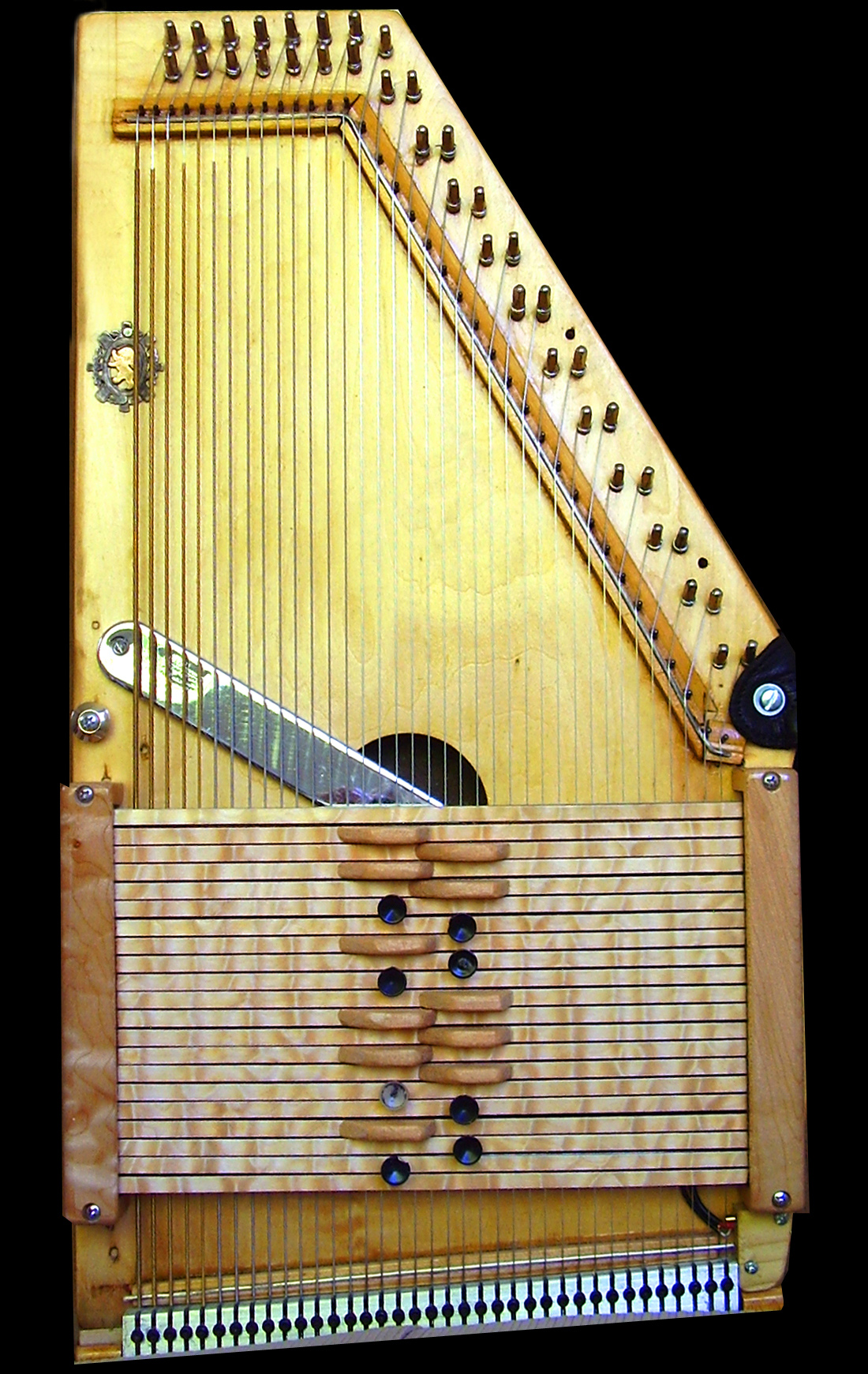
Custom electric autoharp of autoharpist Roger Penney

Until the 1960s, no pickups were available to amplify the autoharp other than rudimentary contact microphones, which frequently had a poor-quality, tinny sound. In the early 1960s, a bar magnetic pickup was designed for the instrument by Harry DeArmond, and manufactured by Rowe Industries. Pinkerton's Assorted Colours used the instrument on their 1966 single "Mirror, Mirror". In the 1970s, Oscar Schmidt came out with their own magnetic pickup. The Evil One, a 1979 hard rock album by Roky Erickson and the Aliens prominently featured the electric autoharp of Bill Miller which granted "an unearthly edge" to the music.

Shown is a 1930 refinished Oscar Schmidt “Model A”. This harp has two DeArmond magnetic pickups (one under the chord bars), with a d'Aigle fine-tuning mechanism, and d'Aigle chord bar assembly, and was used in a 1968 MGM Records/Heritage Records recording by Euphoria.

=== Variants ===
The Suzuki Musical Instrument Corporation introduced an electronic, synthesized version of the autoharp called the Omnichord in 1981. Omnichord models have continued to be produced, with the OM-108 being released in 2024.

== Playing technique ==
As initially conceived, the autoharp was played in the position of a concert zither, that is, with the instrument set flat on a table (there are three feet on the back for this purpose), and the flat-edge of the instrument (below the chord bars) placed to the player's right. The left hand worked the chord buttons, and the right hand would strum the strings in the narrow area below the chord bars. Right hand strums were typically done with a plectrum similar to a guitar pick, made of shell, plastic, or compressed felt. A strum would usually activate multiple strings, playing the chord held down by the left hand.

Partly because of this playing mode, the autoharp came to be thought of as a rhythm instrument for playing chordal accompaniment, and even today many still think of the instrument in that way. New techniques have been developed, however, and modern players can play melodies on the instrument: diatonic players, for example, are able to play fiddle tunes using open-chording techniques, "pumping" the damper buttons while picking individual strings. Skilled chromatic players can perform a range of melodies, and even solos including melody, chords, and complex rhythmic accompaniments.

In the mid-20th century performers began experimenting with taking the instrument off the table and playing it in an upright position, held in the lap, with the back of the instrument (having the "feet") held against the chest. Cecil Null, of the Grand Ole Opry is usually credited as the first to adopt this playing style in public performance, in the 1950s. In this position the left hand still works the chord buttons, but from the opposite edge of the instrument, and the right hand still executes the strums, but now plays in the area above the chord bars. (See Joe Butler illustration, below.) This playing mode makes a wider area of the strings available to the picking hand, increasing the range of tonal possibilities, and it proved very popular. It was soon adopted by other performers, notably by members of the Carter Family.

By the early 1970s some players were experimenting with finger-style techniques, where individual fingers of the right hand would pluck specific strings, rather than simply hold a pick and strum chords. Bryan Bowers became a master of this mode of playing, and developed a complex technique utilizing all five fingers of his right hand. This allows him to play independent bass notes, chords, melody, and counter melodies as a soloist. Bowers was also one of the early pioneers in adding a strap to the instrument and playing it while standing up.

== Notable performers ==
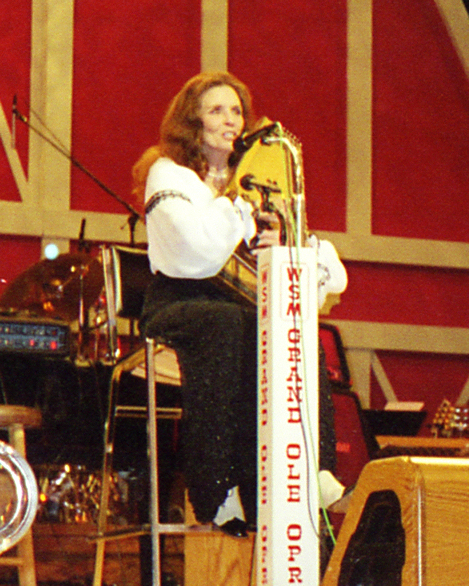
Singer and songwriter June Carter Cash performing in the Grand Ole Opry at Nashville in 1999

The American folk musician and virtuoso autoharpist Kilby Snow won the title of Autoharp Champion of North Carolina at the age of five. He developed the "drag note" playing style, a technique that relied on his left-handedness to produce "slurred" notes. He has been influential among autoharpists, and is regarded by many as the first modern autoharp player.

The American country musician Maybelle Carter brought the instrument to prominence in the late 1940s by using it as a lead instrument when performing with her daughters the Carter Sisters. Carter's granddaughter Carlene Carter plays the autoharp onstage and on her recordings of songs that include "Me and the Wildwood Rose". Several Lovin' Spoonful songs feature the autoharp playing of John Sebastian, including "Do You Believe in Magic" and "You Didn't Have to Be So Nice". He played the instrument in the 1979 Randy VanWarmer hit song "Just When I Needed You Most".

Bryan Bowers developed a complex finger-picking style of playing the autoharp (as opposed to the more common strumming technique) which he initially brought to bluegrass performances with The Dillards in the 1970s, and later to several of his own solo albums.

British singer songwriter Corinne Bailey Rae regularly plays the autoharp and composed the title track from her 2010 album The Sea on the autoharp.

Norwegian avant-garde artist Sturle Dagsland frequently performs with an autoharp.

Singer/songwriter Brittain Ashford of the band Prairie Empire is known for using autoharp in her music, including the 2008 release "There, but for You, go I". She also regularly performs on the autoharp as part of her role in Ghost Quartet, a four-person song cycle composed by Dave Malloy.

French singer/songwriter Pomme performs with an autoharp for songs such as "les oiseaux" "On brulera" "Umbrella" and many more.

American singer/harper Stevie Beck was a regular guest on A Prairie Home Companion in the late 70's and early 80's. Host Garrison Keillor would often refer to her as the "Queen of the Autoharp".

American multi-instrumentalist and folk guitar wizard Harvey Reid has released two solo autoharp albums, The Autoharp Album (2003) and The Autoharp Waltz (2013).

== See also ==
- Guitar zither (chord zither, fretless zither)
- Guitaro
- Omnichord (electronic autoharp)

== Sources ==
- Blackley, Becky (1983). The Autoharp Book. I.A.D. Publications. ISBN 9780912827018.
