= Redemption Paws =

Canadian dog rescue charity

- Formation: September 2017; 9 years ago
- Type: Charity
- Registration no.: 795539311 RR 0001
- Purpose: Dog rescue
- Headquarters: Toronto, Ontario, Canada
- CEO: Nicole Simone
- Website: redemptionpaws.org

Redemption Paws is a Canadian dog rescue charity based in Toronto that was established in 2017.

== Organization ==
In September 2017, CBC News reported that Redemption Paws transported 39 dogs from Houston, Texas to Ontario following Hurricane Harvey, with the animals temporarily housed at the Ontario SPCA facility in Stouffville.

Redemption Paws is a Toronto-based non-profit and charity that relocates dogs from countries affected by climate change, natural disaster, or canine overpopulation. The organisation was founded in September 2017.

== Program and Operations ==
A Reader's Digest article reported the efforts of Redemption Paws, stating that the organization had completed two missions to Houston, successfully bringing 63 homeless pups into Canada, and giving them another shot at life. The article detailed the efforts of Canadians rescuing homeless dogs from Hurricane Harvey, and mentioned Nicole Simone, the CEO of Redemption Paws as a long-time animal shelter volunteer.

In 2020, The Toronto Sun reported that Redemption Paws sought clarification from federal authorities regarding cross-border animal rescue during COVID-19, after which federal guidance was clarified to allow rescue organizations to continue transporting animals across the Canada–United States border.

In 2021, the organisation rescued Elevado, a U.S. dog that was paralysed by a gunshot. During the COVID-19 pandemic the organization had a surplus of dogs up for adoption and launched Streamlined Adoption Month in August 2021.

In a March 2022 Toronto Star investigation, over 24 sources, including 19 staff and ex-volunteers, including a former executive director, reported concerns about the practices the organisation. An April 2022 Toronto Star investigative report profiled the experience of one rescue dog and the Redemption Paws "Dogs From Away" project, which sent rescue dogs to Newfoundland.

In 2024 Redemption Paws announced that it had hit a milestone of rescuing over 4000 dogs. In early 2026 Redemption Paws announced that it had rescued over 402 dogs and cats (365 dogs, 37 cats) in 2025 through its community based foster program. The 2025 rescue activity included animals taken into care from Ontario as well as from parts of the United States where shelter overcrowding is significant. Redemption Paws operates without a physical shelter, relying on volunteer foster homes and partner veterinary clinics for animal care.
