= Angel (American band) =

American rock band

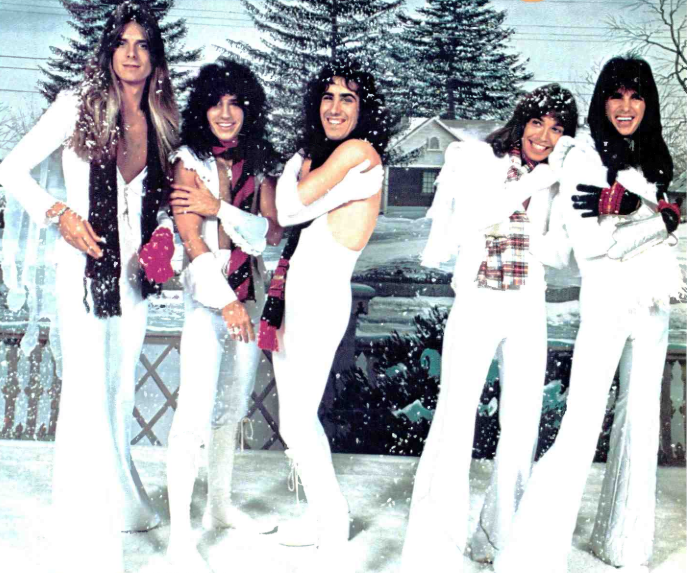

Background information
- Origin: Washington, D.C., U.S.
- Genres: Glam rock; hard rock
- Years active: 1975–1981, 1987, 1998–present
- Labels: Casablanca; Coallier Entertainment; Cleopatra Records
- Members: Punky Meadows; Frank DiMino; Tommy Caradonna; Danny Farrow; Charlie Calv; Billy Orrico
- Past members: Mickie Jones; Fergie Frederiksen; Ricky Phillips; Randy Gregg; Gordon G.G. Gebert; Steve Blaze; Michael T. Ross; Richard Marcello; Barry Brandt; Gregg Giuffria; Felix Robinson; Steve E. Ojane
- Website: Official Angel Website at the Wayback Machine (archived January 6, 2023)

Angel is an American rock band from Washington, D.C., formed in 1975 by Punky Meadows, Mickey Jones, and Gregg Giuffria. They were primarily known for their flamboyant glam stage presence and white satin outfits.

== History ==
Angel was discovered by Kiss bass player Gene Simmons performing at a nightclub and was eventually signed to the same label as Kiss, Casablanca.

Angel's image of dressing in all white was a deliberate contrast to Kiss, who wore black. Angel sported an androgynous image and elaborate stage sets. Frank Zappa wrote a satirical song about Punky Meadows, with Punky's approval, titled "Punky's Whips". Angel never achieved mass commercial success but acquired a following as a cult band.

Their first album was the self-titled Angel (1975) with the band consisting of guitarist Punky Meadows, bassist Mickie Jones, vocalist Frank DiMino, keyboardist Gregg Giuffria, and drummer Barry Brandt. This lineup would hold for the following two albums, Helluva Band (1976) and On Earth as It Is in Heaven (1977), after which Jones was replaced by Felix Robinson.

Angel made an appearance in the film Foxes (1980) and Frank DiMino sang "Seduce Me Tonight" on the Flashdance (1983) soundtrack and "Blood From a Stone" on the Metropolis (1984) soundtrack, credited as Cycle V on both.

DiMino and Meadows departed the band in 1981, and the remaining members brought in vocalist Fergie Frederiksen (later of Toto) and guitarist Ricky Phillips (later of The Babys, then Bad English, then Styx), but this lineup did not release new material and it dissolved shortly thereafter.

The former members of Angel went on to other things following the release of their live album. Lead vocalist Frank DiMino joined UFO guitarist Paul Raymond in the Paul Raymond Project in which he sang lead vocals. Bassist Felix Robinson played on the debut album of the band White Lion, Fight to Survive (1985/1986). Angel's keyboardist Gregg Giuffria had success as the leader of the band Giuffria during the 1980s as well as with the band House of Lords, who—sans Giuffria—reunited in 2002 and released a new album, The Power and the Myth on Frontiers Records.

In the late 1990s, Angel reformed with a new line-up: Frank DiMino, vocals; Barry Brandt, drums; Randy Gregg, bass; Steve Blaze, guitars; and keyboardist Gordon G.G. Gebert. Gebert left the band in 2002 and was replaced with Michael T. Ross on keyboards. The band's 1999 release In the Beginning also features guest appearances by original guitarist Punky Meadows, as well as Robinson. In 2000 came the release of Angel: The Collection, making it the most extensive Angel greatest hits compilation, including 16 songs.

In 2006, two compilations of career-spanning singles were released. "Better Days" from the White Hot (1977) album was notably replaced with "The Winter Song". It had only been previously released on a rare 7" single.

Bassist Mickie Jones (born Donald Eugene Jones on December 17, 1952, later changed to Michael David Jones in 1967), died in San Dimas, California on September 5, 2009, at the age of 56, after a long battle with liver cancer. Jones performed on four Angel albums (Angel, Helluva Band, On Earth as It Is in Heaven and An Anthology). He toured extensively with the band in the United States for several years. Before Angel, he played in the rock group BUX, which included guitarist Punky Meadows (Angel) and singer Ralph Morman (Joe Perry Project, and Savoy Brown). BUX released one album on Capitol Records, We Came to Play in 1976 (recorded in 1973). Both Jones and Meadows were asked to join the New York Dolls but declined. After leaving Angel, he formed the Los Angeles band EMPIRE and was the lead singer. Empire included drummer Steve Riley (L.A. Guns). Over the years, he became interested in film production and would later work in the film industry.

Singer Frank DiMino now resides in Las Vegas, Nevada. He appeared on the Sin City Sinners Christmas album, singing lead vocals on the holiday classic "Winter Wonderland". In 2015 he released his solo album "Old Habits Die Hard", with Punky guesting on the song 'Never Again'.

Punky Meadows issued his first-ever solo album in 2016, Fallen Angel. Felix Robinson plays bass on the album. The deluxe edition had two bonus songs, one of which, 'Lost and Lonely', had Frank DiMino on vocals. Later Angel members Danny Farrow and Charlie Calv participate on this album as well.

In 2018, Meadows and DiMino toured together under the moniker 'Punky Meadows and Frank DiMino of Angel', performing a set of classic Angel songs and solo cuts. They are backed by a band featuring Danny Farrow on rhythm guitar, Charlie Calv on keyboards, Steve Ojane on bass and Billy Orrico on drums. In 2019, with the same lineup, the band reverted back to the name "Angel"—returning to wearing all white—and released a new album, Risen. The band returned with new music on the 2023 album Once Upon a Time.

Bassist Steve Ojane left the band at the end of 2023. Felix Robinson rejoined the band for select dates in 2024. Tommy Caradonna is announced as the new bass player.

== Logo ==
Angel's logo is ambigrammatic; it reads the same when turned upside-down as when viewed normally.

== Members ==
Current members

- Frank DiMino — lead vocals (1975–1981, 1999–2008, 2018–present)
- Edwin "Punky" Meadows — lead guitar (1975–1981, 2018–present)
- Danny Farrow — rhythm guitar, backing vocals (2018–present)
- Charlie Calv — keyboards (2018–present)
- Billy Orrico — drums, backing vocals (2018–present)
- Tommy Caradonna — bass, backing vocals (2024–present)

Former members

- Barry Brandt — drums, percussion, backing vocals (1975–1981, 1999–2008)
- Gregg Giuffria — keyboards (1975–1981)
- Mickey Jones — bass, backing vocals (1975–1977; died 2009)
- Felix Robinson — bass, backing vocals (1977–1981; 2024 as stand-in)
- Dennis Frederiksen — lead vocals (1981; died 2014)
- Ricky Phillips — guitar (1981)
- Richard Marcello — guitar, keyboards (1999–2000)
- Leo Borrero — bass (1999, studio only)
- Randy Gregg — bass, backing vocals (1999–2008)
- Gordon "G. G." Gebert — keyboards (1999–2002)
- Steve Blaze — guitar (2000–2008)
- Michael T. Ross — keyboards (2002–2008)
- Joey Anderson — drums, percussion (2008)
- Keith Robert — guitar (2008)
- Steve Ojane — bass, backing vocals (2018–2023)

Timeline

== Discography ==
=== Studio albums ===
Year	Album	US
1975	Angel	156
1976	Helluva Band	155
1977	On Earth as It Is in Heaven	76
1978	White Hot	55
1979	Sinful	159
1999	In the Beginning	—
2019	Risen	—
2023	Once Upon a Time	—

=== Live albums ===
Year	Album	US
1980	Live Without a Net	149

=== Compilation albums ===
- Foxes (soundtrack) (two songs: "20th Century Foxes" and "Virginia") (1980)
- Can You Feel It (1989)
- An Anthology (1992)
- A Rock and Roll Christmas II (1998)
- Angel: The Collection (2000)
- Angel: The Singles Collection Volume 1 (album) (2006)
- Angel: The Singles Collection Volume 2 (album) (2006)

=== Box set ===
- Angel: The Casablanca years (2018)

=== Bootlegs ===
- Blowing Great Guns
- White Heroes
- 1981 demo

=== Singles ===
US singles, except where noted.

Year	Single	US
1976	Rock & Rollers	—
1976	On and On (UK)	
1976	Anyway You Want It (JPN)	
1976	Feelin' Right (JPN)	
1977	That Magic Touch	77
1977	Telephone Exchange (JPN)	
1977	Winter Song	(Note: No. 26 Netherlands No. 32 New Zealand)
1978	Flying With Broken Wings	—
1978	Ain't Gonna Eat Out My Heart Anymore	44
1978	Don't Leave Me Lonely	—
1979	Don't Take Your Love	—
1979	Tower (NL)	
1980	20th Century Foxes	—
