= Live Without a Net (album) =

Live album by Angel
- Released: February 1980
- Venue: Long Beach Arena; Santa Monica Civic Auditorium; May–June 1978
- Genre: Hard rock
- Length: 41:23 (Disc one); 39:32 (Disc two); 80:56 (Total)
- Label: Casablanca, Mercury
- Producer: Eddie Leonetti

Angel chronology
Sinful (1979)	Live Without a Net (1980)	Can You Feel It (1989)

Professional ratings
Review scores
Source	Rating
Allmusic	2/5 stars
Record Mirror	4/5 stars

Live Without a Net is the first live album and the sixth in total by the rock band Angel, recorded during the band's 1978 White Hot tour. It was the band's last album before breaking up in 1981. The band had hoped that the album would bring them commercial success, like the album Alive! did for Kiss, but it did not, leading to Angel's break up a year later. The first CD issues cut out the audience in order to fit the entire album onto one CD. All reissues since the 2000s have been released on two discs and contain the album's full content.

== Track listing ==
=== Disc one ===
1. "Tower" – 5:02
2. "Can You Feel It" – 4:07
3. "Don't Leave Me Lonely" – 4:00
4. "Telephone Exchange" – 4:08
5. "Ain't Gonna Eat Out My Heart Anymore" – 3:27
6. "Over and Over" – 5:02
7. "Anyway You Want It" – 2:55
8. "On the Rocks" – 9:18
9. "Wild and Hot" – 3:19

=== Disc two ===
1. "All the Young Dudes" – 4:35
2. "Rock and Rollers" – 8:03
3. "White Lightning" – 8:35
4. "Hold Me, Squeeze Me" – 3:28
5. "Got Love If You Want It" – 4:07
6. "Feelin' Right" – 5:56
7. "20th Century Foxes" – 4:45

== Personnel ==
- Frank DiMino - lead vocals
- Punky Meadows - lead guitars
- Felix Robinson - bass guitar
- Barry Brandt - drums
- Gregg Giuffria - keyboards
