= Without a Net (film) =

2012 film directed by Kelly J Richardson

- Directed by: Kelly J Richardson
- Release date: 2012

Without a Net is a 2012 American documentary film directed by Kelly J Richardson.

== Synopsis ==
In an abandoned parking lot in a Rio de Janeiro favela sits a circus tent—an incongruous sight, but no more unusual than its motley crew of young performers, searching for a life apart from the drug-related violence around them. As chronicled by first-time feature filmmaker Kelly J Richardson, putting on a show takes rigor and resourcefulness in their impoverished community, and even this modest production of acrobats and contortionists isn't free of injuries and ego clashes. But the big top is their oasis, and the human drama of hope and ambition the greatest show on earth.

== Reception ==
The film had a theatrical release and Academy Qualifying run in Los Angeles and New York City through International Documentary Association (IDA)'s DocuWeeks, was voted a "Festival Favorite" at the Atlanta Film Festival, and screened in the Mill Valley Film Festival, Raindance Film Festival in London, Hot Springs Documentary Film Festival, San Francisco Documentary Film Festival, Red Rock Film Festival, and others.
