= Roger Penney =

American musician

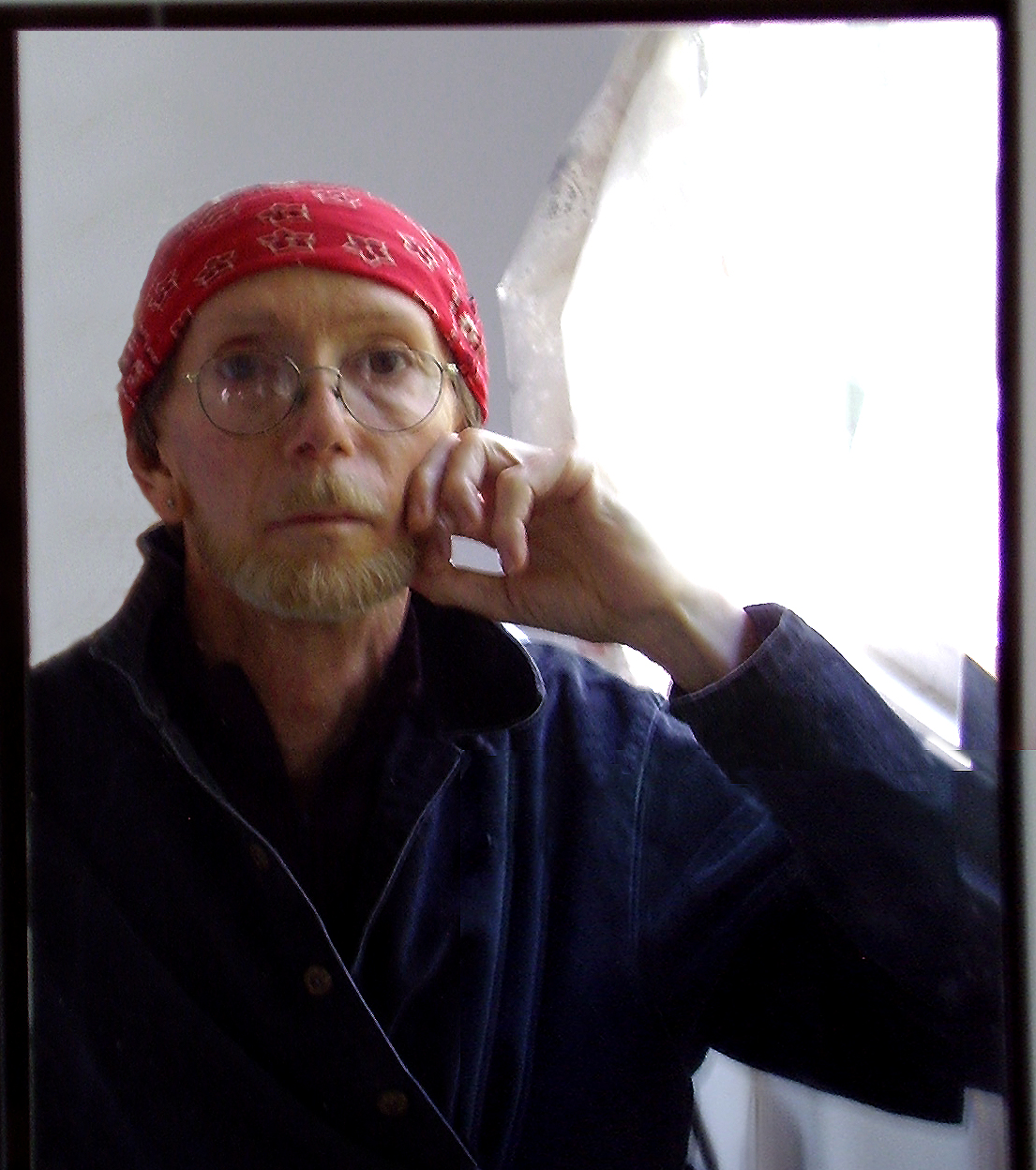
- Roger Penney 2009

Background information
- Also known as: Roger Becket
- Born: Roger D. Penney; 1939 or 1940 (age 85–86); Worcester, Massachusetts
- Origin: Greenwich Village, New York, US
- Genres: Psychedelic folk, folk rock, country folk
- Occupations: Singer, songwriter, instrumentalist
- Instruments: Vocal, autoharp, keyboards
- Years active: 1966–present
- Labels: MGM, Heritage Records, Winter Solstice, Acme Records

Roger D. Penney is a singer, songwriter and multi-instrumentalist. He pioneered a style of American psychedelic folk music in the late 60s, early 70s and is known for his inventive performances and recordings as Bermuda Triangle Band as well as Roger and Wendy and Euphoria.

== History ==
Roger D. Penney was born in Worcester, Massachusetts around 1940. Penney was instrumental in the design and construction of the first electromechanical harpsichord which came to be known as the Baldwin Combo Harpsichord, see Electric Piano. In 1966 in Greenwich Village, New York City, he formed the band Roger and Wendy with his partner, Wendy Penney. Performing in Village coffeehouses and clubs, such as Gerde's Folk City, the Cafe Wha? The Bitter End and the Cafe Au Go Go, they broke ground in what has come to be known as the psychedelic folk genre. They were one of the very few Americans to play in this style as it was primarily a British movement. Characterized as having strong roots in folk music, it has electric and often complex or unconventional arrangements, with liberal use of effects such as phasing, wah wah or fuzz. In 1969 Roger and Wendy formed Euphoria with two other musicians and released an album on the MGM/Heritage label titled "Euphoria" and a single "You Must Forget". Then the group disbanded. Roger and Wendy then began performing on national college concert tours. They released a folk album "Roger and Wendy" in 1971. Renaming the band as Bermuda Triangle Band in 1975, they released the psychedelic folk, folk rock albums Bermuda Triangle in 1977 and Bermudas II in 1984. College concert tours continued with more than 4,000 performances from the 70's thru the 90's. A bootlegged reissued CD of the Bermuda Triangle's 1977 vinyl album was released in 2006, and 2007 saw the release of their psychedelic folk The Missing Tapes CD.

Roger Penney is regarded as the originator and developer of psychedelic folk autoharp, as well as the first person to play electric autoharp. He used his electrified harp as the lead instrument on all recordings. Among the effects units he used were two Gibson Maestro G2's which triggered wah-wah, fuzz or distortion, percussion etc. an Eventide Clockworks phase shifter, a Lexicon Primetime digital delay. An additional effect came from transducers mounted on the autoharp and wired into a Linndrum sound module which allowed the option of playing percussion/drum rhythms simultaneously while finger-picking the strings.

== Discography ==
=== Euphoria ===
- Euphoria MGM/Heritage Records (1969), vinyl LP
- Euphoria Heritage/Beatball Records (2007), reissued as a CD

=== Roger and Wendy ===
- Roger and Wendy Horny Records (1971)
- "Roger Penney: The Electric Autoharpist" Winter Solstice Records (2008)
- "Roger and Wendy" (Love Rog and Wem) CD Reissued on Lion Productions (2010)

=== Bermuda Triangle Band ===
- Bermuda Triangle Winter Solstice Records (1977)
- Bermudas ll Winter Solstice Records (1984)
- Bermuda Triangle unofficial reissue on Radioactive UK Records (2006)
- Bermuda Triangle Winter Solstice Records (2007), reissued as a CD
- The Missing Tapes Winter Solstice Records (2007)
- "Bermuda Triangle" Reissued 12 inch vinyl LP on Anazitisi Records (2008)
- "The Missing Tapes" vinyl LP on Anazitisi Records (2009)
