= Kilby Snow =

- Born: John Kilby Snow; May 28, 1905; Grayson County, Virginia, United States
- Died: March 29, 1980 (aged 74)
- Genres: American folk music
- Occupation: Musician
- Instrument: Autoharp
- Years active: 1910s – 1970s
- Label: Folkways

Kilby Snow (May 28, 1905 – March 29, 1980) was an American folk musician. A virtuoso autoharpist, he was awarded the title of Autoharp Champion of North Carolina at the age of 5, but recorded only a single album for Folkways Records in the 1960s.

He was known for his "drag note" playing style, a technique that relied on his left-handedness to produce slurred notes that would be impossible for a right-handed player to recreate due to the reversed relationship between thumb and finger.
