= Angel (Angel album) =

Studio album by Angel
- Released: October 27, 1975
- Recorded: Wally Heider Studios, Hollywood, California
- Genre: Hard rock
- Length: 37:08
- Label: Casablanca, Mercury
- Producer: Derek Lawrence, Big Jim Sullivan

Angel chronology
Angel (1975)	Helluva Band (1976)

Professional ratings
Review scores
Source	Rating
Allmusic	2.5/5 stars

Angel is the first album by the rock band Angel. "Tower", the keyboard-heavy opening track, was used widely during the late 1970s and early 1980s by album rock radio stations in the US for various advertising purposes. The track is also on K-SHE radio's Classic List. This album can be seen as representing the band's early progressive roots, with Helluva Band seeing the group starting to move towards an increasingly hard rock-oriented sound. Tracks 6–8 segue to form a 10-minute mini suite.

== Track listing ==
1. "Tower" – 6:59 (Frank Dimino, Greg Giuffria, Punky Meadows)
2. "Long Time" – 7:02 (Dimino, Giuffria, Meadows)
3. "Rock and Rollers" – 4:01 (Dimino, Giuffria, Meadows)
4. "Broken Dreams" – 5:15 (Dimino, Meadows)
5. "Mariner" – 4:23 (Dimino, Giuffria, Big Jim Sullivan, Derek Lawrence)
6. "Sunday Morning" – 4:10 (Dimino, Giuffria)
7. "On & On" – 4:19 (Dimino, Giuffria, Meadows, Mickey Jones)
8. "Angel (Theme)" – 1:39 (Giuffria, Barry Brandt)

== Personnel ==
- Frank DiMino - lead vocals
- Punky Meadows - lead and acoustic guitars
- Gregg Giuffria - organ, piano, clavinet, harpsichord, Mellotron, synthesizers, string ensemble
- Mickie Jones - bass guitar
- Barry Brandt - drums, percussion

== Production ==
- Arranged by Angel
- Produced by Derek Lawrence and Big Jim Sullivan
- Recording and mix by Peter Granet
- Mastered at Allen Zentz Mastering
- All songs published by White Angel Music.
