= Gregg Giuffria =

American rock musician and businessman (born 1951)

- Born: July 28, 1951 (age 75)
- Genres: Hard rock, heavy metal, progressive rock
- Occupation: Musician
- Instruments: Keyboards, Synthesizers, Piano, Keytar, Organ, Vocals
- Years active: 1970s-present

Gregg Giuffria (born July 28, 1951) is an American rock musician and businessman. He was the keyboardist for album-oriented rock bands Angel, House of Lords, and Giuffria.

== Career ==
Giuffria is originally from Gulfport, Mississippi, where he graduated from high school in 1969. He played keyboards with several local bands including The Telstars and Flower Power, before moving to the US East Coast, where in late 1974 he formed Angel. After that band broke up in 1981, Giuffria put together his own band, Giuffria, with vocalist David Glen Eisley, guitarist Craig Goldy, bassist Chuck Wright, and drummer Alan Krigger. They released an eponymous album and a single "Call to the Heart", which made the Top 20 on the Billboard Hot 100. The band broke up after the commercial failure of their next album Silk and Steel in 1986.

Giuffria then put together the House of Lords, with help from Kiss' Gene Simmons, and signed to Simmons' label. The first album, House of Lords, was released in 1988.

In an interview, Giuffria announced that he is working on a solo project, tentatively titled Giuffria, with the album expected to be released by the end of 2025.

== Discography ==
=== With Angel ===
- Angel (1975)
- Helluva Band (1976)
- On Earth as It Is in Heaven (1977)
- White Hot (1978)
- Sinful (1979)
- Live Without a Net (1980)

=== With Giuffria ===
- Giuffria (1984)
- Gotcha! OST (1985)
- Silk and Steel (1986)
- The Unreleased Remastered Demos (2025)

=== With House of Lords ===
- House of Lords (1988)
- Sahara (1990)
- Demons Down (1992)
