= Helluva Band =

Studio album by Angel
- Released: June 1976
- Genre: Hard rock, progressive rock, pop rock
- Length: 44:07
- Label: Casablanca, Mercury
- Producer: Derek Lawrence, Big Jim Sullivan

Angel chronology
Angel (1975)	Helluva Band (1976)	On Earth as It Is in Heaven (1977)

Professional ratings
Review scores
Source	Rating
Allmusic	link

Helluva Band is the second album by the rock band Angel.

== Track listing ==
1. "Feelin' Right" – 4:42 (Frank DiMino, Punky Meadows, Gregg Giuffria)
2. "The Fortune" – 8:40 (DiMino, Meadows, Giuffria)
3. "Anyway You Want It" – 2:52 (DiMino, Meadows, Giuffria)
4. "Dr. Ice" – 5:23 (Derek Lawrence, DiMino, Meadows, Giuffria)
5. "Mirrors" – 4:28 (DiMino, Meadows, Giuffria)
6. "Feelings" – 5:42 (DiMino, Meadows, Giuffria)
7. "Pressure Point" – 5:26 (Barry Brandt, Mickie Jones, DiMino, Meadows)
8. "Chicken Soup" – 4:46 (DiMino, Meadows, Giuffria)
9. "Angel Theme" – 2:32 (Giuffria, Brandt)

The Rock Candy Records reissue features a hidden track after "Angel Theme" - a rare Japanese fan club greeting/recording by the band members in anticipation of going to Japan for the first time.

== Personnel ==
- Frank DiMino: all vocals
- Punky Meadows: all guitars
- Gregg Giuffria: organ, piano, clavinet, harpsichord, Mellotron, synthesizers, ARP string ensemble (Moog programming by Dan Wyman & Jim Cypherd for Sound Arts)
- Mickie Jones: bass guitar
- Barry Brandt: drums, percussion

== Production ==
- Arranged by Angel
- Produced by Derek Lawrence & Big Jim Sullivan
- Recorded & mixed by Peter Granet; Tape Operator: David Geuta
- Mastered by Allen Zentz
