= Heritage Records (United States) =

Heritage Records was an American record label founded in 1968 by record producer Jerry Ross. It was distributed by MGM Records.

It released a number of hits by groups such as The Cherry People, Euphoria, and Bill Deal and the Rhondels.

Ross discontinued the label by late 1970 after he founded a new independently distributed label called Colossus Records.
