= Northern Light Orchestra =

Christmas-themed supergroup

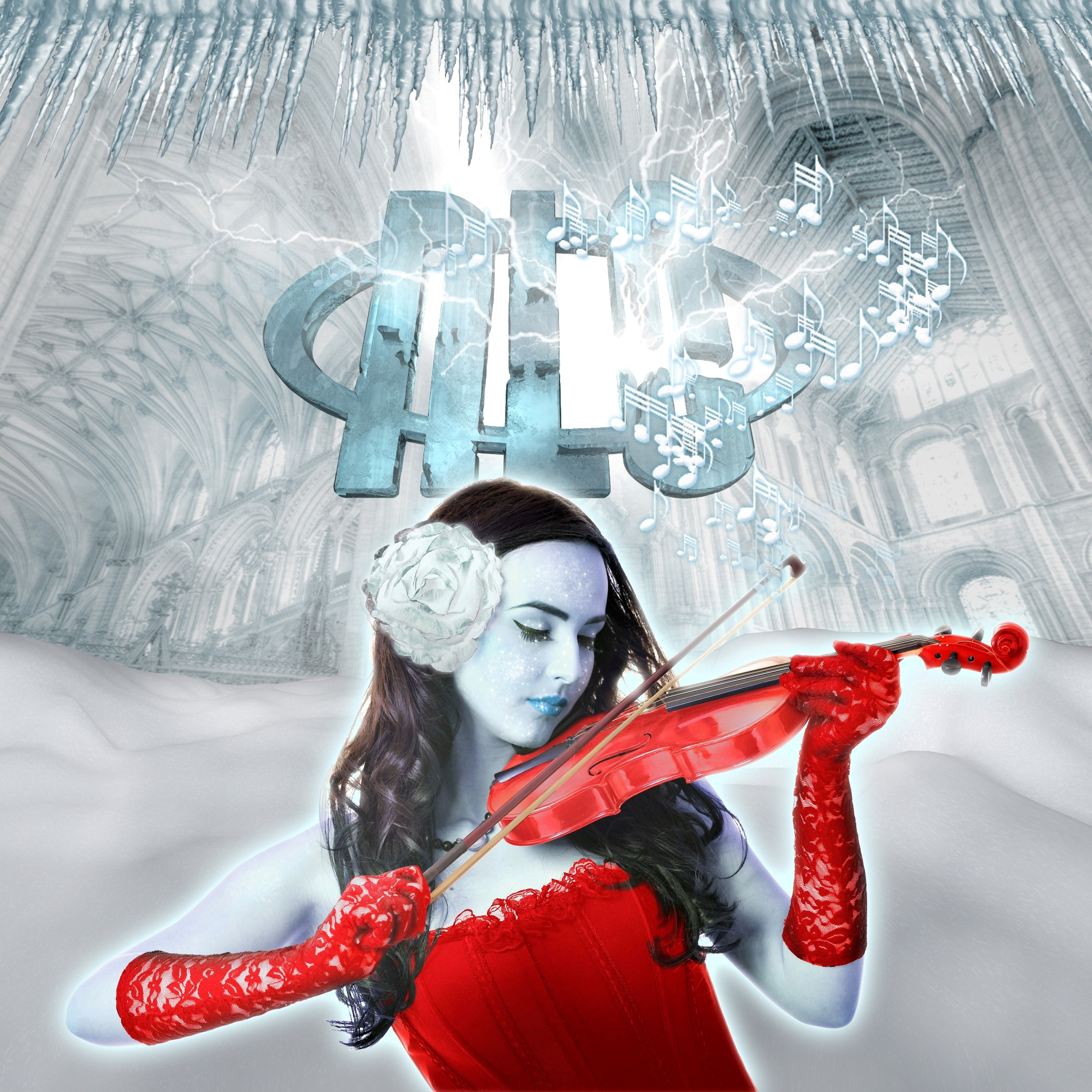
2010 NLO album cover

Northern Light Orchestra is a Christmas-themed supergroup, founded in 2009, and composed of more than twenty artists who have had success in heavy metal and hard rock bands. The group's music has been compared to Trans-Siberian Orchestra.

== Overview ==
Vocalists and musicians who have played with Northern Light Orchestra include members and former members of bands such as the Beach Boys, Sly and the Family Stone, Alice Cooper, Survivor, Steely Dan, Firehouse, Megadeth, Sister Sledge, Quiet Riot, Vanilla Fudge, Winger, Guns N' Roses, Grand Funk Railroad, Kiss, House of Lords, and Whitesnake.

== Partial discography ==
- The Spirit of Christmas (2009)
- Celebrate Christmas (2010)
- The Night Before Christmas (2012)
- Ring Out the Bells (EP, 2013)
- Star of the East (2017)
- Greatest Hits (2018)

== Contributors ==
The following is a partial list of artists who have contributed to the project:

- Bill Leverty (Firehouse)
- Bob Carlisle (Allies, Billy Thermal)
- Bruce Kulick (Kiss, Grand Funk Railroad, Union)
- Chris Sanders (Lizzy Borden)
- Chuck Wright (Quiet Riot, Giuffria, House of Lords)
- Danny Vaughn (Tyketto, Waysted, Vaughn)
- David Ellefson (Megadeth, F5)
- David Victor (Boston)
- Debbie Sledge (Sister Sledge)
- Dizzy Reed (Guns N' Roses, Johnny Crash)
- Doug Aldrich (Whitesnake, Dio)
- Elliot Randall (Steely Dan)
- George Lynch (Dokken, Lynch Mob)
- Glen Drover (Megadeth, Queensrÿche)
- Jason Hook (Five Finger Death Punch, Alice Cooper)
- John Davis (Q and Not U, F5)
- John Elefante (Kansas, Petra, Toto)
- Jon Gibson (Stevie Wonder, Michael Jackson)
- Kane Roberts (Alice Cooper)
- Ken Mary (Fifth Angel, Alice Cooper, Impellitteri)
- Kendall Bechtel (Fifth Angel)
- Kip Winger (Alice Cooper, Winger, Alan Parsons, Jordan Rudess)
- Lanny Cordola (House of Lords, The Beach Boys, Magdalen)
- Lita Ford (The Runaways)
- Mark Slaughter (Slaughter, Vinnie Vincent Invasion)
- Reb Beach (Winger, Night Ranger, Dokken, Whitesnake)
- Robin McAuley (McAuley Schenker Group, Survivor)
- Rose Stone (Sly and the Family Stone), (Elton John Band)
- Shane Gibson (Korn, Jonathan Davis and the SFA)
- Steve Conley (F5)(Flotsam and Jetsam)
- Tim Gaines (Stryper)
- Tony Franklin (The Firm, Paul Rodgers), Jimmy Page)
- Troy Luccketta (Tesla)
- Vinny Appice (Dio, Black Sabbath)
- Vivian Campbell (Sweet Savage, Dio, Whitesnake, Def Leppard)

== See also ==
- Christmas Music
