= Chuck Wright =

American bassist

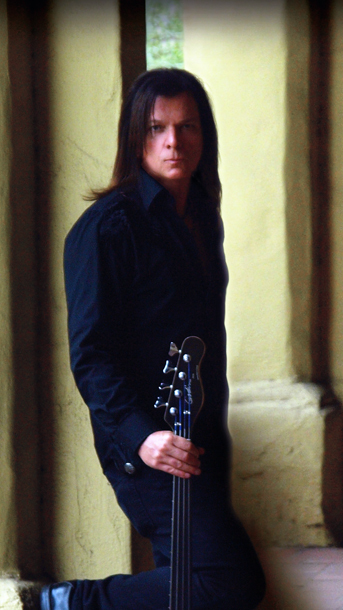
- Wright in 2011

Background information
- Born: September 13, 1959 (age 66); Los Angeles, California, U.S.
- Genres: Heavy metal, hard rock, progressive rock, reggae
- Occupation: Bassist
- Years active: 1982–present
- Formerly of: Quiet Riot, Giuffria, House of Lords

Chuck Wright (born September 13, 1959) is an American bassist, best known as a member of the hard rock/heavy metal band Quiet Riot. He originally joined Quiet Riot in 1982, playing bass on the tracks "Metal Health (Bang Your Head)" and "Don't Wanna Let You Go," as well as singing background vocals on all tracks from the 1983 album Metal Health.

Throughout the 80s and 90s, Wright left and rejoined Quiet Riot multiple times, most recently rejoining in August 2005 for their "Rock Never Stops" tour and staying until the death of lead singer Kevin DuBrow in October 2007. After a three-year hiatus, the band reformed with a new lead vocalist and began touring again in 2010, with Wright remaining in the group until his latest departure in 2021.

Wright is featured in the documentary Quiet Riot – Well Now You're Here, directed and produced by Regina Russell. It premiered at the Newport Beach Film Festival on April 29, 2014, was seen at the Cannes Film Festival, and has aired on the Showtime Network.

== Biography ==
Wright's career in mainstream rock first took off when he joined Giuffria in 1984. Their debut album Giuffria peaked at #26 on the Billboard album charts on March 2, 1985. The album spawned two hit singles, "Call to the Heart" (Hot 100 #15) and "Lonely In Love" (Hot 100 #57). After sold-out arena tours with Deep Purple and Foreigner, Wright left Giuffria to re-join Quiet Riot in 1986, replacing Rudy Sarzo, recording and writing songs for their QRIII release and supporting world tour.

His reputation landed him gigs with Alice Cooper, Slash, Gregg Allman, Carmine Appice, Ronnie Montrose, John Waite, and Pat Travers. Wright has appeared on over 90 worldwide record releases, playing bass and producing albums of various styles, including ambient trance, reggae, rap, country and rock.

He was also involved in seven film scores, including Kull the Conqueror, where he was joined by Guns N' Roses drummer Matt Sorum and the London Philharmonic Orchestra. Over the years, Wright also worked with House of Lords, Bad Moon Rising, Blackthorne, Christian Tolle Project, Doro, Impellitteri, Kuni, MSG, Magdalen, Murderer's Row, Pata, Stephen Pearcy, Adler's Appetite, Love/Hate, Ken Tamplin, and Shane Gibson from Korn. Wright has headed Ultimate Jam Night, a long-running live music show since January 2015 at the Whisky a Go Go in Hollywood.

Wright continued to tour with Quiet Riot until 2021, when Rudy Sarzo returned to the band. He records as a session player, performs live with various rock acts, and is working on his debut solo album. He is endorsed by Ampeg, Godin Guitars, CAD Microphones and Sick Boy Motorcycles and signed by Cleopatra Records.

== Discography ==
=== With Giuffria ===
- Giuffria (1984)
- Gotcha! (1985) (Original Motion Picture Gotcha! Soundtrack)

=== With Quiet Riot ===
- Metal Health (1983) (bass on "Metal Health" & "Don't Wanna Let You Go")
- QR III (1986)
- Down to the Bone (1995)
- Quiet Riot 10 (2014)
- Road Rage (2017)
- Hollywood Cowboys (2019)

=== With House of Lords ===
- House of Lords (1988)
- Sahara (1990)
- The Power and the Myth (2004)
- Live in the UK (2007)
- Anthology (2008)

=== With Heaven & Earth ===
- Dig (2013)
- Hard to Kill (2017)

=== Other releases ===
- KUNI – Masque (1986)
- Gregg Allman – "I'm No Angel"/Demos (1987)
- Ted Nugent – If You Can't Lick 'Em...Lick 'Em (1988)
- Impellitteri – Stand in Line (1988)
- Ann Lewis – Meiki (1988)
- Nobuhiko Satoh – Turning Point (1988)
- Doro Pesch – Doro (1990)
- Rock vs. Rap – Mash Up (1990)
- Sam Kinison – Leader of the Banned (1990)
- Bad Moon Rising – Bad Moon Rising (1991)
- Atsuki – Dinosaur (1991)
- N.W.O.B.H.M. All Stars (1991)
- Impellitteri – Grin and Bear It (1992)
- Magdalen – Revolution Mind (1993)
- Shack Of Peasants – Classic Blues, Vol. 1 (1993)
- Bad Moon Rising – Blood (1994)
- Blackthorne – Afterlife (1994)
- Magdalen – The Dirt (1995)
- The CMC's – All In A Day from Everyday Death Sentence (1995)
- Children of Zion – Reggae Worship Vol. II (1995)
- Pata – Raised on rock (1995)
- Carol Huston – Grace (1995)
- Black On Blond – Wild Anticipation (1995)
- Chaos Is The Poetry – Chaos Is The Poetry (1996)
- Every Day Life – Disgruntled (1996)
- Magdalen – End Of Ages (1996)
- Murderer's Row – Murderer's Row (1996)
- Honey – Paradise (1997)
- Eyes (featuring Jeff Scott Soto) – Eyes (1998)
- Lanny Cordola – Salvation Medecine Show (1998)
- Stuart Smith – Heaven and Earth (1999)
- Magdalen – END OF THE AGES (1999)
- Humanary Stew: A Tribute to Alice Cooper (1999)
- 28if – 28if (1999)
- Odd Man Out – Y2K (2000)
- SX-10 (featuring Sen Dog and Everlast) – Mad Dog American (2000)
- Teddy Andreadis – Innocent Loser (2000)
- David Glen Eisley – Stranger from the Past (2000)
- Atsuki Yokozeki Project – Raid (2001)
- Katt Lowe and the Othersyde (2001)
- Luminosity (2001)
- Milkweed (2001)
- A Tribute To Blondie (various artists) (2001)
- Essential Metal Masters (2001)
- Katt Lowe – Katt Lowe and the Othersyde (2001)
- A Tribute To Limp Bizkit – Mutated .. Manipulated .. Translated (2002)
- Ephesians Project (2002)
- Freddy Cannon – Have A Boom Boom Christmas (2002)
- A Tribute To Bruce Springsteen – Made In The USA (2002)
- Impellitteri – The Very Best of Impellitteri: Faster Than the Speed of Light (2002)
- Catena (2003)
- David Glenn Eisley – The Lost Tapes (2003)
- Hedeki – Drunk Punk (2003)
- Jeff Eaton – Wish You Were Here (2003)
- Kevin Gales – I Didn't Count On This (2003)
- Maskless (with Raven James) (2003)
- Paul Shortino – Sacred Place (2003)
- Broby – Hard to Kill (2004)
- Audrey Forrest (2004)
- Matt Sorum – Hollywood Zen (2004)
- Mr. Big – Greatest Hits (2004)
- Mr. Big – Influences and Connections (2004)
- Chris Catena – Freak Out (2004)
- Numbers of The Beast – A Tribute To Iron Maiden (2004)
- James Christian- Meet the Man (2004)
- Hollywood Rocks! (2004) (Audio companion to Hollywood Rocks: The Ultimate Guide to the 1980's Hollywood, California Rock-N-Roll Music Scene)
- Cypress Thrill (2004)
- Rock vs. Rap (2004)
- Michael Schenker – Heavy Hitters (2005)
- Bad Moon Rising – Full Moon Collection (2005)
- Odd Man Out – Greatest Hits (2005)
- Stephen Pearcy – Stripped (2006)
- Travers and Appice – Bazooka (2006)
- Can You Rock? Sing and Play the Songs of [Led Zeppelin (2006)
- A Tribute to Thin Lizzy (2006)
- Pat Travers – Superstition (2006)
- Out of Ruin – What I Can't See (2007)
- Southern Rock Tribute to Gretchen Wilson (2007)
- Chris Catena – Booze, Brawds and Rockin Hard (2007)
- Saints of the Underground (with Jani Lane)- Love the Sin, Hate the Sinner (2008)
- Adrian Gaylsh – Earth Tones (2008)
- Northern Lights – Spirit of Christmas (2009)
- I Feel Free: Eric Clapton Salute (2009)
- Northern Lights – Celebrate Christmas (2010)
- KUNI – KUNI ROCK (2011)
- Keep Calm And Salute Queen (2015)
- Northern Light Orchestra – Star of the East (2017)
- Bob Kulick – Skeletons in the Closet (2017)
- David Glen Eisley & Craig Goldy – Blood Guts & Games (2017)
- Chris Catena's Rock City Tribe – Truth in Unity (2020)
- Chuck Wright's Sheltering Sky – Self-titled (2022)
