= Cartesian Dreams =

Studio album by House of Lords
- Released: September 18, 2009
- Genre: Hard rock, Glam metal
- Length: 51:42
- Label: Frontiers
- Producer: James Christian, Jeff Kent

House of Lords chronology
Anthology (2008)	Cartesian Dreams (2009)	Big Money (2011)

Professional ratings
Review scores
Source	Rating
Allmusic	3/5 stars
Hard Rock Hideout	7.5/10 stars

Cartesian Dreams is the seventh studio album by the rock band House of Lords. It was released on September 18, 2009 in Europe and October 13, 2009 in the US.

The album features the same line-up as the previous albums World Upside Down and Come to My Kingdom, except new bassist Matt McKenna, and was produced by singer James Christian and Jeff Kent with Tommy Denander as co producer on a couple of songs he co wrote.

== Track listing ==
1. "Cartesian Dreams" - 5:15
2. "Born to Be Your Baby" - 4:31
3. "Desert Rain" - 5:08
4. "Sweet September" (Christian/Denander/Reed/Baker) - 3:45
5. "Bangin'" - 3:32
6. "A Simple Plan" - 4:25
7. "Never Never Look Back" (Christian/Denander/Baker)- 4:06
8. "The Bigger They Come" - 3:53
9. "Repo Man" - 4:11
10. "Saved By Rock" - 4:45
11. "Joanna" - 3:30
12. "The Train" (European Bonus track) / "Who" (Japanese bonus track)- 4:41

== Personnel ==
- James Christian - lead vocals, keyboards
- Jimi Bell - guitar
- Matt McKenna - bass, backing vocals
- B.J. Zampa - drums, percussion

Additional musicians

- Tommy Denander - guitar, keyboards, co-production, songwriting

== Release history ==
Country	Date
Europe	September 18, 2009
United States	October 13, 2009
