= Live in the UK (House of Lords album) =

Live album by House of Lords
- Released: 29 January 2007
- Recorded: 26 November 2005 in Nottingham, England
- Genre: Hard rock, glam metal
- Label: Frontiers
- Producer: James Christian

House of Lords chronology
World Upside Down (2006)	Live in the UK (2007)	Come to My Kingdom (2008)

Professional ratings
Review scores
Source	Rating
Metal Temple	link

Live in the UK is the first live album by House of Lords, released on 29 January 2007.

The album was recorded during the band's last tour with the original reunited line up in 2005, on 26 November 2005 in Nottingham, England. It is the band's last recording with the original line-up (excluding keyboardist and founding member Gregg Giuffria who had no part in the 2000 reunion).

== Track listing ==
No.	Title	Writer(s)	Length
1.	"Sahara"	James Christian, Gregg Giuffria, Ken Mary, Chuck Wright	4:54
2.	"Chains of Love"	Giuffria, Mary, Wright, Lanny Cordola, John Purdell	3:25
3.	"Love Don't Lie"	Stan Bush	4:19
4.	"Pleasure Palace"	Giuffria, David Glen Eisley	5:41
5.	"Talkin' Bout Love"	Christian, Giuffria, Tommy Aldridge, Mark Edward Baker, Steve Johnstad	5:07
6.	"The Edge of Your Life"	Cordola, Wright, Bret Aldstadt	5:45
7.	"Mind Trip"	Pat Torpey, Cordola, Wright, Mary	5:33
8.	"All Is Gone"	Cordola, Mary, Torpey, Wright, Wychoff	3:56
9.	"The Rapture"	Cordola, Wright	4:05
10.	"I Wanna Be Loved"	Johnstad, Mandy Meyer	4:07
11.	"Can't Find My Way Home" (Blind Faith cover)	Steve Winwood	5:06
12.	"Slip of the Tongue"	Eisley, Giuffria, Rick Nielsen	4:54
13.	"Havana" (Bonus studio track)	Christian, Giuffria, Tim Pierce, Mark Spiro	3:47

== Personnel ==
- James Christian – lead vocals
- Lanny Cordola – guitar
- Chuck Wright – bass, backing vocals
- Ken Mary – drums, percussion
