= House of Lords (House of Lords album) =

Studio album by House of Lords
- Released: October 18, 1988
- Recorded: 1988 at Oceanway Studios and O'Henry Studios, Los Angeles, CA
- Genre: Hard rock, glam metal
- Length: 44:35
- Label: Simmons Records/RCA
- Producer: Gregg Giuffria, Andy Johns, Gene Simmons

House of Lords chronology
House of Lords (1988)	Sahara (1990)

Professional ratings
Review scores
Source	Rating
Allmusic	4/5 stars

House of Lords is the debut album by House of Lords, a Giuffria spin-off band, featuring keyboardist Gregg Giuffria. It was released in 1988 on Kiss bassist Gene Simmons' own label and distributed by RCA Records. The album reached position No. 78 in The Billboard 200 Chart on February 25, 1989.

Rick Nielsen of Cheap Trick (with whom the band would later tour) co-wrote the song "Slip of the Tongue". Jeff Scott Soto of Talisman can be found on backing vocals throughout the whole album. Many other popular hard rock musicians contributed to the songwriting on the album, including Stan Bush, David Glen Eisley of Giuffria, Mandy Meyer of Asia and Johnny Warman.

== Track listing ==
No.	Title	Writer(s)	Length
1.	"Pleasure Palace"	Gregg Giuffria, David Glen Eisley	6:21
2.	"I Wanna Be Loved"	Mandy Meyer, Steve Johnstad	3:22
3.	"Edge of Your Life"	Lanny Cordola, Chuck Wright, Bret Taylor Aldstadt	5:19
4.	"Lookin' for Strange"	Cordola, Wright, Giuffria, James Christian	4:03
5.	"Love Don't Lie"	Stan Bush	4:19
6.	"Slip of the Tongue"	Giuffria, Eisley, Rick Nielsen	3:30
7.	"Hearts of the World"	Giuffria, Cordola, Wright	4:17
8.	"Under Blue Skies"	Giuffria, Eisley, Johnny Warman	4:36
9.	"Call My Name"	Giuffria, Wright, Christian, Cordola	4:04
10.	"Jealous Heart"	Giuffria, Eisley, David Roberts	4:38

2000 re-issue bonus tracks
No.	Title	Writer(s)	Length
11.	"Love Don't Lie" (Remix)	Bush	3:37

== Personnel ==
=== Band members ===
- Gregg Giuffria - keyboards, Producer
- James Christian - lead vocals
- Lanny Cordola - guitars
- Chuck Wright - bass
- Ken Mary - drums, percussion

=== Additional musicians ===
- Jeff Scott Soto - backing vocals

=== Production ===
- Gregg Giuffria - producer
- Andy Johns - producer
- Bill Freesh - engineer
- Howie Weinberg - mastering
- Gene Simmons - executive producer
