= Sahara (House of Lords album) =

Studio album by House of Lords
- Released: August 21, 1990
- Recorded: Cherokee Studios, O'Henry Studios, A&M Studios, Sound City, Amigo Studios, Los Angeles, California, 1990
- Genre: Glam metal
- Length: 44:30
- Label: Simmons/RCA/BMG Music
- Producer: Andy Johns, Gregg Giuffria, Gene Simmons

House of Lords chronology
House of Lords (1988)	Sahara (1990)	Demons Down (1992)

Singles from Sahara
- 1. "Can't Find My Way Home" Released: 1990; 2. "Remember My Name" Released: 1990; 3. "Heart on the Line" Released: 1991

Professional ratings
Review scores
Source	Rating
Allmusic	2.5/5 stars

Sahara is the second studio album by the American rock band House of Lords, released on August 21, 1990.

The album was recorded without original guitarist Lanny Cordola, but with Doug Aldrich as the band's guitarist. Still, the album features many guest contributors on guitar, such as Rick Nielsen (Cheap Trick), Chris Impellitteri (Impellitteri) and Mandy Meyer (Asia, Krokus). Other contributors on the albums are White Lion's Mike Tramp, Cheap Trick's Robin Zander, Steeler's Ron Keel, Autograph's Steve Plunkett and Giuffria's David Glen Eisley, all on backing vocals.

The album reached position No. 121 in The Billboard 200 chart on February 23, 1991.

"Heart on the Line", which was written by Cheap Trick guitarist Rick Nielsen, would eventually be recorded by Cheap Trick themselves for their 2016 album Bang, Zoom, Crazy... Hello.

== Track listing ==
No.	Title	Writer(s)	Length
1.	"Shoot"	Ken Mary, James Christian, Chuck Wright, Gregg Giuffria	5:03
2.	"Chains of Love"	Christian, Lanny Cordola, John Purdell, Wright, Mary, Giuffria	3:28
3.	"Can't Find My Way Home" (Blind Faith cover)	Steve Winwood	4:53
4.	"Heart on the Line"	Rick Nielsen	4:00
5.	"Laydown Staydown"	Mary, Christian, Wright, Giuffria	4:00
6.	"Sahara"	Mary, Christian, Wright, Giuffria	5:38
7.	"It Ain't Love"	Mary, Christian, Wright, Giuffria	4:10
8.	"Remember My Name"	Nick Graham, Bob Mitchell	4:58
9.	"American Babylon"	Wright, Cordola, Christian, Mary, Giuffria	4:29
10.	"Kiss of Fire"	Mary, Christian, Wright, Giuffria	3:27

1999 re-issue bonus tracks
No.	Title	Writer(s)	Length
11.	"Can't Find My Way Home" (Blind Faith cover, short version)	Winwood

== Personnel ==
- James Christian – lead vocals, additional guitars
- Gregg Giuffria – keyboards, backing vocals
- Michael Guy – guitars, backing vocals
- Chuck Wright – bass, backing vocals
- Ken Mary – drums, percussion

=== Additional musicians ===
- Doug Aldrich – guitars, backing vocals
- Rick Nielsen – lead guitar and backing vocals on "Heart on the Line"
- Chris Impellitteri – opening guitar solo on "Sahara"
- Mandy Meyer – guitar
- Mike Tramp – backing vocals
- Robin Zander – backing vocals on "Heart on the Line"
- David Glen Eisley – backing vocals
- Steve Plunkett – backing vocals
- Ron Keel – backing vocals
- Nick Graham – keyboards/programming on "Remember My Name"
- Steve Isham – backing vocals
- S.S. Priest – backing vocals
- Billy Dior – backing vocals
- Robbie Snow – backing vocals
- Cheri Martin – backing vocals
- Melony Barnet – backing vocals
- Bruce Flohr – backing vocals
- David Sluts – backing vocals
- Shannon Wolak – backing vocals
- Margie Rist – backing vocals
- Erin Perry – backing vocals
- Kimberly Gold – backing vocals
- Aina Olson – backing vocals
- Breta Troyer – backing vocals
