= Lay It on Me =

Lay It on Me may refer to:

- "Lay It on Me" (Kelly Rowland song), 2011
- "Lay It on Me" (Ina Wroldsen and Broiler song), 2016
- "Lay It on Me" (Vance Joy song), 2017
- "Lay It on Me" (EP), 2020 EP by Nick Lowe
- "Lay It on Me", a 1970 song by The Bee Gees
- "Lay It on Me", a 2014 song by Dylan Scott
- "Lay It on Me", a 2017 song by Kasbo and Keiynan Lonsdale

== See also ==
- Lay It All on Me
