= Arc Angel =

Arc Angel may refer to:

- Arc Angel (band), an AOR rock band
- Arc Angel (album), an album by Arc Angel

== See also ==
- Arc Angels, a Texas blues band
- Archangel
