= Big Bang (Magdallan album) =

Studio album by Magdallan
- Released: 1992
- Recorded: 1990–1992
- Genre: Hard rock, heavy metal
- Length: 56:20
- Label: Intense Records
- Producer: Ken Tamplin, Lanny Cordola, Mick Guzouski

Magdallan chronology
Big Bang (1992)	Revolution Mind (1993)

Big Bang is the debut album by the American metal band Magdallan, released in 1992 through Intense Records. Big Bang was nominated for one GMA Dove Award for Best Metal/Hard Rock Album in 1992, but did not win.

== Track listing ==
All tracks are written by Ken Tamplin & Lanny Cordola.

No.	Title	Length
1.	"End of the Ages"	6:13
2.	"Radio Bikini"	4:41
3.	"Shake"	3:50
4.	"Wounded Hearts"	5:34
5.	"Love to the Rescue"	5:08
6.	"Old Hard Line"	4:31
7.	"Dome of the Rock"	4:48
8.	"Big Bang"	4:50
9.	"House of Dreams"	4:27
10.	"Cry Just a Little"	4:57
11.	"Heartbreak Woman"	4:09
12.	"This One's 4U"	2:45
13.	"End of the Ages" (Reprise)	0:35
Total length:		56:20

Japanese edition bonus tracks
No.	Title	Length
14.	"Sail Away (It's Jal)"	3:05
15.	"Little Liar (Luci)"	4:17

== Personnel ==
- Ken Tamplin - lead & backing vocals
- Lanny Cordola - lead, rhythm & acoustic guitars, sitar on "Wounded Hearts", "Dome of the Rock" & "Big Bang", mandolin on "Old Hard Line"
- Ken Mary - drums

=== Additional personnel ===
- Brian Bromberg - bass
- Kim Bullard - keyboards
- James Christian - backing vocals on "Radio Bikini" & "Big Bang"
- Mark Stein - backing vocals on "Radio Bikini"
- The Peaches Trio - backing vocals on "Shake", "Old Hard Line" & "House of Dreams"
