= Saints of the Underground =

American hard rock band

- Origin: Los Angeles, California, U.S.
- Genres: Hard rock, heavy metal
- Years active: 2006–2011
- Label: Warrior Records
- Past members: Jani Lane; Keri Kelli; Bobby Blotzer; Chuck Wright; Robbie Crane

Saints of The Underground was an American hard rock supergroup formed in 2006 by Ratt drummer Bobby Blotzer and former Alice Cooper guitarist Keri Kelli, who recruited ex-Warrant singer Jani Lane and House of Lords bassist Chuck Wright.

== History ==
The band's formation happened quite unexpectedly. The four musicians were playing cover tunes together for fun during off times from their respective groups. They so enjoyed their chemistry that the band naturally evolved into a creative partnership through which original songs began to emerge. The band was originally called "Angel City Outlaws" when they posted their first two promo singles, "Bruised" and "Exit", along with a third song, "Serial Killer", which wasn't included on the band's first album as it was written for an Alice Cooper project.

The band's studio album Love the Sin, Hate the Sinner (2008) was recorded in Bobby Blotzer's studio (bass and drums) and Keri Kelli's studio (guitars and vocals), and produced by Kelli and Blotzer with Jani Lane and Chuck Wright. It was mixed by producer-engineer Andy Johns, who worked with such bands as The Rolling Stones and Led Zeppelin.

After the CD's release and live performances with Robbie Crane on bass guitar, Jani Lane returned to Warrant as lead vocalist, and toured briefly with the band until departing again in the end of summer 2008. Keri Kelli returned to touring with Alice Cooper while Bobby Blotzer and Robbie Crane were touring with their band, Ratt. Chuck Wright, working with Quiet Riot at the time, opted to leave the touring bass position to friend Robbie Crane as Wright continued with Quiet Riot and his acoustic band, Acoustic Saints.

On August 11, 2011, Jani Lane was found dead in a hotel room in Woodland Hills, California, and Saints Of The Underground disbanded.

== Members ==
- Jani Lane – lead vocals (2006–2011)
- Keri Kelli – guitar (2006–2011)
- Bobby Blotzer – drums (2006–2011)
- Chuck Wright – bass (2006–2008)
- Robbie Crane – bass (2008–2011)

== Discography ==
- Love the Sin, Hate the Sinner (2008) – Warrior Records
