= Giuffria (album) =

Studio album by Giuffria
- Released: November 12, 1984
- Recorded: Summer 1984
- Studio: A&M Studios, One On One Studios, Sound Arts Recording Studio, Record Plant
- Genre: AOR
- Length: 45:28
- Label: MCA
- Producer: Andy Johns, Gregg Giuffria, Lee DiCarlo (associate producer)

Giuffria chronology
Giuffria (1984)	Silk + Steel (1986)

Professional ratings
Review scores
Source	Rating
Allmusic	link

Giuffria is the debut album from American rock band Giuffria (led by keyboard player Gregg Giuffria), released on MCA Records in 1984, and co-produced by Andy Johns. The album peaked at #26 on the Billboard album charts on March 2, 1985. It was the most successful album from the five released by Giuffria, then House of Lords, from 1984 to 1992. The debut single from the album, "Call to the Heart" reached the top 15 on the Billboard Hot 100.

== Track listing ==
- All songs written by Gregg Giuffria and David Glen Eisley, except where noted.
1. "Do Me Right" 4:12
2. "Call to the Heart" 4:37
3. "Don't Tear Me Down" (Giuffria, Eisley, Craig Goldy) 4:54
4. "Dance" (Giuffria, Eisley, Goldy) 4:08
5. "Lonely in Love" 4:53
6. "Trouble Again" 5:24
7. "Turn Me On" (Giuffria, Eisley, Goldy) 4:25
8. "Line of Fire" 4:56
9. "The Awakening" 2:34
10. "Out of the Blue" 5:32

== Personnel ==
=== Giuffria ===
- Gregg Giuffria – keyboards, backing vocals
- Craig Goldy – guitars
- David Glen Eisley – lead vocals, harmonica
- Chuck Wright – bass
- Alan Krigger – drums, percussion

=== Additional musicians ===
- Rick Bozzo (Former bassist for Sabu)
- Jim Cypherd - Fairlight CMI programming
- Phil Jost - programming

=== Production ===
- Produced By: Gregg Giuffria
- Engineered by: Andy Johns, with assistance by Jim Scott
- Mixing: Andy Johns, Gregg Giuffria
- Mastering: Brian Gardner
- All songs published by Herd of Birds Music Inc./Greg Giuffria Music/Kid Bird Music/Frozen Flame Music, except 3, 4 and 7 (Herd of Birds Music/Greg Giuffria Music/Kid Bird Music/Frozen Flame Music/Sgt. Goldy Music).

== Chart performance ==
The album spent 29 weeks on the U.S. Billboard album charts and reached its peak position of #26 in early March 1985.
