= James Christian =

American musician

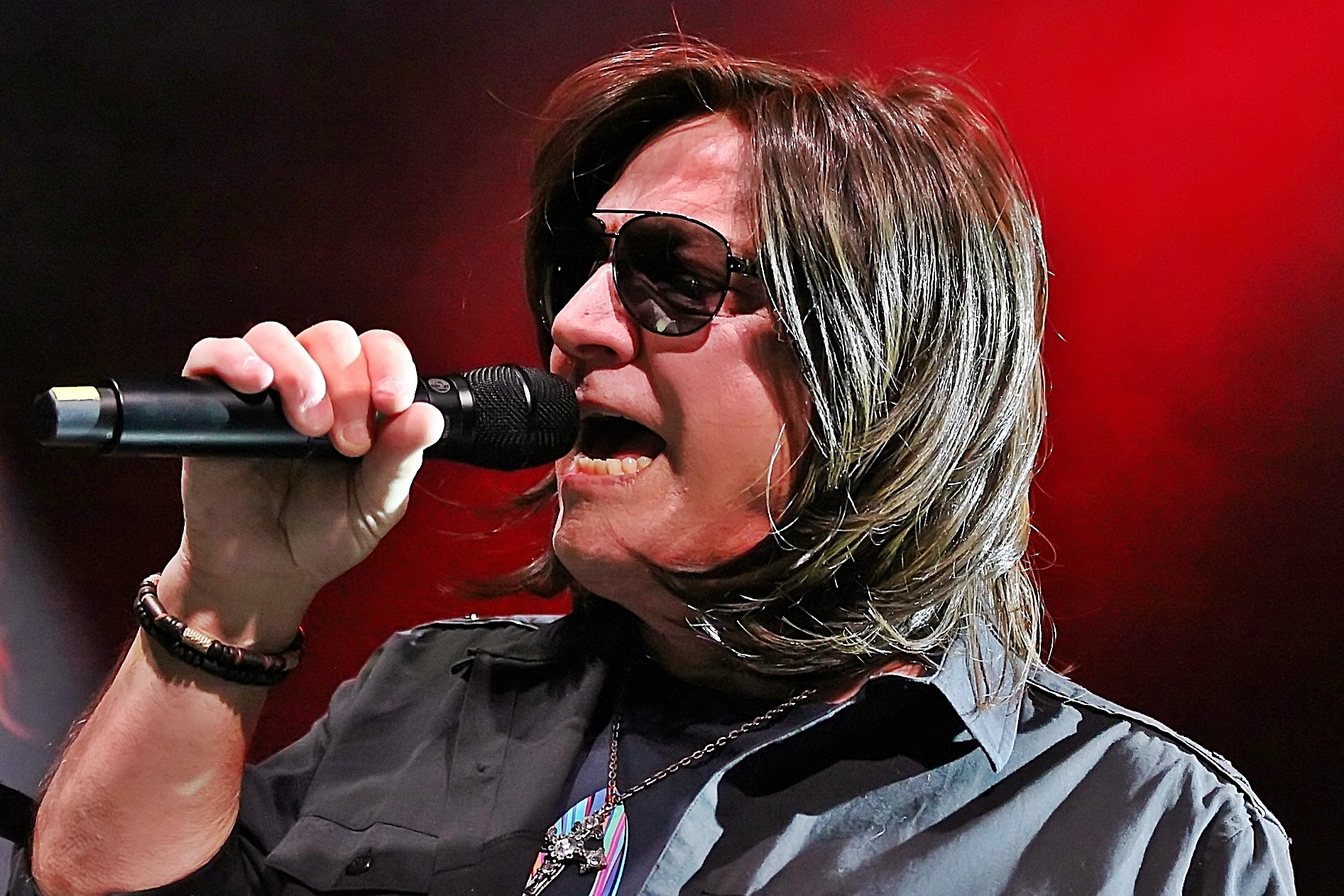
- Christian in 2018

Background information
- Born: James John DeiCicchi; September 21, 1953 (age 73); Milford, Connecticut, U.S.
- Genres: Hard rock, progressive rock, glam metal, art rock, pop rock
- Occupation: Musician
- Instruments: Vocals, guitar, bass, keyboards
- Years active: 1970–present
- Website: http://www.jameschristianmusic.com/

James Christian is an American musician and songwriter who is perhaps best known for being the frontman of the band House of Lords.

== Career ==
Christian began his musical career in the early 1970s, playing for various bands in the Connecticut club circuit, until being recruited by Jasper Wrath. By 1977, they released two albums for MGM Records before disbanding. Christian and some of his bandmates from Jasper Wrath then formed the band Eyes. In 1978, Eyes release the album, We're In It Together, which spawned a single he penned called "Candle in the Window." The single was so successful that he was invited by composer Judithe Randall to come to Los Angeles. After meeting Paul McCartney and Wings guitarist Laurence Juber among others, Christian decided to stay in California.

In 1987, he auditioned to join Quiet Riot after Kevin DuBrow left, but lost the position to Paul Shortino. He eventually joined the band LA Rocks. When their bassist left and was replaced by Chuck Wright, Wright introduced Christian to Gregg Giuffria. After a meeting with Gene Simmons, Christian replaced David Glen Eisley and the new group called House of Lords were born from the ashes of Giuffria.

In 1993, House of Lords disbanded after three albums and Christian received an offer to join Manic Eden, but turned it down. After singing on Pata's self-titled album, he joined Tommy Aldridge and Tim Bogert on a November 1993 tour of Japan backing the guitarist. Christian's solo album, Rude Awakening, was released in 1995. After touring in support of the album, Christian went on a hiatus.

In 2004, Christian returned to music, balancing his solo career and House of Lords.

== Personal life ==
He is married to Robin Beck. They married in 1996 and have a daughter named Olivia (born 1997).

== Discography ==
=== Studio albums ===
- Rude Awakening (1995) (reissued 1998)
- Meet the Man (2004)
- Lay It All on Me (2013)
- Craving (2018)

=== with Jasper Wrath ===
- Zoldar & Clark (1977)
- Anthology: 1969–1976 (1996)

=== with Eyes ===
- We're in It Together (1978)

=== with House of Lords ===
- House of Lords (1988)
- Sahara (1990)
- Demons Down (1992)
- The Power and the Myth (2004)
- World Upside Down (2006)
- Come to My Kingdom (2008)
- Cartesian Dreams (2009)
- Big Money (2011)
- Precious Metal (2014)
- Indestructible (2015)
- Saint of the Lost Souls (2017)
- New World – New Eyes (2020)
- Saints & Sinners (2022)
- Full Tilt Overdrive (2024)

=== Guest appearances ===
- Tim Feehan – Full Contact (1990)
- Lanny Cordola – Electric Warrior and Acoustic Saint (lead vocals "Shadows Over My Heart" and "Summertime") (1992)
- Magdallan – Big Bang (1992)
- Pata – Pata (1993)
- Impellitteri – Answer to the Master (1994)
- Robin Beck – Wonderland (2003) (Producer)
- Robin Beck – Livin' on a Dream (2007) (co-producer)
- Voices of Rock MMVII (2007) (Lead vocal on Voodoo Woman)
- Ranfa - "Little hard blues" (2007) Duet vocalist in track "Little hard blues"
- Moonstone Project – Rebel on the Run (2009) (Lead vocals on all but one track)
- Alias – Never Say Never (2009) (background vocals)
- Robin Beck – The Great Escape (2011) (Producer and duet vocalist Till The End Of Time)
- Fiona – Unbroken (2011) (Producer)
- From Tom Galley The Creator of Phenomena - Awakening (2012) (Lead vocals on track 4)
