= Silk and Steel =

Silk and Steel may refer to:

- Silk + Steel, a 1986 album by Giuffria
- Silk & Steel, an album by Five Star
- A type of guitar string made by several manufacturers for acoustic steel string guitars. They are overwound steel strings with silk filaments running under the winding.
