= Lay It All on Me =

Lay It All on Me may refer to:

- Lay It All on Me (album), a 2013 album by James Christian
- "Lay It All on Me" (song), a 2015 single by Rudimental featuring Ed Sheeran
- "Lay It All on Me", song by Big & Rich from Hillbilly Jedi
- "Lay It All on Me", song by Blackberry Smoke from Holding All the Roses
- "Lay It All on Me", song by the Black Crowes from Lions
- "Lay It All on Me", song by the Swon Brothers from Set List
- "Lay It All on Me", 2010 song by Willie Mack

== See also ==
- Lay It on Me
