= Stand in Line =

Studio album by Impellitteri
- Released: 1988
- Studios: Record Plant Studios, Cherokee Studios, Los Angeles; Sound City Studios, Van Nuys; TMF Recording Studios, New York City
- Genre: Heavy metal
- Length: 35:15
- Label: Relativity
- Producers: Chris Impellitteri, Cliff Cultreri

Impellitteri chronology
Impellitteri (1987)	Stand in Line (1988)	Live in Tokyo 1988 (1988)

Alternative cover
- 2009 remastered edition

Stand in Line is the first studio album by heavy metal band Impellitteri, released in 1988 through Relativity Records; a remastered edition was issued on May 19, 2009, through EMI Records, containing four bonus tracks which originally formed their 1987 EP Impellitteri. The album reached number 91 on the U.S. Billboard 200 and remained on that chart for twenty weeks.

After recording the album, bassist Chuck Wright (who left to form House of Lords) and drummer Pat Torpey (who left to form Mr. Big) were replaced for the supporting tour and videos by bassist Dave Spitz and drummer Stet Howland.

== Critical reception ==
Professional ratings
Review scores
Source	Rating
AllMusic	4/5 stars
Rock Hard	7.5/10

Whitney Z. Gomes at AllMusic awarded Stand in Line four stars out of five, listing "Secret Lover", "Tonight I Fly", "Goodnight and Goodbye" and the title track as highlights. He mainly praised singer Graham Bonnet's vocals throughout the album, but heavily criticized the guitarist and bandleader Chris Impellitteri's cover versions of "Since You Been Gone" and "Over the Rainbow" as "excessive and useless", writing that they "almost [run] the record into the ground". Further criticism was directed at the album's mixing and production, but he concluded by saying, "When Stand in Line works, it rules."

== Track listing ==
No.	Title	Lyrics	Music	Length
1.	"Stand in Line"	Graham Bonnet	Chris Impellitteri	4:34
2.	"Since You've Been Gone" (Russ Ballard cover; based on the version by Rainbow)	Russ Ballard	Ballard	3:58
3.	"Secret Lover"	Bonnet	Impellitteri	3:26
4.	"Somewhere Over the Rainbow" (Judy Garland cover)	(instrumental)	Harold Arlen	5:22
5.	"Tonight I Fly"	Bonnet	Impellitteri	3:51
6.	"White and Perfect"	Bonnet	Impellitteri, Bonnet, Chuck Wright, Pat Torpey	4:23
7.	"Leviathan"	Bonnet	Impellitteri, Bonnet, Wright, Torpey	3:51
8.	"Goodnight and Goodbye"	Bonnet	Impellitteri	3:12
9.	"Playing with Fire"	(instrumental)	Impellitteri	2:38
Total length:				35:15

2009 remastered edition bonus tracks
No.	Title	Lyrics	Music	Length
10.	"Lost in the Rain"	Rob Rock	Impellitteri	2:57
11.	"Play with Fire"	Rock	Impellitteri	3:20
12.	"Burning"	Rock	Impellitteri	3:05
13.	"I'll Be Searching"	Rock	Impellitteri	3:53

== Personnel ==
- Chris Impellitteri – guitar, bass intro (track 3; uncredited)
- Graham Bonnet – vocals
- Phil Wolfe – keyboard
- Pat Torpey – drums
- Chuck Wright – bass (except tracks 2–3)

=== Additional personnel ===
- Randy Rand – bass (tracks 2–3; uncredited)

=== Technical personnel ===
- Chris Impellitteri – producer
- Bill Freesh – engineering, mixing
- Mikey Davis – engineering
- Brian Jenkins – engineering assistance
- Paul Winger – engineering assistance
- Bob Ludwig – mastering
- Cliff Cultreri – executive production

== Chart performance ==
Year	Chart	Position
1988	Billboard 200	91
