= Jasper Wrath =

Progressive rock band

- Origin: New Haven, Connecticut, United States
- Genres: Art rock, symphonic rock, progressive rock
- Years active: 1969-1971, 1973-1976
- Labels: MGM
- Past members: Jeff Cannata; Michael Soldan; Phil Stone; Robert Gianotti; James Christian; Scott Zito; Jeff Batter

Jasper Wrath was a progressive rock band from New Haven, Connecticut, that was active throughout the 1970s. They were founded by Jeff Cannata, who would later go on to form the 1980s band Arc Angel. The band also featured James Christian, who would later go on to front the notable glam metal band House of Lords.

== History ==
Jasper Wrath formed in New Haven, Connecticut, in 1969. The original lineup consisted of drummer Jeff Cannata of New Haven power trio band Christopher Hawke, as well as keyboardist Michael Soldan, guitarist Robert Giannotti, and bassist Phil Stone from the Connecticut-based band Buckle. Promoter John DuBuque recalls, "I had booked Christopher Hawke for an outdoor show in Milford. In true agency form, another group showed up, Jasper Wrath. I believe it was their first gig. Although upset, I knew, once they started playing, I had never heard or seen anything like this before around here." Uninterested in doing cover material, the band wrote a handful of songs in the next six to eight months and sent a few demos to record companies in New York and Los Angeles. Within a couple of weeks, interest from LA based MGM Records prompted a call to set up a live showcase with their New York office. Weeks later, contracts were negotiated and Jasper Wrath had their first record deal. Their first album was recorded in six weeks at Phil Ramone’s A&R Studio in New York; Wrath was on its way. The self-titled debut was released in 1971.

Just as a national tour was being scheduled, Giannotti left the band. After months of searching for the right replacement, without any luck, the band temporarily split. Cannata and Soldan, influenced by the British progressive art rock scene at the time, decided to move to London, England to explore the musical possibilities there. In time, and due to complications in obtaining British work permits, they took a holiday in Majorca, Spain, co-writing some of Jasper Wrath’s most memorable compositions, i.e.: "You", "The Dream", "Somewhere Beyond The Sun", "The City", "Touch The Sky", and "The Ghost of Way". While at a Yes concert at The Palace Theater in Waterbury in the early 70’s, Cannata and Soldan approached Rick Wakeman pre-show backstage and asked about the then-mysterious Mellotron. Wakeman revealed to them, "There are only three in the world. King Crimson has one, The Moody Blues and Yes, and the cost is around $16,000, if you can even get one”. Questioning the legitimacy of that statement, while in London Cannata and Soldan found and purchased the elusive mellotron for a mere 700 Pounds and had it sent back to the States. Now the band had the orchestral sound that they were looking for.

After returning to Connecticut, the band set out to find the right chemistry of players to perform the material live. To augment the sound, Phil Stone learned how to play the flute along with bass. Cannata then recruited James Christian from local band HOOKA as their new frontman on lead vocals and guitar. Scott Zito was added to the band on lead guitar, but left after a couple of years. Jeff Batter, who had been classically trained since the age of four, was later added as the group's second keyboardist. It was during this period in the mid-1970s that Jasper Wrath scored a regional No. 1 hit with the song "You". The band quickly became one of the most popular live acts in the area.

Unfortunately, due to commercial and non-commercial musical differences, the members of Jasper Wrath went their separate ways in 1976. James Christian, Phil Stone, and Jeff Batter went on to form another popular Connecticut band, Eyes, before Christian went on to front the notable glam metal band House of Lords. Jeff Cannata and Michael Soldan later formed the band Arc Angel, before Cannata started a solo career. Scott Zito went on to record albums with artists such as Grace Slick and Michael Bolton. He even wrote most of the songs on Grace Slick's 1981 album Welcome to the Wrecking Ball!, which also featured Phil Stone on bass. Dellwood Records released two albums of previously unreleased Jasper Wrath studio material in 1977. Unfortunately, Dellwood released the albums under two fake band names. One was called "Coming Home" and was credited to Arden House, while the other was marketed as the debut album of Zoldar & Clark. Neither album received much exposure. In 1996, Jeff Cannata put together and released a two-disc anthology of Jasper Wrath material. The set included material from the original debut LP, the "You/General Gunther" single, material from the fake Arden House and Zoldar & Clark albums, and previously unreleased live material. Jasper Wrath had a one-off reunion performance for the Act One Entertainments 50th Anniversary Concert in New Haven on June 13, 2010. The performance featured original members Jeff Cannata, Robert Gianotti, Michael Soldan, and Jeff Batter, as well two new musicians filling in on guitar and bass.

== Band members ==
- Jeff Cannata - drums, percussion, guitar, woodwinds, vocals (1969–1971, 1973-1976)
- Michael Soldan - keyboards, vocals (1969–1971, 1973-1976)
- Phil Stone - bass, flute, vocals (1969–1971, 1973-1976)
- Robert Gianotti - guitar, flute, vocals (1969–1971)
- James Christian - lead vocals, guitar (1973–1976)
- Scott Zito - guitar, keyboards, vocals (1973–1974)
- Jeff Batter - keyboards, vocals (1973–1976)

== Discography ==
=== Studio albums ===
- Jasper Wrath (1971)
- Coming Back (1977) as Arden House
- Zoldar & Clark (1977) as Zoldar & Clark

=== Compilation albums ===
- Anthology: 1969-1976 (1996)

=== Singles ===
- "You" / "General Gunther" (1975)
