= Heart on the Line =

Heart on the Line may refer to:

- "Heart on the Line", a 1990 song by House of Lords from Sahara
- "Heart on the Line", a 1989 song by Richard Marx from Repeat Offender
