= Shout (band) =

American rock band

- Origin: Costa Mesa, California, U.S.
- Genres: Rock, hard rock, Christian metal
- Years active: 1987–1989, 1999 (Reunion: 2012, 2024)
- Labels: Frontline, Intense
- Past members: Loren Robinson; Ken Tamplin; Chuck King; Joseph Galletta; Dennis Holt; Mark Hugonberger; Roger Mielke

Shout was an American rock band formed in 1987 by Ken Tamplin. Musically, the band was similar to Journey and Styx, with the Encyclopedia of Contemporary Christian Music describing them as "more competent than Stryper". Cornerstone magazine wrote that Shout was more straightforward than other Christian metal bands such as Bloodgood. The band garnered a Dove Award after their breakup in 1989.

== History ==
Their first album, It Won't Be Long, was recorded by session musicians. These included Lanny Cordola (Magdalen), Marty Friedman (Megadeth), Michael Angelo (Nitro), Joseph Galletta, Loren Robinson, Dennis Holt (AD), and others. The album was an instant hit, and the band played at London's famed Marquee in August 1988. Following this release Tamplin hired Galletta and Robinson, who he had played with in Joshua, on a full-time basis. These three members would form the long term core of the band. Chuck King (Idle Cure) also became an integral part of the band. The band achieved early success in Europe and toured there in August 1988.

Their second album, In Your Face, sold 40,000 copies within a month of its release. The album was said to express "every nuance and shade of loudness and fastness". At that time the band became widely successful, selling out shows at the Roxy Theatre. The lead single, "In Your Face", won the Dove Award for recorded metal song of the year in 1990.

The band dissolved in 1989 due to primarily two issues: the "inability of Christian music to financially support artists" and a lawsuit over naming rights, where Tamplin was held to have the right to record under the name Shout, but an East Coast band had the right to perform with it. Tamplin went on to pursue a solo career. Two compilations were issued before Tamplin reformed the band. New material was issued in their 1999 release, Shout Back.

== Discography ==
- 1987: It Won't Be Long (Frontline Records, Review: CCM Magazine, Cornerstone)
- 1989: In Your Face (Frontline in USA, Music For Nations in GB, Fun House in Japan, Review:CCM Magazine)
- 1992: At the Top of Their Lungs (Intense Records, Compilation)
- 1999: It Won't Be Long/In Your Face (KMG Records, Review: Cross Rhythms)
- 1999: Shout Back (Indie: Nippon Crown Records in Japan, Z Records in GB)

=== Singles ===
- "It Won't Be Long" / "Timeless Love" (1988)
- "Showdown" / "Find a Way" (1989)

== Members ==
- Loren Robinson – bass
- Ken Tamplin – guitar, vocals
- Chuck King – guitar, vocals
- Joseph Galletta – drums
- Dennis Holt – drums
- Mark Hugonberger – keyboard
- Roger Mielke – keyboard

== Guest musicians ==
- Lanny Cordola – guitar
- Marty Friedman – guitar
- Randy Hansen – guitar
- Alex Masi – guitar
- Michael Angelo – guitar
- Joey Price – guitar
