= Love the Sin, Hate the Sinner =

Studio album by Saints of the Underground
- Released: April 2, 2008
- Recorded: 2008 at Diamond Recording Studio, Los Angeles, CA;
- Genre: Hard rock, heavy metal
- Length: 36:40
- Label: Warrior/Universal
- Producer: Bobby Blotzer, Keri Kelli, Jani Lane

Love the Sin, Hate the Sinner is the only album of Saints of the Underground, a hard rock supergroup composed of Jani Lane (ex-Warrant), Keri Kelli (ex-Alice Cooper, ex-Warrant, ex-Ratt), Robbie Crane (ex-Ratt) and Bobby Blotzer (ex-Ratt). The album was released on April 22, 2008.

== Background ==
The album was recorded in Bobby Blotzer's studio (for bass and drums) and Keri Kelli's studio (for guitars and vocals), and was produced by Kelli and Blotzer along with Jani Lane. The album was mixed by legendary producer/engineer Andy Johns, who worked with such bands as The Rolling Stones and Led Zeppelin. The album also featured additional bass work by Chuck Wright (Quiet Riot, House of Lords).

The band was originally called Angel City Outlaws when they posted their first two promo singles: "Bruised" and "Exit" along with a third song titled "Serial Killer", which didn't feature on the band's first album because it was written for an Alice Cooper project.

This was the last full album recorded and released featuring Jani Lane, who died on August 11, 2011.

== Track listing ==
1. "Dead Man Shoes" - 2:45
2. "Tomorrow Never Comes" - 3:16
3. "All In How You Wear It" - 4:25
4. "Good Times" - 3:58
5. "Exit" - 2:45
6. "American Girl" (Tom Petty and the Heartbreakers cover) - 3:46
7. "Signs of Life" - 2:59
8. "Bruised" - 3:38
9. "Moonlight Mile" (The Rolling Stones cover)- 5:15
10. "Jimmy" (Warrant cover) - 3:54

== Personnel ==
- Jani Lane - lead vocals
- Keri Kelli - guitars
- Bobby Blotzer - drums
- Robbie Crane - bass

=== Additional musicians ===
- Chuck Wright - bass
- Rick Flores - keyboards
