= Demons Down =

Studio album by House of Lords
- Released: April 7, 1992
- Recorded: 1991–1992
- Genre: Hard rock, glam metal
- Length: 46:24
- Label: PolyGram/Victory Music
- Producer: David Thoener, House of Lords

House of Lords chronology
Sahara (1990)	Demons Down (1992)	The Power and the Myth (2004)

Professional ratings
Review scores
Source	Rating
Allmusic	3/5 stars

Demons Down is the third studio album by House of Lords, released on April 7, 1992.

It was recorded with founding members James Christian and Gregg Giuffria playing with a reformed band line-up, and was the last album before the band's breakup the same year. A poster of the album cover was featured in the Seinfeld episode "The Bubble Boy".

== Track listing ==
No.	Title	Writer(s)	Length
1.	"O Father"	James Christian, Gregg Giuffria, Mark Edward Baker, Bob Marlette	5:54
2.	"Demons Down"	Christian, Giuffria, Baker	3:32
3.	"What's Forever For"	Christian, Giuffria, Baker	4:36
4.	"Talkin' 'Bout Love"	Christian, Giuffria, Baker, Tommy Aldridge, Steve Johnstad	4:46
5.	"Spirit of Love"	Christian, Giuffria, Tim Pierce, Mark Spiro	4:34
6.	"Down, Down, Down"	Christian, Giuffria, Baker, Marlette	4:49
7.	"Metallic Blue"	Christian, Giuffria, Baker, Mike Slamer	5:03
8.	"Inside You"	Christian, Giuffria, Spiro, Alan Pasqua	5:36
9.	"Johnny's Got a Mind of His Own"	Christian, Giuffria, Baker	3:40
10.	"Can't Fight Love"	Christian, Giuffria, Baker, Slamer	3:21

== Personnel ==
- Gregg Giuffria - keyboards, backing vocals
- James Christian - lead vocals
- Dennis Chick - guitars, backing vocals
- Sean McNabb - bass, backing vocals
- Tommy Aldridge - drums, backing vocals

=== Additional musicians ===
- Paul Stanley - backing vocals on "Can’t Fight Love"
- Tim Pierce - guitar
- Danny Jacobs - guitar
- David Glen Eisley - backing vocals
- Billy Trudel - backing vocals
