= Arc Angel (band) =

American band

- Origin: New Haven, Connecticut, United States
- Genres: Rock, Hard rock, AOR
- Years active: 1983; 2002
- Label: Portrait/CBS
- Spinoff of: Jasper Wrath
- Members: Jeff Cannata; Michael Soldan

Arc Angel was an American AOR rock band, that was formed by the musicians Jeff Cannata and Michael Soldan.

== History ==
Jeff Cannata and Michael Soldan had previously been in the popular Connecticut-based band Jasper Wrath. Cannata played drums and Soldan played keyboards; both composed most of the group's songs. After Jasper Wrath's demise in 1976, Cannata and Soldan continued writing songs together. Cannata started working with guitar and keyboards more in order to develop his song writing abilities. In the early 1980s, Cannata and Soldan presented some of their new compositions to the staff at CBS Records. CBS liked what the duo were doing and they signed them to a recording contract. The problem was that there was no live band to perform the songs. Cannata and Soldan got the idea to record the album with a large group of session musicians, similar to The Alan Parsons Project.

The self-titled debut was released in 1983. Jeff Cannata sang lead vocals and played guitar, bass, and drums, while Michael Soldan played keyboards and sang backing vocals. Included on the roster of session musicians were former Jasper Wrath bandmates James Christian and Jeff Batter, as well as keyboardist Jeff Bova and bassist Hugh McDonald. The album became a hit in Europe. A music video for the song "Tragedy" was also filmed and showcased on MTV. The video featured Cannata on lead vocals and guitar, Michael Soldan on keyboards, with local Connecticut band, Cryer, as the backup band. Cryer consisted of Jay Jesse Johnson on guitar, Steve Shore on bass, and Jeff Zajac on drums.

The album did not do well domestically. Arc Angel was dismissed by US critics as a Boston/Kansas clone. Cannata abandoned releasing albums under the Arc Angel name, and began recording solo albums under the name Cannata for a while, starting with 1988's Images Of Forever. In 2002, Jeff Cannata released the album Tamorok, which was credited as a joint effort between Arc Angel and Cannata and also featured Michael Soldan on keyboards.

== Members ==
- Jeff Cannata - Guitar, bass, keyboards, drums, and vocals
- Michael Soldan - Keyboards and vocals

Frequent contributors

- James Christian - Vocals
- Jeff Batter - Keyboards and vocals
- Jay Jesse Johnson - Guitar
- David Coe - Guitar

== Discography ==
- Arc Angel - 1983 (CBS)
- Tamorok - 2002 (Oxford Circus)
- Harlequins of Light - 2013 (Frontiers Records (Italy))
