= Anthology (House of Lords album) =

Compilation album by House of Lords
- Released: October 14, 2008
- Genre: Hard rock, Glam metal
- Label: Cleopatra
- Producer: Ken Mary

House of Lords chronology
Come to My Kingdom (2008)	Anthology (2008)	Cartesian Dreams (2009)

Anthology is a compilation of rare demos and live recordings by House of Lords, released on October 14, 2008.

The album was mixed and produced by the band's original drummer Ken Mary.

== Track listing ==
1. "I Wanna Be Loved" - 3:33
2. "Can't Find My Way Home" (Blind Faith cover) - 4:55
3. "Dangerous Woman" - 4:02
4. "Hold Back the Night" - 4:23
5. "Chains of Love" 3:43
6. "The Legend Lives On" - 4:19
7. "Sahara" - 5:26
8. "Hero's Song" - 4:57
9. "Kiss of Fire" - 2:43
10. "Bad Bones" - 4:24
11. "Beyond the Pale" - 3:53
12. "Lookin' for Strange" (Live 1989) - 4:51
13. "Edge of Your Life" (Live 1989) - 5:02
14. "Lanny's Solo" (Live 1989) - 2:32
15. "Under Blue Skies" (Live 1989) - 4:30
16. "American Babylon" (Live Experimental 1994) - 3:56
