= Come to My Kingdom =

Studio album by House of Lords
- Released: March 17, 2008
- Recorded: 2007–2008
- Genre: Hard rock, glam metal, power metal
- Length: 57:39
- Label: Frontiers/Blistering
- Producer: James Christian, Jeff Kent

House of Lords chronology
Live in the UK (2007)	Come to My Kingdom (2008)	Anthology (2008)

Professional ratings
Review scores
Source	Rating
Metal Temple	4/5 stars
RevelationZ	8/10 stars
Melodic.net	4.5/5 stars
Only Rock	4.5/5 stars

Come to My Kingdom is the sixth studio album by House of Lords, released on March 17, 2008 in Europe and October 7, 2008 in the US.

The album features the same lineup as the previous album World Upside Down and was produced by singer James Christian and Jeff Kent who also co-wrote most all of the album's vocal melodies and lyrics.

== Track listing ==
No.	Title	Writer(s)	Length
1.	"Purgatorio Overture No. 2"	Jeff Kent	1:04
2.	"Come to My Kingdom"	Kent, Jimi Bell	4:19
3.	"I Need to Fly"	Kent, Tommy Denander	4:07
4.	"I Don't Wanna Wait All Night"	Kent, Bell	4:04
5.	"Another Day from Heaven"	Kent, Bell	4:30
6.	"In a Perfect World"	Kent, Bell	3:56
7.	"The Dream"	Kent, Bell	5:18
8.	"One Foot in the Dark"	Kent, Bell	3:38
9.	"Your Every Move"	James Christian, Bell, Chris Pelcer	4:40
10.	"I Believe"	Kent, Denader	3:57
11.	"One Touch"	Kent, Bell	4:13
12.	"Even Love Can't Save Us"	Kent, Bell	4:14
13.	"In the Light"	Kent, Bell	4:37

European bonus tracks
No.	Title	Writer(s)	Length
14.	"Another Day From Heaven (Acoustic Remix)"	Kent, Bell	4:56

Japan bonus tracks
No.	Title	Length
14.	"It Might Have Been Madness"	3:30

== Personnel ==
- James Christian - lead vocals, keyboards
- Jimi Bell - guitar
- Chris McCarvill - bass, backing vocals
- B.J. Zampa - drums, percussion

=== Additional musicians ===
- Robin Beck - backing vocals
- Jeff Kent - All instruments and production on "Purgatorio Overture No. 2", lyrics, vocal melodies and lead vocal phrasing on all tracks except "Your Every Move"
