= Arc Angel (album) =

Studio album by Arc Angel
- Released: 1983
- Genre: Rock, AOR
- Length: 37:04
- Label: Portrait/CBS
- Producer: Jeff Cannata

Arc Angel chronology
Arc Angel (1983)	Tamorok (2002)

Professional ratings
Review scores
Source	Rating
Allmusic	3/5 stars

Arc Angel is the first studio album by Connecticut-based AOR band Arc Angel.

== Track listing ==
Side 1

1. "Stars" - 5:02
2. "Tragedy" - 3:33
3. "Wanted: Dead Or Alive" - 3:28*
4. "Used to Think I'd Never Fall in Love" - 3:51
5. "Rock Me Tonight" - 3:30

Side 2

1. "Before the Storm" - 1:40
2. "Sidelines" - 3:46
3. "Confession" - 3:12
4. "Just Another Romance" - 4:10
5. "King of the Mountain" - 4:45

*"Wanted: Dead or Alive" was recorded by April Wine on their 1985 album Walking Through Fire.

== Personnel ==
- Jeff Cannata - Lead and backing vocals, drums, bass, acoustic and electric guitar
- Michael Soldan - Keyboards and backing vocals
- Scott Spray - Bass
- Kevin Nugent - Guitar solo
- Jim Gregory - Bass
- Jay Jesse Johnson - Lead and rhythm guitar
- James Christian - Backing vocals
- Frank Simms - Backing vocals
- David Coe - Guitar
- Tony Airdo - Backing vocals
- Jeff Batter - Piano
- Jeff Bova - Oberheim
- Doug Katsaros - Piano
- Hugh McDonald - Bass
- Chuck Burgi III - Bass
- Lance Quinn - Electric guitar
- Brent Diamond - Synthesizer
- Lennie Petze - Harmonica
- Jayeanne Sartoretto - Vocals
- David Wolff - Synthesizer
- Bud Vumback - Bass
