= The Power and the Myth =

Studio album by House of Lords
- Released: August 3, 2004
- Recorded: 2002–2004
- Genre: Hard rock, glam metal
- Length: 47:17
- Label: Frontiers
- Producer: House of Lords

House of Lords chronology
Demons Down (1992)	The Power and the Myth (2004)	World Upside Down (2006)

Professional ratings
Review scores
Source	Rating
Allmusic	3/5 stars
Melodic.net	2/5 stars

The Power and the Myth is the fourth studio album and the first since the reunion, by House of Lords, released on August 3, 2004.

The album marks the return of original members Chuck Wright, Lanny Cordola and Ken Mary, but is the first not to feature keyboardist, main songwriter and founding member Gregg Giuffria.

Then Mr. Big drummer Pat Torpey co-wrote many of the songs on the album.

== Track listing ==
1. "Today" (McCubbin, Ross, Domen Vajevec, Martin) – 4:44
2. "All Is Gone" (Ken Mary, Pat Torpey, Wychoff, Lanny Cordola, Chuck Wright) – 3:56
3. "Am I the Only One" (Torpey, Cordola, Wright) – 3:29
4. "Living in Silence" (James Christian, Mary, Torpey, Cordola, Wright) – 5:05
5. "The Power and the Myth" (Mary, Cordola, Wright) – 3:22
6. "The Rapture" (Cordola, Wright) – 3:21
7. "The Man Who I Am" (McCubbin, Ross, Vajevec, Martin) – 4:35
8. "Bitter Sweet Euphoria" (Phil Bardowell, Christian, Mary, Torpey, Cordola, Wright) – 3:57
9. "Mind Trip" (Mary, Torpey, Cordola, Wright) – 5:08
10. "Child of Rage" (Christian, Cordola, Wright) – 5:53
11. "Havana" (Christian, Gregg Giuffria, Tim Pierce, Mark Spiro) [Japanese bonus track] – 3:47

== Personnel ==
- James Christian – lead vocals, guitar
- Lanny Cordola – guitar
- Chuck Wright – bass
- Ken Mary – drums

=== Additional musicians ===
- Derek Sherinian – keyboards
- Ricky Phillips – keyboards
- Allan Okuye – keyboards
- Robin Beck – backing vocals
- Sandra Stevens – backing vocals
