= Magdallan =

American Christian metal supergroup

- Genres: Hard rock, glam metal, Christian rock, Christian metal
- Years active: 1990–1992 (As Magdallan); 1992–1995 (As Magdalen)
- Labels: Intense, Essential
- Past members: Ken Tamplin; Lanny Cordola; Chuck Wright; Ken Mary; Phillip Bardowell

Magdallan (later known as Magdalen), was an American Christian metal collaboration between Ken Tamplin and Lanny Cordola. The band was active from 1990 to 1995, released two albums and an EP, and was signed to Intense Records and Essential Records.

== History ==
The band's original lineup was Ken Tamplin, Lanny Cordola, Brian Bromberg, and Ken Mary. After the first album Ken Tamplin departed and Phillip Bardowell took over vocal duties. Chuck Wright would later replace Bromberg for the Magdalen releases.

Ken Tamplin was well known for his work in Shout. Lanny Cordola, Chuck Wright, Ken Mary were previously well known for being members of the group House of Lords.

=== Big Bang ===
The band's first release, Big Bang, was notable as one of the most expensive Christian albums produced by that time, with a budget reported as being $250,000, and the album faced some criticism for being overproduced. Nevertheless, Big Bang was nominated for one GMA Dove Award for Best Metal/Hard Rock Album in 1992, but did not win.

=== Ken Tamplin's departure ===
After the first album was released, Tamplin left the band. Tamplin commented that he felt the need for a fresh start after he learned that Intense Records had planned to shelve the Big Bang album after two years of hard work. After Tamplin's departure, the studio project of Magdallan was turned into a full band and thus the name was changed from Magdallan to Magdalen.

=== Name change ===
After Ken Tamplin left the band, the name was changed to Magdalen for the second release Revolution Mind and The Dirt EP. In 1999 a compilation album, End of the Age was released under the old name spelling. The significance of the name change is signification of the difference between the studio project and the band. Magdallan is the name of the studio project, and Magdalen is the name of the band that continued after Ken Tamplin's departure.

== Discography ==
=== As Magdallan ===
- Big Bang (1992) Intense Records
- End of the Age (Compilation; 1999) KMG Records
- Revolution Mind (1993) Essential Records
- The Dirt (1995) Intense Records
