= Jeff Cannata =

American drummer

- Genres: Progressive rock, Art rock, Hard rock, AOR
- Occupations: Musician, drummer, guitarist, vocalist, record producer
- Instruments: Drums, guitar, bass, keyboards, woodwinds, vocals

Jeff Cannata is an American, Connecticut-based musician, songwriter, and record producer. Cannata was a founding member and driving force behind the New Haven-based, progressive rock band Jasper Wrath. He was the drummer for the group, however he also sang, played woodwinds, and wrote a majority of the songs on their 1971 self-titled debut album. The band retained a local following and continued touring until they disbanded in 1976.

Cannata formed a new project called Arc Angel in 1983, with former Jasper Wrath bandmate Michael Soldan. The group signed a record deal with CBS Records and released a self-titled debut in 1983. In Arc Angel, Cannata was the frontman as he sang and played guitar. He later made a number of solo albums under the name Cannata. These included Images of Forever (CBS Records, 1988) and Watching the World (1993).

Jeff Cannata produces several local bands in the Connecticut area and manages the independent record label Oxford Circus Records. He released a new album with Arc Angel in 2002, followed by a new solo album, Mysterium Magnum in 2006.

== Discography ==
=== Jasper Wrath ===
- Jasper Wrath (1971)
- You / General Gunther (single) (1975)
- Coming Back (1977) [credited as Arden House]
- Zoldar & Clark (1977) [credited as Zoldar & Clark]
- Anthology: 1969–1976 (1996)

=== Arc Angel ===
- Arc Angel (1983)
- Tamorok (2002)
- Harlequins of Light (2013)

=== Cannata ===
- Images of Forever (1988)
- Watching The World (1993)
- Tamorok (2002)
- Mysterium Magnum (2006)
- My Back Pages: Volume 1 (2009)
