= Chris Impellitteri =

American guitarist

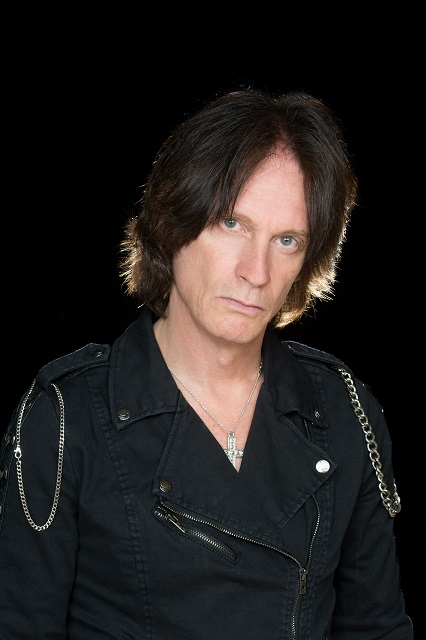
- Chris Impellitteri, 2016 Busan Rock Festival

Background information
- Born: September 25, 1964 (age 61); Connecticut, U.S.
- Genres: Neo-classical metal, heavy metal, speed metal
- Occupation: Guitarist
- Years active: 1983–present
- Labels: Relativity Records, JVC

Chris Impellitteri (born September 25, 1964) is an American guitarist and songwriter, who is the lead guitarist and founder of the heavy metal band Impellitteri.

In 2003, Guitar One Magazine voted Chris Impellitteri the second-fastest guitar shredder of all time. In 2008, Guitar World magazine named him as one of the fastest guitarists of all time. In 2023, Impellitteri was inducted into the Heavy Metal Hall of Fame.

== Biography ==
On The Blairing Out Show, he said that both his parents died by suicide when he was nine years old, and that the guitar provided a path for him to express his anger and feelings. Impellitteri's first music release was a black EP titled Impellitteri. It was filled with music featuring shredding guitar solos, screaming vocals, and a fast rhythm section. The Impellitteri Black EP established the band's sound in the metal world and was well received by their fans, critics, and respected musicians. Chris Impellitteri was instantly branded a guitar hero after this recording was released. The following Impellitteri record was titled Stand in Line and propelled the band into stardom. The music video "Stand in Line" was played often on MTV and VH1. The Stand in Line album featured Graham Bonnet on lead vocals who formerly sang with the rock band Rainbow. Impellitteri has released two records titled Venom (2015) and The Nature of the Beast (2018). The band Impellitteri currently features Rob Rock on vocals, James Pulli on Bass and Jon Dette on drums. The band has become popular globally and has performed to over 30,000 people at a single show.

== Equipment ==
Over the course of his career, Impellitteri has used a wide variety of different guitar brands and models, including Fender, Gibson, and Dean. He is currently endorsed by Charvel guitars with whom he has a custom model. In addition, he also used ENGL amplifiers and Seymour Duncan pickups. Chris Impellitteri is currently using Charvel and Gibson guitars and Vintage Marshall and Mesa Boogie amplification.

== Discography ==
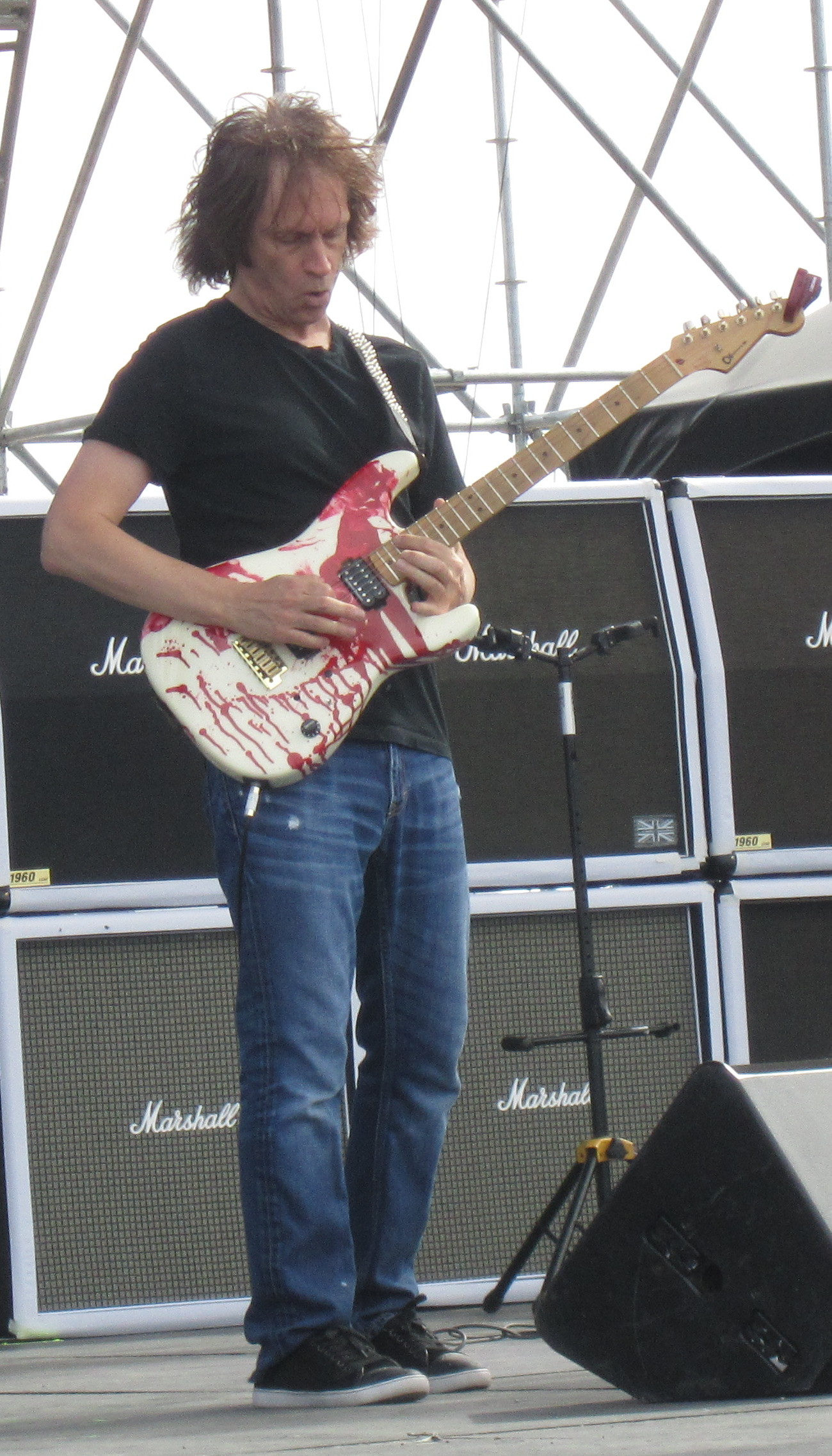
Impellitteri performing in 2016

=== with Impellitteri ===
See: Impellitteri Discography

- Stand in Line (1988)
- Grin and Bear It (1992)
- Answer to the Master (1994)
- Screaming Symphony (1996)
- Eye of the Hurricane (1997)
- Crunch (2000)
- System X (2002)
- Pedal to the Metal (2004)
- Wicked Maiden (2009)
- Venom (2015)
- The Nature of the Beast (2018)

=== with Animetal USA ===
- Animetal USA (2011)
- Animetal USA W (2012)

=== Guest appearances ===
- House of Lords – Sahara (1990)
- Various artists – Dragon Attack: A Tribute to Queen (1997)
- Various artists – Randy Rhoads Tribute (2000)
- Damir Šimić-Shime - tOne Addict (2010)
- Mari Hamada - Gracia (2018)
- Alcatrazz - Born Innocent (2020)
