= Ken Tamplin =

American vocal coach

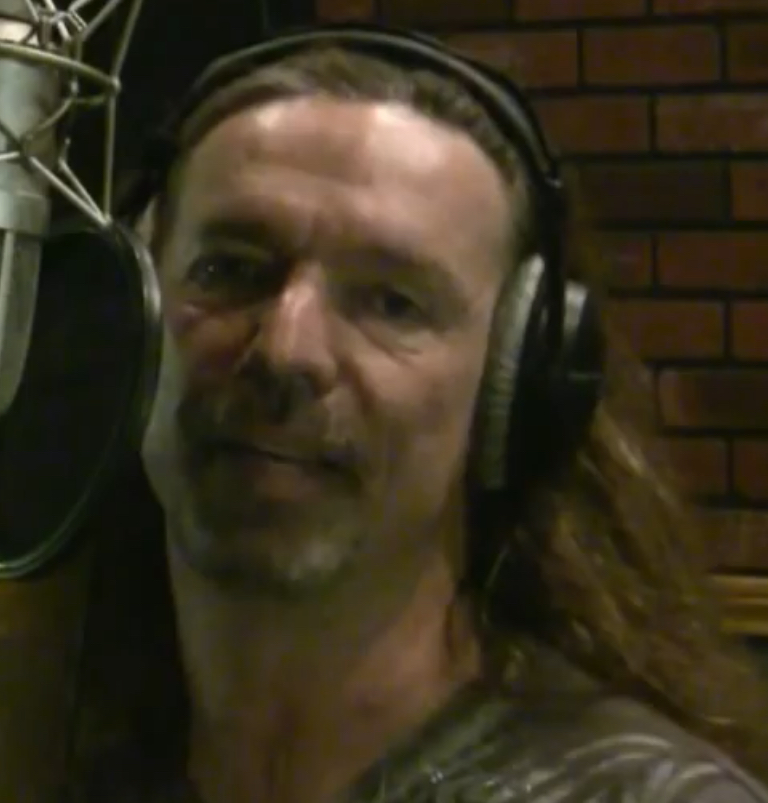
- Tamplin in 2012

Background information
- Genres: Christian rock; hard rock; Christian metal
- Occupations: Vocal coach; YouTuber; singer-songwriter
- Instruments: Vocals; guitar
- Years active: 1980–present
- Labels: Intense; Benson; Girder; Spring Hill; Song Haus
- Website: kentamplinvocalacademy.com

Kenneth Robert Tamplin, known professionally as Ken Tamplin, is an American vocal coach and former Christian rock musician. He is a former member of the bands Joshua, Shout, and Magdallan.

== Early years ==
Tamplin began playing guitar at age six and singing at age nine. Despite being raised in a Christian home, he was not openly Christian until some time before he began his musical career.

== Career ==
Tamplin was one of the members of the group Joshua in the early 1980s. He left Joshua to form the band Shout along with Chuck King. The group disbanded in 1989 after financial difficulties. He went on to found Magdallan with Lanny Cordola.

Tamplin signed a solo recording contract with Frontline Records, releasing the album An Axe To Grind in 1990. He later had recording contracts with Benson Records and Spring Hill Music Group.

Tamplin is the winner of four GMA Dove Awards, including Hard Music Album of the Year at the 25th GMA Dove Awards in 1994, for his album Tamplin; and received 12 nominations.

In 2001, Tamplin produced the album Make Me Your Voice, featuring gospel singer Andraé Crouch, to help raise funds for Christian groups working in Sudan.

== Personal life ==
Tamplin is married and has two children. He was a resident of Costa Mesa, California, and co-owned Music Painter Studios with Robert Hart, located at the nearby Santa Ana Heights. He later relocated with his wife to Flagstaff, Arizona. His Ken Tamplin Vocal Academy and studio are based in Sedona.

Tamplin's brother Lance is a pastor with whom he started Living Stones Fellowship in 2001, which was based at the La Tierra Elementary school in Mission Viejo, where he served as a worship director.

Tamplin is a cousin to former Van Halen frontman Sammy Hagar. Hagar said of Tamplin in an interview: "I've only met him once. But you know, he sends me his records and all that stuff."

== Discography ==
=== Albums ===
- 1985 – Joshua – Surrender
- 1987 – Shout – It Won't Be Long
- 1988 – Shout – In Your Face
- 1989 – Angelica – Angelica
- 1989 – The Power Team – Take 'Em Back
- 1990 – Tamplin and Friends – An Axe to Grind
- 1991 – Ken Tamplin – Soul Survivor
- 1991 – Magdallan – Big Bang
- 1992 – Rock Of The 80's – Volume 1
- 1993 – Tamplin – Tamplin
- 1993 – Hollywood Hairspray – Volume 2
- 1994 – Shout – At The Top Of Their Lungs
- 1995 – Tamplin – In the Witness Box
- 1995 – Ken Tamplin – We the People
- 1995 – Ken Tamplin – Goin' Home
- 1996 – Magdallan – End Of The Ages
- 1997 – Ken Tamplin – Liquid Music Compilation
- 1997 – Ken Tamplin – The Colors of Christmas
- 1997 – Shout – Shout Back
- 1998 – Major League Soundtrack – Back To The Minors
- 1999 – Ken Tamplin – Brave Days of Old
- 2001 – Ken Tamplin – Where Love Is
- 2001 – Ken Tamplin – Make Me Your Voice 1
- 2002 – Laudamus – Lost In Vain
- 2003 – Ken Tamplin and Friends – Wake the Nations
- 2004 – Ken Tamplin – Make Me Your Voice 2
- 2009 – Ken Tamplin – How Sweet the Sound (Spring Hill Music U.S.)
- 2011 – Ken Tamplin – Got You Covered Vol 1
- 2011 – Ken Tamplin – Got You Covered Vol 2
- 2011 – Ken Tamplin – Got You Covered Vol 3
- 2011 – Ken Tamplin – Got You Covered Vol 4
- 2011 – Ken Tamplin – Got You Covered Vol 5
- 2011 – Ken Tamplin – Got You Covered Vol 6
- 2012 – Ken Tamplin – Then Sings My Soul
- 2012 – Ken Tamplin – Superstar Medleys
- 2014 – Ken Tamplin – Ballads of Ken Tamplin Vol 1

=== Additional credits ===
- Kiss – Carnival of Souls: The Final Sessions
