= Silk + Steel =

Studio album by Giuffria
- Released: May 5, 1986
- Recorded: Image Recording Studio, HQ1 Recording Studio, Sound Arts Recording Studio, Village Recording Studio, Los Angeles, California
- Genre: AOR
- Length: 43:20
- Label: MCA
- Producer: Pat Glasser, David Glen Eisley, Gregg Giuffria

Giuffria chronology
Giuffria (1984)	Silk + Steel (1986)

Professional ratings
Review scores
Source	Rating
Allmusic	3/5 stars
Kerrang!	4/5 stars

Silk + Steel was the second album released by American rock band Giuffria in 1986. It was produced by Pat Glasser, who was at the time also the producer of Giuffria's MCA labelmates Night Ranger. The band covered "I Must Be Dreaming", a Willy DeVille song that went to No. 52 on the Billboard Hot 100. The record's peak position on The Billboard 200 was No. 60 on June 21, 1986. "Love You Forever" was released as the second single.

== Track listing ==
All tracks by Gregg Giuffria and David Glen Eisley, except where indicated

1. "No Escape" - 5:29
2. "Love You Forever" - 4:00
3. "I Must Be Dreaming" (Willy DeVille) - 4:24 (Mink DeVille cover)
4. "Girl" - 4:29
5. "Change of Heart" - 3:35
6. "Radio" (Giuffria, Eisley, Cordola) - 4:27
7. "Heartache" - 3:48
8. "Lethal Lover" (Giuffria, Eisley, Cordola) - 4:21
9. "Tell It Like It Is" - 4:06
10. "Dirty Secrets" - 4:41

=== 2000 remastered edition bonus track ===
11. "Say It Ain't True" - 3:45 (from the soundtrack of the movie Gotcha!)

== Personnel ==
- David Glen Eisley - lead and backing vocals, harmonica, producer on track 7, mixing
- Lanny Cordola - guitar, backing vocals
- Gregg Giuffria - keyboards, backing vocals, vocoder, producer on track 7, mixing
- David Sikes - bass, backing vocals
- Alan Krigger - drums

== Production ==
- Pat Glasser - producer
- Rick DeLena - additional recordings, engineer, mixing
- Bill Freesh, John Van Nest - engineers
- Steve Hirsch - additional recordings, assistant engineer
- Stephen Marcussen - mastering
