= Lay It on Me (EP) =

Lay It On Me

EP by Nick Lowe
- Released: June 5, 2020
- Studios: Sawhorse Studio, Silver Shark Studios
- Genres: Rock, Americana
- Label: Yep Roc
- Producer: Nick Lowe

Nick Lowe chronology
Love Starvation / Trombone (2019)	Lay It On Me (2020)	Party of Four (2020)

Lay It On Me is an EP by British singer-songwriter Nick Lowe. It is the third consecutive Nick Lowe EP to feature label-mates, Los Straitjackets, as his backing band. The EP was released through Yep Roc Records on June 5, 2020. Lay It On Me reached number 37 on Billboard's Americana/Folk Albums chart.

== Album background and recording ==
Lay It On Me was recorded at Sawhorse Studios in St. Louis, Missouri. The EP was mixed at Silver Shark Studios in Tooting Bec, London, United Kingdom. The EP was mastered by Tony Cousins at Metropolis in London, UK.

Side A of Lay It On Me features two Nick Lowe originals, titled "Lay It On Me Baby" and "Don't Be Nice to Me." These originals are featured alongside a cover of the Dorsey Burnette-penned, Brenda Lee song "Here Comes That Feeling". Side B features a Los Straitjackets cover of Shocking Blue's "Venus". This cover was produced by Nick Lowe; his first production credit for an artist other than himself in 25 years. The last time Lowe produced another artist was in 1995, producing the Mavericks' cover of "Blue Moon" for the Apollo 13 soundtrack.

Nick Lowe performed "Lay It On Me Baby" for Rolling Stone's "In My Room" on April 10, 2020. The performance featured his son, Roy Lowe, on drums and three other songs: "Trombone", "(What's So Funny 'Bout) Peace, Love, and Understanding", and "I Read a Lot."

== Critical reception ==
Professional ratings
Review scores
Source	Rating
AllMusic	3.5/5 stars

The title track "Lay It On Me Baby" premiered on Rolling Stone's website on April 1, 2020. Angie Martoccio began the article with, "Nick Lowe has dropped a new song, 'Lay It on Me Baby,' off his upcoming EP, Lay It on Me, out June 5th via Yep Roc Records."

No Depression posted a review of Lay It On Me on June 4, 2020. Grant Britt ended his article with, "Crooner Lowe can still rock and roll, perhaps a little grayer, but still shakin', rattlin', and rollin' when the spirit moves him."

In an article for American Songwriter, Paul Zollo said, "American Songwriter is proud to premiere a new song by legendary songwriter-producer Nick Lowe. It's the title track of his new EP Lay It On Me, his third record with the Nashville band Los Straitjackets."

Lay It On Me was given a 3.5 out of 5 rating by AllMusic. Stephen Thomas Erlewine began his review with, "Now that Nick Lowe has reached his third EP of new material recorded with Los Straitjackets, it only stands to reason that the musicians have found the same groove in the studio as they do on-stage."

The EP was also reviewed by Scott Bauer for the Associated Press on June 3, 2020. Bauer began his review with, "In typical Nick Lowe fashion, the upbeat love song that's the title track of his latest EP, 'Lay It On Me,' is immediately followed by a note of caution: 'Don't Be Nice to Me.'"

== Track listing ==
No.	Title	Writer(s)	Length
1.	"Lay It On Me Baby"	Nick Lowe	2:52
2.	"Don't Be Nice to Me"	Nick Lowe	3:01
3.	"Here Comes That Feeling"	Dorsey Burnette; Joe Osborn	2:53
4.	"Venus"	Robbie van Leeuwen	2:53
Total length:			11:39

== Personnel ==
Credits taken from AllMusic.

- Nick Lowe – lead vocals, acoustic guitar, producer
- Eddie Angel – guitar
- Greg Townson – guitar
- Pete Curry – bass
- Chris Sprague – drums, backing vocals

Production

- Nathan Golub – cover illustrations, design
- Peta Waddington – art direction and aesthetics
- Tuck Nelson – recording engineer, mixing
  - Assistance provided by Jason McEntire
- Tony Cousins – mastering
