= Lay It All on Me (album) =

Studio album by James Christian
- Released: July 5, 2013
- Genre: Hard rock
- Label: Frontiers
- Producer: James Christian

James Christian chronology
Meet the Man (2004)	Lay It All on Me (2013)

Professional ratings
Review scores
Source	Rating

Lay It All on Me is the third solo album by James Christian, released on July 5, 2013.

== Track listing ==
1. "Lay It All On Me" (James Christian, Jeff Kent) - 4:49
2. "Sacred Heart" (James Christian, Jeff Kent) - 3:39
3. "Day in the Sun" (Chris Pelcer, Dexter Green) - 3:34
4. "Believe in Me" (James Christian, Chris Pelcer) - 3:32
5. "You're So Bad" (James Christian, Jeff Kent, Tommy Denander) - 4:06
6. "Don't Come Near Me" (James Christian, Jeff Kent, Jimi Bell) - 4:41
7. "Let It Shine" (James Christian, Jeff Kent) - 4:23
8. "She's All the Rage" (James Christian, Jeff Kent, Jimi Bell) - 4:06
9. "Sincerely Yours" (James Christian, Jeff Kent, Tommy Denander) - 3:56
10. "Another Shot in the Dark" (James Christian, Jeff Kent, Tommy Denander) - 3:40
11. "Welcome to Your Future" (James Christian, Jeff Kent, Jimi Bell) - 4:42

== Personnel ==
- James Christian - lead vocals, acoustic guitar, bass guitar
- Jimi Bell - guitar
- Jorge Salas - guitar
- Shelby Stewarr - guitar
- B.J. Zampa - drums
- David Sherman - drums

=== Additional musicians ===
- Jeff Kent - keyboards
- Robin Beck - backing vocals
