= Matt McKenna =

American touring rock bassist (born 1975)

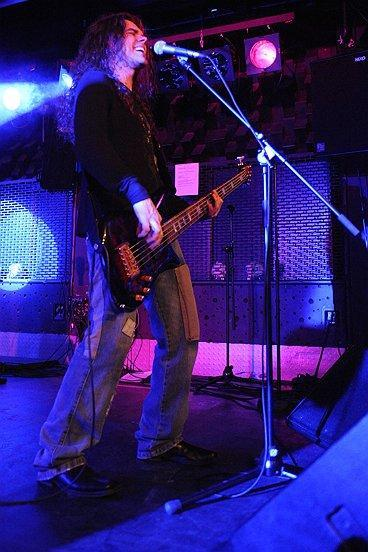
- Matt McKenna, live in Budapest 2008

Background information
- Born: August 19, 1975 (age 49); United States
- Genres: Hard rock, rock, pop
- Occupation: Musician
- Instrument: Bass guitar
- Years active: 1991–present
- Website: www.mattmckenna.co.uk

Matt McKenna (born August 19, 1975) is an American touring rock bassist known for his work with Jude Cole, Swirl 360, Ultrapull, Jetliner, and House of Lords. An American of Scottish descent, he spends much of his off-time in the UK.

== Jude Cole ==
In 1997, Matt received a call from WB/Reprise artist Jude Cole to join his newly formed project "Watertown" featuring Jude on vocals/guitars and Michael Lawrence on drums. The band began rehearsals in the fall of 1997, but dissolved the next year as Jude decided to focus more on producing other artists.

== Swirl 360 ==
In 2001, Matt began working with the pop/rock group Swirl 360 and working on new songs for the film "Van Wilder". In August they performed for Hollywood as part of the International Pop Overthrow. Later that year, Matt parted ways with the group.

== Jetliner ==
In 2005, Matt joined melodic rockers Jetliner just after the release of the band's second album, "Space Station". The band, known for their 1970s arena rock sound and 5-part harmonies received rave reviews in the European press and was a favorite of Sex Pistols guitarist Steve Jones and Queen producer Roy Thomas Baker. Over the course of the band's lifespan, Jetliner consisted of musicians Adam Paskowitz, Josh Paskowitz, Matt McKenna, Rob Jones, Jordan Lawson, Jeff Kluesner and George Castells.

== House of Lords ==
In late 2007, Matt received a call from former Geezer Butler Band guitarist Jimi Bell to join House of Lords for their upcoming world tour. Rehearsals began in January 2008, and the group went on to promote the album Come to My Kingdom with dates throughout Europe, United Kingdom, Brazil, and the United States.
