= World Upside Down =

Studio album by House of Lords
- Released: May 23, 2006
- Recorded: 2005–2006
- Genres: Hard rock, glam metal
- Label: Frontiers
- Producer: James Christian

House of Lords chronology
The Power and the Myth (2004)	World Upside Down (2006)	Live in the UK (2007)

Professional ratings
Review scores
Source	Rating
Allmusic	3/5 stars

World Upside Down is the fifth studio album (second since the reunion), by House of Lords, released on May 23, 2006.

The album features founding member James Christian once again with an all-new line-up, as he is the only one of the original members left on the line-up. Still, founding member Gregg Giuffria, who was not reunited with the original line-up for the 2004 album The Power and the Myth, is featured on the album as a guest keyboardist. However this has been disputed by Jeff Kent, who claimed on his website that he played all the keyboards on the album after Giuffria got cold feet about playing.

Collaborator and producer Jeff Kent played bass and keyboards on the album, as the band was without a bassist at the time.

== Track listing ==
1. "Mask of Eternity (Overture No. 1)" (James Christian, Jeff Kent, Jimi Bell) - 1:45
2. "These Are the Times" (Christian, Kent, Bell) - 4:20
3. "All the Way to Heaven" (Christian, Kent, Bell) - 4:31
4. "Field of Shattered Dreams" (Christian, Kent, Bell) - 5:51
5. "I'm Free" (Christian, Kent, Bell) - 4:05
6. "All the Pieces Falling" (James Lewis, Werner Fritzsching, Kent) - 5:29
7. "Rock Bottom" (Christian, Chris Pelcer, Bell) - 3:52
8. "Million Miles" (Christian/Martin) - 5:06
9. "Your Eyes" (Christian, Kent, Bell) - 4:15
10. "Ghost of Time" (Jame Martin, Tom Martin) - 4:15
11. "My Generation" (Christian, Kent, Bell) - 4:34
12. "S.O.S. in America" (Christian, Kent, Bell) - 4:43
13. "World Upside Down" (Pelcer, Sarah Nagourney) - 4:25
14. "Gone (Japan bonus track)" (Robin Beck, Christian, Bell, Kent) - 3:54

== Personnel ==
- James Christian - lead vocals, guitar
- Jimi Bell - guitar
- B.J. Zampa - drums

=== Additional musicians ===
- Jeff Kent - bass, keyboards, backing vocals
- Greg Giuffria - keyboards (credited but doesn’t play)
- Robin Beck - backing vocals
- Terry Brock - backing vocals
