= Giuffria =

American rock band

- Origin: Washington, D.C., U.S.
- Genres: AOR
- Years active: 1983–1987; 2015
- Label: MCA
- Past members: David Glen Eisley; Craig Goldy; Alan Krigger; Gregg Giuffria; Chuck Wright; Tom Quinton; Lanny Cordola; Rick Bozzo; David Sikes

Giuffria was an American rock band from Washington, D.C., formed in 1981 by Gregg Giuffria after his departure from the band Angel.

== History ==
=== 1982–1983: Early history ===
Giuffria was formed as Gregg Giuffria's side project in 1982 after Angel disbanded. The band's classic line-up consisted of Gregg Giuffria on keyboards, David Glen Eisley (lead vocalist), Craig Goldy (guitar), Chuck Wright (bass), and Alan Krigger (drums). Eisley had recently been vocalist for Los Angeles–based band Sorcery. Goldy had briefly been a member of hard rock/glam metal band Rough Cutt, while Wright had guested on 2 tracks on Quiet Riot's album, Metal Health, although not an official member at the time.

=== 1984–1985: Giuffria ===
Giuffria was signed to MCA Records by Irving Azoff in 1984. Their debut album Giuffria soon followed, peaking at No. 26 on the album charts, while spawning two hit singles, "Call to the Heart" (Hot 100 No. 15) and "Lonely in Love" (Hot 100 No. 57).

The band was a special guest act for Deep Purple on the latter's 1984 reformation US tour. Throughout that tour, despite receiving rave reviews as the opening act, the members of Giuffria were subjected to mistreatment by Deep Purple lead guitarist Ritchie Blackmore, who cut the band's set from 45 minutes to 25. They also were forbidden to perform guitar solos and encores, and had to play with the arena lights on.

The band toured as opener on Foreigner's "Agent Provocateur" Tour, enjoying considerable success. The band then toured in Japan in June 1985 and a live video was released as Giuffria Japan Tour '85. Giuffria was also featured on the Gotcha! soundtrack, with "Never Too Late" and "Say It Ain't True". A third track, "What's Your Name?", featured Gregg Giuffria and David Glen Eisley, but was listed under the name Camelflage. Gregg also produced several of the album's tracks.

=== 1986–1987: Silk + Steel ===
Giuffria's next album, Silk + Steel, was released in 1986, following some lineup changes: Goldy had joined Dio and was replaced by guitarist Lanny Cordola, while Wright returned to Quiet Riot (this time joining the band as an official member) and was replaced by Rick Bozzo and later David Sikes. The first single "I Must be Dreaming" (a Mink DeVille cover) fell short of the Top 40, peaking at No. 52, with the album peaking at No. 60 on the Billboard 200. The second single "Love You Forever" failed to chart even though the single was promoted with an appearance on American Bandstand.

Giuffria left MCA in 1987; Gregg then teamed up with Gene Simmons, where they reconfigured a new lineup, including James Christian on vocals, the return of bassist Chuck Wright and the debut of drummer Ken Mary, who had replaced Alan Krigger. Some of these demos would eventually appear on David Glen Eisley's album The Lost Tapes while three of the songs ("Pleasure Palace", "Jealous Heart", and "Slip Of The Tongue") were recorded for the House of Lords debut album, released on Gene Simmons's new label Simmons/RCA Records.

=== 2015: Rock City reunion concert ===
In 2015, Eisley, Goldy, and Krigger reunited for a one concert event at Rock City, Nottingham, England.

=== 2025–present: The Unreleased Remastered Demos ===
On June 10, 2025, founder Gregg Giuffria and FnA Records released the CD: The Unreleased Remastered Demos. The album consists of nine unreleased remastered demos from the third unreleased Giuffria album, originally to have been called Pleasure Palace, plus a bonus track.

== Band members ==
- David Glen Eisley – lead vocals, harmonica (1983–1987, 2015), guitar (2015)
- Gregg Giuffria – keyboards, synthesizers, keytar, piano, backing vocals (1983–1987)
- Alan Krigger – drums, percussion (1983–1987, 2015)
- Craig Goldy – guitars, backing vocals (1983–1985, 2015)
- Chuck Wright – bass, backing vocals (1983–1985, 1987)
- Lanny Cordola – guitars (1985–1987)
- Rick Bozzo – bass (1985–1986)
- David Sikes – bass (1986–1987)
- Ken Mary – drums, percussion (1987)
- Adam Emmons - keyboards (2015)
- Dario Seixas - bass (2015)

== Discography ==
=== Studio albums ===
- Giuffria (1984)
- Silk + Steel (1986)

=== Compilation albums ===
- The Unreleased Remastered Demos (2025)

=== Singles ===
Title	Release	Peak chart positions		Album
Title	Release	Hot 100	US Rock	Album
"Call to the Heart"	1984	15	3	Giuffria
"Do Me Right" (promo)	1985	—	41	Giuffria
"Lonely in Love"	1985	57	43	Giuffria
"I Must Be Dreaming"	1986	52	28	Silk + Steel
"Love You Forever"	1986	—	—	Silk + Steel

=== Soundtrack appearances ===
Title	Release	Soundtrack
"Say It Ain't True"	1985	Gotcha!

== Bibliography ==
- Hale, Mark (1993). "1162 Guiffria". Headbangers (First edition, second printing ed.). Ann Arbor, Michigan: Popular Culture, Ink. pp. 162–163. ISBN 1-56075-029-4.
- Turman, Katherine (January 30, 1985). "Giuffria: an ex-Angel's band on a rapid ascent". Los Angeles Times. Vol. 104. p. 2.
