= Impellitteri =

American heavy metal band

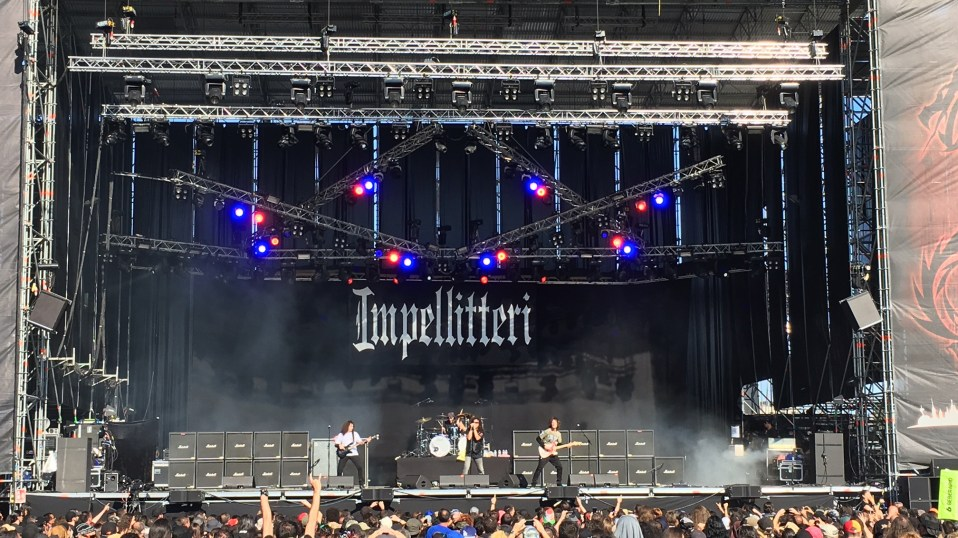
- Impellitteri performing in 2016

Background information
- Origin: Los Angeles, California, U.S.
- Genres: Heavy metal; speed metal; neoclassical metal
- Years active: 1987–1990, 1992–present
- Labels: Relativity, JVC, Frontiers
- Members: Chris Impellitteri; Rob Rock; James Amelio Pulli; Paul Bostaph
- Website: impellitteri.net

Impellitteri is an American heavy metal band from Los Angeles formed and led by guitarist Chris Impellitteri, singer Rob Rock, and bassist James Amelio Pulli. The band has sold over two million albums worldwide.

== History ==
Chris Impellitteri formed Impellitteri together with vocalist Rob Rock in Los Angeles, California. They first released an EP simply titled Impellitteri in 1987. The EP features heavy metal with classically influenced shredding guitar solos, screaming vocals, speed metal drumming and aggressive bass. It features songs like "Lost in the Rain" and "Burning" of which quickly gained the attention of heavy metal fans and musicians around the world. During the release of the EP, many major media outlets began to cover Impellitteri in their magazines including Kerrang!, Guitar World, Circus, and Burrn!.

After the release of the EP, Impellitteri regrouped, this time with British vocalist Graham Bonnet as lead singer, and released an album titled Stand in Line in 1988. MTV played Impellitteri's music video for "Stand in Line" in its rotation, and Chris Impellitteri was a guest host on MTV's Headbangers Ball. Fans voted Impellitteri a "Smash" on MTV's Smash or Trash show. The album charted in Billboards Top 100 and remained there for over five months. To date, the song "Stand in Line" has become a fan favorite globally.

After touring in support of the Impellitteri EP and "Stand in Line", the band returned to the studio and reunited with original vocalist Rob Rock. They then recorded and released their first full-length album with Rob Rock titled “Grin And Bear It” (1992) which was quickly followed up by another EP titled Victim of the System (1993), which was produced by Mike Tacci who was the assistant engineer on Metallica's Black Album (1991). Victim of the System was highly influenced by the band Queen. Following Victim of the System, they released Answer to the Master in late 1994. To date, this album features many fan-favorite songs like "Warrior", "Fly Away", and the album title track "Answer to the Master".

In 1996, Impellitteri released Screaming Symphony, with Chris Impellitteri winning the Burrn! magazine Readers Poll Award for "Best Rock Guitarist". The record was mixed by Michael Wagener who had produced Metallica and Ozzy Osbourne before. The Screaming Symphony features songs such as "Rat Race" and "17th Century Chicken Pickin", which are played frequently during live concerts.

In 2000, Impellitteri released the album Crunch. Crunch was the first record where the band started to occasionally use drop tunings in combination with their brand of shred metal. The album featured songs like "Beware of the Devil", "Slay the Dragon", and "Speed Demon". In addition, the band recorded a ballad titled "Forever Yours".

Shortly after Crunch, Rob Rock decided to pursue a solo career. Impellitteri again recruited Graham Bonnet and began working on their next album titled System X, released in 2002. The album was mixed by Andrew Murdock. That year they also released a compilation of hits called The Very Best of Impellitteri: Faster Than the Speed of Light (2002).

In May 2008, it was announced that Rob Rock was, once again, back with Impellitteri. They collaborated on a new album called Wicked Maiden (2009) with a working title of Good and Evil. Wicked Maiden was released in Japan and Europe on February 24, 2009, with the intent of releasing the new album in the United States in 2011, followed by the Impellitteri Shredfest tour.

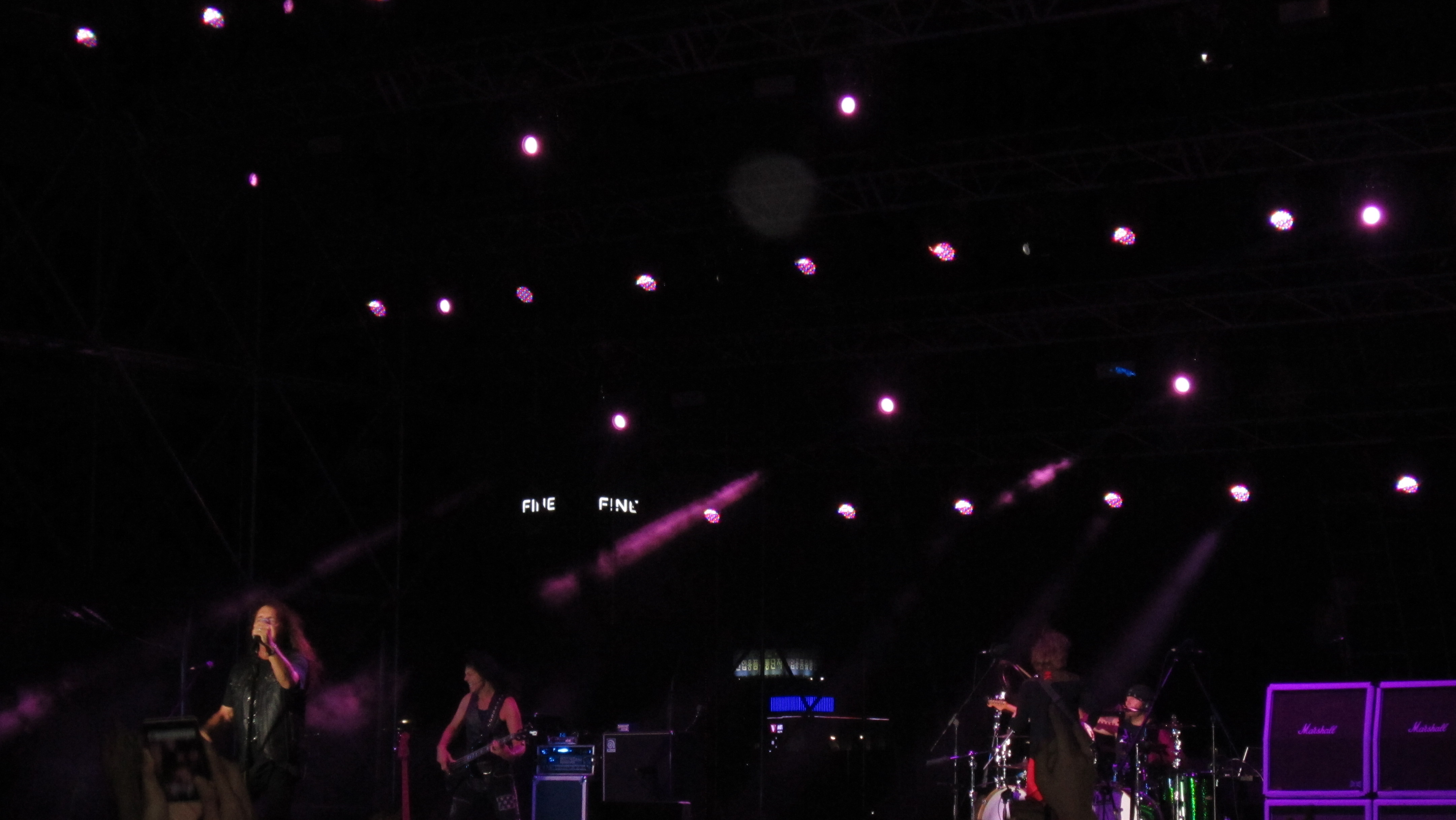
Impellitteri performing in 2016

In 2015, Impellitteri recorded, released, and toured behind their next album Venom. They performed on the headlining stage at Rock Fest Barcelona alongside bands such as Iron Maiden. They also headlined shows such as the Busan Rock Festival in South Korea.

In 2018/2019, Impellitteri released The Nature of the Beast. The album features songs like "Run for Your Life", "Masquerade", and "Wonderworld", as well as two cover songs (Black Sabbath's "Symptom of the Universe" and Andrew Lloyd Webber's "The Phantom of the Opera").

In 2024, the band released a new full-length album, War Machine.

== Beliefs ==
As far as Christian metal ties, Impellitteri (the band) does not consider themselves to be a Christian band. Rob Rock said the following in an interview:

"Chris and I and Ken Mary are all Christians, but James and Ed and Glen, our touring drummer, don't necessarily proclaim themselves as Christians, so it's not a Christian band."

— Rob Rock

== Band members ==
Current

- Chris Impellitteri – guitars (1987–90, 1992–present), bass (1987)
- James Amelio Pulli – bass (1992–present)
- Rob Rock – lead vocals (1987–1988, 1992–2000, 2008–present)
- Paul Bostaph – drums (2024–present)

Former

- Graham Bonnet – lead vocals (1988–1990, 2000–2002)
- Mark Weitz – lead vocals (1990)
- Curtis Skelton – lead vocals (2003–2008)
- Ted Days – bass (1987–1988)
- Chuck Wright – bass (1988, 1992)
- Dave Spitz – bass (1988–1990)
- Loni Silva – drums (1987–1988)
- Pat Torpey – drums (1988) (died 2018)
- Stet Howland – drums (1988–1990)
- Ken Mary – drums (1992, 1994–1999)
- Mark Bistany – drums (1992–1994)
- Phil Wolfe – keyboards (1988–1990)
- Claude Schnell – keyboards (1990, 1993)
- Ed Roth – keyboards (1995–2007)
- Glen Sobel – drums (1999–2009)
- Brandon Wild – drums (2009–2012)
- Jon Dette – drums (2012–2018)
- Patrick Johansson – drums (2018–2024; touring 2016)

Timeline

== Discography ==
Year	Title	Type
1987	Impellitteri	EP
1988	Stand in Line	Studio
1992	Grin and Bear It	Studio
1993	Victim of the System	EP
1994	Answer to the Master	Studio
1996	Screaming Symphony	Studio
1997	Fuel for the Fire	EP
1997	Eye of the Hurricane	Studio
1998	Live! Fast! Loud!	Live
2000	Crunch	Studio
2002	System X	Studio
2002	The Very Best of Impellitteri: Faster Than the Speed of Light	Compilation
2004	Pedal to the Metal	Studio
2009	Wicked Maiden	Studio
2015	Venom	Studio
2018	The Nature of the Beast	Studio
2022	Wake the Beast	Compilation
2023	The Complete Beast 1987-2009	Compilation
2024	War Machine	Studio
