= Ken Mary =

American drummer

- Born: Ken K. Mary
- Genres: Heavy metal
- Occupations: Musician, producer
- Instrument: Drums
- Member of: Flotsam and Jetsam, Once Bitten, Metal Church
- Formerly of: TKO, Chastain, Fifth Angel, Bonfire, Alice Cooper, House of Lords, Accept, Impellitteri
- Website: sonicphish.com

Ken K. Mary is an American musician who has worked as a drummer, producer, engineer, and record executive on over thirty-five albums. He has worked in genres from heavy rock to choral music. Mary is best known for his work with acts such as TKO, Chastain, Fifth Angel, Bonfire, Alice Cooper, House of Lords, Accept and Impellitteri, and is currently the drummer of Flotsam and Jetsam, Jack Russell's Great White/Once Bitten, and Metal Church.

== Discography ==
=== TKO ===
- 1984 – In Your Face
- 1985 – Below the Belt

=== Chastain ===
- 1986 – Ruler of the Wasteland
- 1987 – The 7th of Never
- 1987 – Instrumental Variations
- 1988 – The Voice of the Cult
- 1989 – Within the Heat

=== Fifth Angel ===
- 1986 – Fifth Angel
- 1989 – Time Will Tell
- 2018 – The Third Secret
- 2023 – When Angels Kill

=== Alice Cooper ===
- 1987 – Raise Your Fist and Yell

=== House of Lords ===
- 1988 – House of Lords
- 1990 – Sahara
- 2004 – The Power and the Myth
- 2007 – Live in the UK

=== Impellitteri ===
- 1992 – Grin and Bear It
- 1993 – Victim of the System
- 1994 – Answer to the Master
- 1996 – Screaming Symphony
- 1997 – Fuel for the Fire
- 1997 – Eye of the Hurricane

=== Flotsam and Jetsam ===
- 2019 – The End of Chaos
- 2021 – Blood in the Water
- 2024 – I Am the Weapon
- 2026 – Rats in the Temple (2026)

=== Metal Church ===
- 2026 – Dead to Rights

=== Collaborations ===
- 1987 – Bonfire – Fireworks
- 1991 – Tuff – What Comes Around Goes Around
- 1991 – Bad Moon Rising – Bad Moon Rising
- 1993 – Bad Moon Rising – Blood
- 1995 – Pata – Raised on Rock
- 2001 – David Glen Eisley – The Lost Tapes
- 2004 – Robin Beck – Wonderland
- 2009 – Northern Light Orchestra: The Spirit of Christmas, Live at the Orpheum Theater (Phoenix, Arizona)
- 2010 – Northern Light Orchestra: Celebrate Christmas
- 2020 – Them Fuzzy Monsters: Them Fuzzy Monsters
