= David Glen Eisley =

American musician (born 1952)

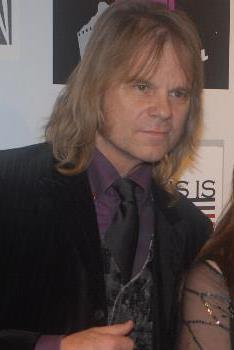
- Eisley in 2008
- Born: September 5, 1952 (age 74); Los Angeles, California, U.S.
- Occupations: Musician; singer; songwriter; actor
- Years active: 1979–present
- Spouse: Olivia Hussey (m. 1991; died 2024)
- Children: India Eisley
- Father: Anthony Eisley
- Musical career
- Genres: Hard rock; heavy metal; arena rock; glam metal
- Instruments: Vocals; keyboards; drums; guitar; harmonica
- Label: Arista
- Formerly of: Sorcery; Giuffria; Dirty White Boy

David Glen Eisley (born September 5, 1952) is an American musician, singer, songwriter and actor.

== Personal life ==
Eisley was born in Los Angeles, California and is the son of actor Anthony Eisley and Judith Tubbs Eisley. While in high school, he played drums for the band Mammoth, an Iron Butterfly cover band. Before settling into music, Eisley spent much of his early days playing baseball. He eventually reached Double-A for the San Francisco Giants, commuting back and forth between games and club gigs.

He was married to actress Olivia Hussey until her death in 2024. They had one daughter, India Eisley. He is the older brother of actor and stuntman Jonathan Erickson Eisley.

== Music career ==
He is most well known for being the lead singer for the AOR bands Sorcery (1980–1983), Giuffria (1983–1988), and Dirty White Boy (1988–1991). With Craig Goldy's "Ritual" he released Hidden In Plain Sight (1991) and Stream (1998). His biggest success came with the band Giuffria, when their hit single "Call to the Heart" reached number 15 on the Billboard Hot 100 in early 1985. Eisley has also appeared in the television shows Beverly Hills, 90210 and 7th Heaven, the movie Action Jackson and has acted in various commercials.

In 1997, Eisley co-wrote the rock ballad "Sweet Victory" with Bob Kulick through Arista Records, and in the following year, APM Music released the track on their Bruton Music Library album American Games. They had previously worked together in the short-lived band Murderer's Row, releasing a self-titled album in 1996.

Four years later, in 2001, the song was featured in the SpongeBob SquarePants episode "Band Geeks", which sharply increased its popularity. It reached number 23 on the Hot Rock Songs chart in February 2019 after its use during that year's Super Bowl halftime show to honor SpongeBob creator Stephen Hillenburg after his death the previous year. A longer, animated presentation of the song was also featured during the NFL on Nickelodeon telecast of the Super Bowl LVIII pre-game show five years later.

=== Later years ===
He has released four solo albums, War Dogs in 1999, Stranger from the Past in 2000, a compilation album of previously unreleased songs, The Lost Tapes, in 2003, and Tattered Torn & Worn... in 2019.

In 2017, Eisley was featured as lead vocalist on three songs on Bob Kulick's album Skeletons in the Closet. On December 1, 2017, he released an album with Craig Goldy, under the band name Eisley/Goldy, titled Blood, Guts and Games.

=== 2025–present: Giuffria Unreleased Third Album ===
On June 10, 2025, Giuffria founder Gregg Giuffria and FnA Records released the CD: The Unreleased Remastered Demos. The album consists of nine unreleased remastered demos from the third Giuffria release plus a bonus track.

== Discography ==
=== Solo ===
- War Dogs (1999)
- Stranger From the Past (2000)
- The Lost Tapes (2001)
- Tattered Torn & Worn... (2019)

=== With Sorcery ===
- Sorcery 2 (2000)
- Sorcery Live (2000)

=== With Giuffria ===
- Giuffria (1984)
- Silk + Steel (1986)
- The Unreleased Remastered Demos (2025)

=== With Dirty White Boy ===
- Dirty White Boy EP (1989)
- Bad Reputation (1990)

=== With Craig Goldy ===
- Hidden in Plain Sight (1991)
- Eisley/Goldy (2017)

=== With Murderer's Row ===
- Murderer's Row (1996)

=== With Stream ===
- Nothing Is Sacred (1998)

=== Guest appearances ===
- Michael Bolton – The Hunger (1987)
- Jimmy Barnes – Freight Train Heart (1987)
- Loudness – Hurricane Eyes (1987)
- House of Lords – Sahara (1990)
- House of Lords – Demons Down (1992)
- Atsushi Yokozeki Project – Raid (1993)
- Frederiksen/Phillips – Frederiksen/Phillips (1995)
- Various artists – Little Guitars: A Tribute to Van Halen (2000)
- Elements of Friction – Elements of Friction (2001)
