= Lanny Cordola =

- Born: December 1, 1960 (age 64); Los Angeles, California, U.S.
- Genres: Heavy metal, hard rock, progressive rock
- Occupation(s): Guitarist, backing vocals
- Years active: 1978–present

Lanny Cordola (born December 1, 1960) is an American guitarist, songwriter and producer. He has been a member of bands such as Giuffria, House of Lords and Magdallan (also known as Magdalen after Ken Tamplin's departure).

Before joining Giuffria, Cordola was the main songwriter for his original bands named Lights, American Heroes and Mondo Cane with songs such as: "All For One", "Lonely Money", "Blow It All Away", "Nasty Girl", "Gypsy in a Twisted World", "Dream Carnival", "High on a Dream", "Empty Cabaret", "Can't Wait Any Longer", "Uncontrolled Fire", "Prime Time", "(She's So) Photogenic", "Walking on the Edge", "Violent City" and "Riddles in the Night".

Both American Heroes and Mondo Cane gained their greatest success in Hollywood in the early 1980s. Other contributing members of those bands included Bret Alstadt on lead vocals, Joey Leon on drums and Loren Robinson on bass guitar. Shawn Perry became Mondo Cane's manager in 1982 and Mark Lundquist, a keyboardist and backing vocalist, was added to the band in 1984. After Robinson left, the band went through three other bass players before disbanding in 1985.

Cordola attended Cypress High School in Cypress, California. He began his career by playing weekend parties in neighborhood garages, and then branched out into the entertainment circuit by playing in nightclubs. While on tour in the Southern California area, Paul Shook (guitar technician), Brent Cobleigh (bass guitar technician) and Scotty Gustafski (drum technician) were the road crew for American Heroes and Mondo Cane. They went on to start to form their own band, Charade, rehearsing several of AH/MC's songs.

Cordola has made several solo albums, as well as being featured as guest musician, songwriter and/or producer on albums with artists like Ken Tamplin and Ransom. Besides the guitar, he also masters other instruments. In 2006, Cordola was a contributor of the Bulgarian rock group D_2 and especially their third album, 6.

Cordola has also appeared on the popular American television sitcom Full House, as a member of Jesse Katsopolis's band, Jesse and the Rippers.

In 2014, following the reporting of a 2012 terrorist attack there, Cordola visited Kabul, Afghanistan. He later returned and engaged in youth work, teaching guitar to teenagers of the war-torn country. "The plan is to make this an entity where they can travel the world, play music, tell the story about their lives and the people of Afghanistan," Cordola is quoted as saying.

== Discography ==
Solo

- Electric Warrior, Acoustic Saint (1991)
- Of Riffs and Symphonies (1992)
- Salvation Medicine Show (1998)
- An Afghan Lullaby (2015)

With Giuffria

- Silk + Steel (1986)

With House of Lords

- House of Lords (1988)
- The Power and the Myth (2004)
- Live in the UK (2007)

With Magdallan

- Big Bang (1992)
- End of the Age (1999)

With Magdalen

- Revolution Mind (1993)
- The Dirt (1994)

With Ken Tamplin

- In the Witness Box (1995)

With The Panorama Ramblers

- Return to Hamilton County (1995)

With Tamplin and Friends

- An Axe to Grind (1990)

With DORO

- DORO (1990)

With Uthanda

- Believe (1992)

With Jazz Trio

- The Trinity Sessions (1995)

With Chaos is the Poetry

- Chaos is the Poetry (1996)

With Gary Griffin

- Blues for the Child (1993)

With Shades of Blue

- Shades of Blue (2010)
