= List of lead vocalists =

This is a list of lead vocalists. This list includes notable musicians whose status as the lead singer and/or vocalist of a musical group has been established by obvious fact or by the musical group itself. This list does not include persons who frequently share lead vocal duties with other members of a given music group (e.g. John Lennon of the Beatles) or who are principally the public face or spokesperson of the music group (e.g. Pete Wentz of Fall Out Boy). The musician's name appears behind a bullet, and the corresponding musical group appears in parentheses.

== 0–9 ==
- 2-D (Gorillaz)

== A ==
- Abbath (Immortal)
- Eric Adams (Manowar)
- Tunde Adebimpe (TV on the Radio)
- Sharon den Adel (Within Temptation)
- Mikael Åkerfeldt (Opeth, Storm Corrosion, ex-Bloodbath)
- Carrie Akre (Hammerbox, Goodness)
- Damon Albarn (Blur, The Good, the Bad & the Queen, Rocket Juice & the Moon)
- Nate Albert (The Kickovers)
- Walt Aldridge (The Shooters)
- Russell Allen (Symphony X, Adrenaline Mob, Star One)
- Gregg Allman (The Allman Brothers Band)
- Marc Almond (Soft Cell)
- Pelle Almqvist (The Hives)
- Tori Amos (Y Kant Tori Read)
- Christopher Amott (Armageddon)
- Chrissy Amphlett (Divinyls)
- Trey Anastasio (Phish)
- Thomas Anders (Modern Talking)
- Angry Anderson (Rose Tattoo)
- Brett Anderson (Suede, The Tears)
- Ian Anderson (Jethro Tull)
- Jon Anderson (Yes)
- Phil Anselmo (Pantera, Superjoint, Down)
- Signe Toly Anderson (Jefferson Airplane)
- Chris Andrews (Chris Ravel and the Ravers)
- Adam Ant (Adam and the Ants)
- Seth Siro Anton (Septicflesh)
- Tom Araya (Slayer)
- Billie Joe Armstrong (Green Day)
- Tim Armstrong (Rancid)
- Richard Ashcroft (The Verve)
- Ian Astbury (The Cult, Southern Death Cult, Death Cult, Holy Barbarians, The Wondergirls)
- Steve Augeri (Journey)
- Ahn Hyejin (Mamamoo, Refund Sisters)
- Milo Aukerman (Descendents)
- Emre Aydın (6. Cadde)

== B ==
- Tairrie B (Manhole, Tura Satana, My Ruin)
- Sebastian Bach (Skid Row)
- Faris Badwan (The Horrors)
- Bae Suzy (Miss A)
- Bae Woo-hee (Dal Shabet)
- Baek Yebin (DIA)
- Tom Bailey (Thompson Twins)
- Adrienne Bailon-Houghton (The Cheetah Girls, 3LW)
- Tunde Baiyewu (Lighthouse Family)
- Anita Baker (Chapter 8)
- Marty Balin (Jefferson Airplane)
- Ian Ball (Gomez)
- Russ Ballard (Argent)
- Chris Ballew (The Presidents of the United States of America)
- Paul Baloff (Exodus)
- Alex Band (The Calling)
- Paul Banks (Interpol)
- Carl Barât (The Libertines, Dirty Pretty Things)
- Gary Barlow (Take That)
- Matthew Barlow (Iced Earth)
- Tom Barman (Deus)
- Chris Barnes (Cannibal Corpse, Six Feet Under)
- Don Barnes (.38 Special)
- Jimmy Barnes (Cold Chisel, INXS)
- Richard Barone (The Bongos)
- Al Barr (Dropkick Murphys)
- Dicky Barrett (The Mighty Mighty Bosstones)
- Richard Barrett (The Valentines)
- Syd Barrett (Pink Floyd)
- Bobby Barth (Axe, Blackfoot)
- Alan Barton (Black Lace, Smokie)
- Natalie Bassingthwaighte (Rogue Traders)
- Stiv Bators (The Dead Boys, The Lords of the New Church)
- Blaze Bayley (Iron Maiden)
- Eric Bazilian (The Hooters)
- William Beckett (The Academy Is...)
- Dan Bejar (Destroyer)
- Denis "Snake" Bélanger (Voivod)
- Andy Bell (Erasure)
- Belle (Kiss of Life)
- Burton C. Bell (Fear Factory)
- Maggie Bell (Stone the Crows)
- Joey Belladonna (Anthrax)
- Matt Bellamy (Muse)
- Max Bemis (Say Anything)
- Chester Bennington (Linkin Park, Dead by Sunrise, Stone Temple Pilots)
- Glen Benton (Deicide)
- Miki Berenyi (Lush)
- Matt Berninger (The National)
- Sam Bettens (K's Choice)
- Jello Biafra (Dead Kennedys)
- Dave Bickler (Survivor)
- Andy Biersack (Black Veil Brides)
- Big Kenny (Big & Rich)
- Chuck Billy (Testament)
- Jón Þór Birgisson (Sigur Rós)
- Mike Bishop (Gwar)
- Cedric Bixler-Zavala (At the Drive-In, The Mars Volta)
- Kat Bjelland (Babes in Toyland, Katastrophy Wife)
- Dan Black (The Servant)
- Paul Black (L.A. Guns)
- Jay Black (Jay and the Americans)
- Jack Black (Tenacious D)
- Jack Blades
- Blag Dahlia (Dwarves)
- Norman Blake (Teenage Fanclub)
- Rico Blanco (Rivermaya)
- Stu Block (Into Eternity, Iced Earth)
- Buster Bloodvessel (Bad Manners)
- Eric Bloom (Blue Öyster Cult)
- Randy Blythe (Lamb of God)
- Beau Bokan (Blessthefall)
- Marc Bolan (T. Rex)
- Brandon Bolmer (Yesterdays Rising, Chiodos)
- Michael Bolton (Blackjack)
- Jon Bon Jovi (Bon Jovi)
- Johnny Bonnel (Swingin' Utters)
- Graham Bonnet (Rainbow, Michael Schenker Group, Alcatrazz)
- Bono (U2)
- Christina Booth (Magenta)
- Johnny Borrell (Razorlight)
- Pierre Bouvier (Simple Plan)
- Marcela Bovio (Stream of Passion)
- Brandon Boyd (Incubus)
- James Dean Bradfield (Manic Street Preachers)
- Daryl Braithwaite (Sherbet)
- Moya Brennan (Clannad)
- Frankie Bridge (S Club 8)
- Lee Brilleaux (Dr. Feelgood)
- Isaac Brock (Modest Mouse, Ugly Casanova)
- Dave Brockie (Gwar)
- Joakim Brodén (Sabaton)
- Gary Brooker (Procol Harum, The Paramounts)
- Elkie Brooks (Vinegar Joe)
- Kix Brooks (Brooks & Dunn)
- Errol Brown (Hot Chocolate)
- Ian Brown (The Stone Roses)
- Matt Browne (King Adora)
- Sharon Bryant (Atlantic Starr)
- Jack Bruce (Cream)
- Lindsey Buckingham (Fleetwood Mac)
- Keith Buckley (Every Time I Die)
- Ely Buendia (Eraserheads, Pupil)
- Tahita Bulmer (New Young Pony Club)
- Eric Burdon (The Animals, War)
- Leroy Burgess (Black Ivory)
- Mark Burgess (The Chameleons)
- Tim Burgess (The Charlatans)
- Benjamin Burnley (Breaking Benjamin)
- Jake Burns (Stiff Little Fingers)
- Pete Burns (Dead or Alive)
- Boz Burrell (King Crimson)
- John Bush (Armored Saint, Anthrax)
- John Butler (John Butler Trio)
- Win Butler (Arcade Fire)
- Biff Byford (Saxon)
- David Byrne (Talking Heads)
- David Byron (Uriah Heep)
- Jean-Michel Byron (Toto)

== C ==
- Brian Cadd (Axiom, The Bootleg Family Band)
- Tony Cadena (The Adolescents)
- Toy Caldwell (The Marshall Tucker Band)
- G. C. Cameron (The Spinners)
- Joe Camilleri (Jo Jo Zep & The Falcons, The Black Sorrows, The Revelators)
- Ali Campbell (UB40)
- Duncan Campbell (UB40)
- Junior Campbell (Marmalade)
- Joey Cape (Lagwagon)
- Captain Beefheart (The Magic Band)
- Mina Caputo (Life of Agony)
- Max Carl (.38 Special, Grand Funk Railroad)
- Austin Carlile (Of Mice & Men)
- Belinda Carlisle (The Go-Go's)
- Paulette Carlson (Highway 101)
- Karen Carpenter (The Carpenters)
- Chris Carrabba (Dashboard Confessional)
- Paul Carrack (Ace, Mike + The Mechanics)
- Earl Carroll (The Cadillacs)
- Nick Carter (Backstreet Boys)
- Julian Casablancas (The Strokes, The Voidz)
- Harry Wayne "KC" Casey (KC and the Sunshine Band)
- Marty Casey (Lovehammers)
- David Cassidy (The Partridge Family)
- Max Cavalera (Soulfly, Sepultura)
- Felix Cavaliere (The Young Rascals)
- Nick Cave (Nick Cave and the Bad Seeds)
- Cee Lo Green (Gnarls Barkley)
- Nic Cester (Jet)
- Peter Cetera (Chicago)
- Guy Chadwick (The House of Love)
- Spencer Chamberlain (Underoath)
- Bill Champlin (Chicago)
- Tom Chaplin (Keane)
- JC Chasez ('N Sync)
- Chris Cheney (The Living End)
- Gary Cherone (Extreme, Van Halen)
- Andy Childs (Sixwire)
- Alex Chilton (The Box Tops, Big Star)
- Cho Kyu-hyun (Super Junior)
- Choi Sung-hee (S.E.S.)
- James Christian (Eyes, House of Lords, Jasper Wrath, Manic Eden)
- Stephen Christian (Anberlin)
- Chuck D (Public Enemy, Confrontation Camp)
- Eric Clapton (Cream, Derek and the Dominos)
- Chantal Claret (Morningwood)
- Nigel Clark (Dodgy)
- Les Claypool (Primus)
- Josh Clayton-Felt (School of Fish)
- George Clinton (Parliament, Funkadelic)
- Cheyne Coates (Madison Avenue)
- Kurt Cobain (Nirvana)
- Jarvis Cocker (Pulp)
- Coko (SWV)
- Jaz Coleman (Killing Joke)
- Doris Coley (The Shirelles)
- Chris Collingwood (Fountains of Wayne)
- Edwyn Collins (Orange Juice)
- Paul Collins (The Beat)
- Phil Collins (Genesis)
- John Connelly (Anthrax, Nuclear Assault)
- Brian Connolly (The Sweet)
- Sam Cooke (The Soul Stirrers)
- Gaz Coombes (Supergrass)
- Alice Cooper (Alice Cooper)
- John Cooper (Skillet)
- Marcus Cooper (Pretty Ricky)
- Julian Cope (The Teardrop Explodes)
- John Corabi (Angora, The Scream, Mötley Crüe, Union)
- Billy Corgan (The Smashing Pumpkins)
- Chris Cornell (Soundgarden, Audioslave)
- Chris Corner (Sneaker Pimps, IAMX)
- Hugh Cornwell (The Stranglers)
- Andrea Corr (The Corrs)
- Paul Cotton (Poco)
- Dave Cousins (Strawbs)
- David Coverdale (Deep Purple, Whitesnake)
- Nadine Coyle (Girls Aloud)
- Wayne Coyne (The Flaming Lips)
- Peter Cox (Go West)
- Sarah Cracknell (Saint Etienne)
- Michael Crafter (I Killed the Prom Queen, Carpathian, Bury Your Dead)
- Jonny Craig (Dance Gavin Dance, Emarosa, Isles & Glaciers)
- Darby Crash (The Germs)
- Kevin Cronin (REO Speedwagon)
- Rich Cronin (LFO)
- Cronos (Venom)
- Jon Crosby (VAST)
- Attila Csihar (Mayhem)
- Burton Cummings (The Guess Who)
- Stephen Cummings (The Sports)
- Rivers Cuomo (Weezer)
- Cherie Currie (The Runaways)
- Justin Currie (Del Amitri)
- Ian Curtis (Joy Division)
- Trace Cyrus (Metro Station)

== D ==
- Brody Dalle (The Distillers, Spinnerette)
- Roger Daltrey (The Who)
- Warrel Dane (Nevermore)
- Ron Dante (The Archies)
- Glenn Danzig (The Misfits, Danzig, Samhain)
- Dappy (N-Dubz)
- Terence Trent D'Arby (INXS)
- Doc Corbin Dart
- Clark Datchler (Johnny Hates Jazz)
- Chris Daughtry (Daughtry)
- Damiano David (Måneskin)
- "Dizzy" Dean Davidson (Britny Fox)
- Iva Davies (Icehouse)
- Ray Davies (The Kinks)
- Rick Davies (Supertramp)
- Jonathan Davis (Korn)
- Margie Day (Griffin Brothers Orchestra)
- Paul Mario Day (Iron Maiden)
- Kelli Dayton (Sneaker Pimps)
- Zack de la Rocha (Rage Against the Machine)
- Dead (Mayhem)
- Johnny Dean (Menswear)
- El DeBarge (DeBarge)
- Carol Decker (T'Pau)
- Martin Degville (Sigue Sigue Sputnik)
- Tom DeLonge (Angels & Airwaves, Blink-182, Box Car Racer)
- Brad Delp (Boston)
- Suze DeMarchi (Baby Animals)
- Paul Dempsey (Something for Kate)
- Andi Deris (Helloween)
- Zooey Deschanel (She & Him)
- Alex Désert (Hepcat)
- Howard Devoto (Buzzcocks, Magazine, Luxuria)
- James Dewar (Robin Trower)
- Dennis DeYoung (Styx)
- Paul Di'Anno (Iron Maiden)
- Jim Diamond (Ph.D.)
- King Diamond (Mercyful Fate)
- Bruce Dickinson (Iron Maiden, Samson)
- Ronnie James Dio (Elf, Rainbow, Black Sabbath, Dio, Heaven & Hell)
- Udo Dirkschneider (Accept, U.D.O.)
- Beth Ditto (Gossip)
- Pete Doherty (The Libertines, Babyshambles)
- Don Dokken (Dokken)
- Micky Dolenz (The Monkees)
- Peter Dolving (The Haunted, Mary Beats Jane)
- Charlie Dominici (Dream Theater, Dominici)
- Ian Donaldson (H_{2}O)
- David Donato (White Tiger)
- Tanya Donelly (Throwing Muses, Belly)
- Ray Dorset (Mungo Jerry)
- Eric Dover (Slash's Snakepit)
- Gord Downie (The Tragically Hip)
- David Draiman (Disturbed)
- Paul Draper (Mansun)
- Corinne Drewery (Swing Out Sister)
- Kevin DuBrow (Quiet Riot)
- Sam Duckworth (Get Cape. Wear Cape. Fly)
- Amy Dumas (The Luchagors)
- Ronnie Dunn (Brooks & Dunn)
- Shane Dunlap (Ernie Haase & Signature Sound)
- Jesse James Dupree (Jackyl)
- Judith Durham (The Seekers)
- Adam Duritz (Counting Crows)
- Fred Durst (Limp Bizkit)
- Ian Dury (Ian Dury and the Blockheads)
- William DuVall (Alice in Chains)
- Deborah Dyer (Skunk Anansie)

== E ==
- Bobbie Eakes (Big Trouble)
- Vince Earl (Vince Earl and the Zeros)
- David Ebo (Harold Melvin & the Blue Notes)
- Aimee Echo (TheStart)
- Kenneth "Babyface" Edmonds (The Deele)
- David Eugene Edwards (16 Horsepower, Wovenhand)
- Johnny Edwards (Foreigner)
- Skye Edwards (Morcheeba)
- David Glen Eisley (Dirty White Boy, Giuffria, Sorcery)
- Danny Elfman (Oingo Boingo)
- Joe Elliott (Def Leppard)
- Sophie Ellis-Bextor (Theaudience)
- Jim Ellison (Material Issue)
- Sam Endicott (The Bravery)
- Paul Engemann (Animotion, Device)
- Thomas Erak (The Fall of Troy)
- Sully Erna (Godsmack)
- James Euringer (Mindless Self Indulgence)
- Dave Evans (AC/DC)
- Jack Evans (Reverend Zen)
- Rod Evans (Deep Purple)

== F ==
- Dez Fafara (DevilDriver, Coal Chamber)
- Donald Fagen (Steely Dan)
- Brian Fair (Shadows Fall)
- Richard Fairbrass (Right Said Fred)
- Edu Falaschi (Angra)
- Brian Fallon (The Gaslight Anthem)
- Bernard Fanning (Powderfinger)
- Mark Farner (Grand Funk Railroad)
- John Farnham (Little River Band)
- Perry Farrell (Psi Com, Jane's Addiction, Porno for Pyros)
- Fat Mike (NOFX)
- Dave Faulkner (Hoodoo Gurus)
- Mark Feehily (Westlife)
- John Feldmann (Goldfinger)
- Fergie (The Black Eyed Peas)
- Jay Ferguson (Spirit, Jo Jo Gunne)
- Hugo Ferreira (Tantric)
- Bryan Ferry (Roxy Music)
- Doug Fieger (The Knack, Sky)
- Shane Filan (Westlife)
- Dani Filth (Cradle of Filth)
- Neil Finn (Crowded House, Split Enz)
- Fish (Marillion)
- George "Corpsegrinder" Fisher (Cannibal Corpse)
- Robert Fleischman (Journey, Vinnie Vincent Invasion)
- Tom Fletcher (McFly)
- Brandon Flowers (The Killers)
- Robert Flynn (Machine Head)
- Dukey Flyswatter (Haunted Garage)
- John Fogerty (Creedence Clearwater Revival)
- Ben Folds (Ben Folds Five)
- Lita Ford
- Jon Foreman (Switchfoot)
- J.D. Fortune (INXS)
- John Foxx (Ultravox)
- Josh Franceschi (You Me at Six)
- Black Francis/Frank Black (Pixies)
- Wil Francis (Aiden)
- Aretha Franklin
- Elizabeth Fraser (Cocteau Twins)
- Jon Fratelli (The Fratellis)
- Dennis Frederiksen (Toto)
- Lars Frederiksen (Lars Frederiksen and the Bastards)
- Marie Fredriksson (Roxette)
- Marcie (née Mark) Free (King Kobra, Unruly Child)
- Tim Freedman (The Whitlams)
- Ace Frehley (Frehley's Comet)
- Glenn Frey (Eagles)
- Anders Fridén (In Flames, Dark Tranquillity)
- Justine Frischmann (Elastica)
- Rick Froberg (Pitchfork, Drive Like Jehu, Hot Snakes)
- Martin Fry (ABC)
- Pauly Fuemana (OMC)
- Vic Fuentes (Pierce the Veil, Isles & Glaciers)
- Bobby Fuller (The Bobby Fuller Four)
- Richie Furay (Poco)
- Peter Furler (Newsboys)
- Justin Furstenfeld (Blue October)

== G ==
- G.O (MBLAQ)
- Peter Gabriel (Genesis)
- Gackt (Malice Mizer)
- Mark Gable (The Choirboys)
- Dave Gahan (Depeche Mode)
- Noel Gallagher (Oasis, Noel Gallagher's High Flying Birds)
- Liam Gallagher (Oasis, Beady Eye)
- Rory Gallagher (Taste)
- Gordon Gano (Violent Femmes)
- Jerry Garcia (Grateful Dead)
- Víctor García (WarCry)
- Janet Gardner (Vixen)
- Peter Garrett (Midnight Oil)
- KatieJane Garside (Daisy Chainsaw, Queenadreena, Ruby Throat)
- Green Gartside (Scritti Politti)
- David Gates (Bread)
- Bob Geldof (The Boomtown Rats)
- Antony Genn (The Hours)
- Boy George (Culture Club)
- Lowell George (Little Feat)
- Max George (The Wanted)
- Jimmy Gestapo (Murphy's Law)
- Ben Gibbard (Death Cab for Cutie)
- Beth Gibbons (Portishead)
- Billy Gibbons (ZZ Top)
- Roland Gift (Fine Young Cannibals)
- Daniel Gildenlöw (Pain of Salvation)
- Nick Gilder (Sweeney Todd)
- Ian Gillan (Deep Purple)
- Aaron Gillespie (The Almost)
- Bobby Gillespie (Primal Scream)
- David Gilmour (Pink Floyd)
- Steve Gilpin (Mi-Sex)
- Ginger (The Wildhearts, Silver Ginger 5)
- Johnny Gioeli (Axel Rudi Pell, Crush 40, Hardline)
- Joe Gittleman (Avoid One Thing)
- Chrigel Glanzmann (Eluveitie)
- Dave Gleeson (The Screaming Jets)
- Corey Glover (Living Colour)
- Marian Gold (Alphaville)
- Alison Goldfrapp (Goldfrapp)
- Selena Gomez (Selena Gomez & the Scene)
- Adam Gontier (Saint Asonia, Three Days Grace)
- Joe Gooch (Ten Years After)
- Jimi Goodwin (Doves)
- Myles Goodwyn (April Wine)
- Jay Gordon (Orgy)
- Angela Gossow (Arch Enemy)
- Laura Jane Grace (Against Me!)
- Greg Graffin (Bad Religion)
- Lou Gramm (Foreigner)
- Michale Graves (Misfits)
- Chad Gray (Hellyeah, Mudvayne)
- Les Gray (Mud)
- Paul Gray (Wa Wa Nee)
- Anthony Green (Saosin, Circa Survive)
- Dallas Green (Alexisonfire)
- Derrick Green (Sepultura)
- Max Green (Violent New Breed)
- Kenny Greene (Intro)
- Alex Greenwald (Phantom Planet)
- Mark "Barney" Greenway (Napalm Death)
- Glenn Gregory (Heaven 17)
- Ciaran Gribbin (INXS)
- Clare Grogan (Altered Images)
- Dave Grohl (Foo Fighters)
- Björk Guðmundsdóttir (The Sugarcubes)
- Bruce Guthro (Runrig)

== H ==
- H.R. (Bad Brains)
- Tony Hadley (Spandau Ballet)
- Sammy Hagar (Van Halen, Montrose, Chickenfoot)
- Emily Haines (Metric)
- Rob Halford (Judas Priest)
- Aaron Hall (Guy)
- Daryl Hall (Hall & Oates)
- John S. Hall (King Missile)
- Terry Hall (The Specials, Fun Boy Three, The Colourfield)
- Faye Hamlin (Play)
- Hahm Eun-jung (T-ara)
- Han Seung-yeon (Kara)
- Kathleen Hanna (Bikini Kill, Le Tigre)
- Neil Hannon (The Divine Comedy)
- Kai Hansen (Gamma Ray, ex-Helloween)
- Kelly Hansen (Foreigner, Hurricane)
- Morten Harket (a-ha)
- Tony Harnell (TNT, Westworld)
- Masato Hayakawa (Coldrain)
- Charlie Harper (U.K. Subs)
- Debbie Harry (Blondie)
- Angie Hart (Frente!)
- Grant Hart (Hüsker Dü)
- Dan Haseltine (Jars of Clay)
- Annie Haslam (Renaissance)
- Miho Hatori (Cibo Matto)
- Hatsune Miku (Vocaloid)
- Davey Havok (AFI)
- Justin Hawkins (The Darkness)
- Taylor Hawkins (Taylor Hawkins and the Coattail Riders)
- Colin Hay (Men at Work)
- Darren Hayes (Savage Garden)
- Gibby Haynes (Butthole Surfers)
- Justin Hayward (The Moody Blues)
- Matt Heafy (Trivium)
- Matty Healy (The 1975)
- Fran Healy (Travis)
- Una Healy (The Saturdays)
- Paul Heaton (The Housemartins, The Beautiful South)
- Luke Hemmings (5 Seconds of Summer)
- Jimi Hendrix (The Jimi Hendrix Experience)
- Don Henley (Eagles)
- Mark Hennessy (Paw)
- Saúl Hernández (Caifanes, Jaguares)
- Heo Sol-ji (EXID)
- Kristin Hersh (Throwing Muses, 50 Foot Wave)
- Brett Hestla (Virgos Merlot, Dark New Day)
- James Hetfield (Metallica)
- Nick Hexum (311)
- Nick Heyward (Haircut One Hundred)
- Lauryn Hill (Fugees)
- Kyosuke Himuro (Boøwy)
- Brent Hinds (Mastodon)
- Tom Hingley (Inspiral Carpets)
- Deni Hines (Rockmelons)
- Bob Hite (Canned Heat)
- Roger Hodgson (Supertramp)
- Steve Hogarth (The Europeans, Marillion)
- Jacob Hoggard (Hedley)
- Frankie J. Holden (Ol' 55)
- Noddy Holder (Slade)
- Dexter Holland (The Offspring)
- Mark Hollis (Talk Talk)
- John Holt (The Paragons)
- Gary Holton (Heavy Metal Kids)
- Josh Homme (Queens of the Stone Age, Them Crooked Vultures)
- Shannon Hoon (Blind Melon)
- Ella Hooper (Killing Heidi)
- Peter Hooton (The Farm)
- Mark Hoppus (+44, Blink-182)
- Natalie Horler (Cascada)
- Trevor Horn (The Buggles, Yes)
- Derek Hough (Ballas Hough Band)
- Tim Howar (Mike + The Mechanics)
- Mike Howe (Metal Church)
- Mick Hucknall (Simply Red)
- Hui (Pentagon)
- Gary Hughes (Ten)
- Glenn Hughes (Trapeze, Deep Purple)
- Charlie Huhn (Foghat)
- Jon Hume (Evermore)
- Miles Hunt (The Wonder Stuff)
- Ian Hunter (Mott the Hoople)
- Mark Hunter (Chimaira)
- Wayne Hussey (The Mission, Hussey-Regan)
- Michael Hutchence (INXS)
- Eugene Hütz (Gogol Bordello)
- Hyde (L'Arc-en-Ciel, Vamps)
- Rob Hyman (The Hooters)
- Chrissie Hynde (The Pretenders)
- Hyolyn (Sistar)
- Hyosung (Secret)

== I ==
- ICS Vortex (Arcturus, Borknagar, Dimmu Borgir)
- Billy Idol (Generation X)
- Frank Iero (Pencey Prep, Leathermouth)
- Ihsahn (Emperor)
- Koshi Inaba (B'z)
- Lux Interior (The Cramps)
- Ricardo Iorio (Almafuerte)
- Donnie Iris (The Jaggerz)
- Ronald Isley (The Isley Brothers)
- Maja Ivarsson (The Sounds)
- Im Nayeon (Twice)

== J ==
- Michael Jackson (The Jackson 5, The Jacksons)
- Jung Wheein (Mamamoo)
- Randy Jackson (Zebra)
- Mick Jagger (The Rolling Stones)
- Jimi Jamison (Survivor)
- Phil Jamieson (Grinspoon)
- Jang Hyun-seung (Beast)
- Floor Jansen (Nightwish, ReVamp)
- Maxi Jazz (Faithless)
- Jay B (Got7)
- Jeong Soyeon (Laboum)
- Jeon Ji-yoon (4Minute)
- Jennie (Blackpink)
- Jung Eunbi (GFriend)
- Toby Jepson (Little Angels, Gun)
- Chris Jericho (Fozzy)
- Jessicka (Scarling., Jack Off Jill)
- Jo Jin-ho (Pentagon)
- Jo Kwon (2AM)
- Joan Jett (The Runaways, Joan Jett and the Blackhearts)
- Jisoo (Blackpink)
- David Johansen (New York Dolls)
- Daniel Johns (Silverchair)
- Big Jack Johnson (The Jelly Roll Kings)
- Brian Johnson (Geordie, AC/DC)
- Holly Johnson (Frankie Goes to Hollywood)
- Kripp Johnson (The Del-Vikings)
- Martin Johnson (Boys Like Girls)
- Matt Johnson (The The)
- Jaren Johnston (American Bang, The Cadillac Three)
- Tom Johnston (The Doobie Brothers)
- Joe Jonas (Jonas Brothers)
- Nick Jonas (Jonas Brothers)
- Danny Jones (McFly)
- Howard Jones (Killswitch Engage)
- Ignatius Jones (Jimmy and the Boys)
- Jason Jones (Drowning Pool, AM Conspiracy)
- Kelly Jones (Stereophonics)
- Mick Jones (Big Audio Dynamite, Carbon/Silicon)
- Paul Jones (Manfred Mann)
- Stephen Jones (Babybird)
- Steve Jones (Neurotic Outsiders)
- Janis Joplin (Big Brother and the Holding Company)
- Ben Jorgensen (Armor for Sleep)
- Tyler Joseph (Twenty One Pilots)
- Juka (Moi dix Mois)
- Jessica Jung (Girls' Generation)
- Jung Eun-ji (Apink)
- Krystal Jung (f(x))
- Nicole Jung (Kara)
- Jung Dae-hyun (B.A.P)
- Jung Yong-hwa (CNBLUE)
- Jung Pil-kyo (Shinhwa)
- Jyrki 69 (The 69 Eyes)

== K ==
- Kahi (After School)
- Glenn Kaiser (Resurrection Band)
- Tony Kakko (Sonata Arctica)
- Tomas Kalnoky (Streetlight Manifesto)
- Kamijo (Versailles, Lareine)
- Kan Mi-youn (Baby Vox)
- Kang Seung-yoon (Winner)
- Alex Kapranos (Franz Ferdinand)
- Tommy Karevik (Kamelot, Seventh Wonder)
- Terry Kath (Chicago)
- Bill Kaulitz (Tokio Hotel)
- Ryuichi Kawamura (Luna Sea, Tourbillon)
- Tomoko Kawase (the brilliant green)
- Jay Kay (Jamiroquai)
- John Kay (Steppenwolf)
- K-Ci (Jodeci)
- Kelly Keagy (Night Ranger)
- Ronan Keating (Boyzone)
- Ron Keel (Steeler, Keel)
- Speedy Keen (Thunderclap Newman)
- Maynard James Keenan (Tool, A Perfect Circle, Puscifer)
- Pepper Keenan (Corrosion of Conformity)
- Tom Keifer (Cinderella)
- Sean Kelly (Models, Absent Friends, The Dukes)
- Ken (VIXX)
- Myles Kennedy (The Mayfield Four, Alter Bridge)
- Bill Kenny (The Ink Spots)
- Dustin Kensrue (Thrice)
- Jim Kerr (Simple Minds)
- Ryan Key (Yellowcard)
- Ontronik Khachaturian (The Apex Theory)
- Mamak Khadem (Axiom of Choice)
- Chaka Khan (Rufus)
- Roy Khan (Kamelot)
- Anthony Kiedis (Red Hot Chili Peppers)
- Greg Kihn (The Greg Kihn Band)
- Kim Dong-jun (ZE:A)
- Kim Jae-joong (JYJ, TVXQ)
- Kim Jong-hyun (Shinee)
- Kim Junsu (JYJ, TVXQ)
- Kim Jung-ah (After School)
- Kim Minjun (2PM)
- Kim Se-jeong (Gugudan, I.O.I)
- Kim Sung-kyu (Infinite)
- Kim Tae-woo (g.o.d)
- Kim Tae-yeon (Girls' Generation)
- Kim Yongsun (Mamamoo)
- Bobby Kimball (Toto)
- Ben E. King (The Drifters)
- Dave King (Fastway, Flogging Molly)
- Jon King (Gang of Four)
- Lance King (Pyramaze, Avian)
- Mark King (Level 42)
- Mollie King (The Saturdays)
- Paul King (King)
- Terry Kirkman (The Association)
- Michael Kiske (Unisonic, ex-Helloween)
- Forrest Kline (Hellogoodbye)
- Jordan Knight (New Kids on the Block)
- Mark Knopfler (Dire Straits)
- Beyoncé Knowles (Destiny's Child)
- Dave Knudson (Minus the Bear)
- Ezra Koenig (Vampire Weekend)
- Koo Jun-hoe (iKON)
- Toshiko Koshijima (Capsule)
- Timo Kotipelto (Stratovarius, Kotipelto)
- Edward Kowalczyk (Live)
- Benjamin Kowalewicz (Billy Talent)
- Andi Kravljaca (Aeon Zen, Seventh Wonder)
- Liv Kristine (Theatre of Tragedy, Leaves' Eyes)
- Chad Kroeger (Nickelback)
- Richard Kruspe (Emigrate)
- Damian Kulash (OK Go)
- Andy Kuntz (Vanden Plas)
- Hansi Kürsch (Blind Guardian)
- Keisuke Kuwata (Southern All Stars)
- Kyo (Dir En Grey)

== L ==
- Patti LaBelle (Labelle)
- Philip Labonte (All That Remains, Shadows Fall)
- James LaBrie (Dream Theater, Winter Rose, MullMuzzler)
- Jesse Lacey (Brand New)
- Pat Lachman (Damageplan, Alice in Chains)
- Ville Laihiala (Poisonblack, Sentenced)
- Alexi Laiho (Children of Bodom)
- Greg Lake (King Crimson, Emerson, Lake & Palmer)
- Keith Lamb (Hush)
- Tim Lambesis (As I Lay Dying)
- Anaïs Lameche (Play)
- Robert Lamm (Chicago)
- Jani Lane (Saints of the Underground, Warrant)
- Mark Lanegan (Screaming Trees)
- Storm Large (Pink Martini)
- Lauren Laverne (Kenickie)
- Blackie Lawless (W.A.S.P.)
- John Lawton (Uriah Heep)
- Adam Lazzara (Taking Back Sunday)
- Simon Le Bon (Duran Duran)
- Jasper Leach (Burner Herzog)
- Jesse Leach (Killswitch Engage, The Empire Shall Fall, Times of Grace)
- Bernie Leadon (Eagles)
- Alvin Lee (Ten Years After)
- Amy Lee (Evanescence)
- Lee Donghae (Super Junior)
- Geddy Lee (Rush)
- Lee Gi-kwang (Beast)
- Lee Hee-jin (Baby V.O.X.)
- Lee Hong-gi (F.T. Island)
- Lee Ji-hye (S#arp)
- Lee Min-woo (Shinhwa)
- Lee Sung-min (Super Junior)
- Terrence Lee (Pantera)
- Bill Leeb (Front Line Assembly)
- London LeGrand (Brides of Destruction)
- Lemmy (Motörhead)
- John Lennon (The Beatles, Plastic Ono Band)
- Annie Lennox (Eurythmics, The Tourists)
- Leo (VIXX)
- JP Leppäluoto (Charon, Poisonblack)
- Katrina Leskanich (Katrina and the Waves)
- Claus Lessmann (Bonfire)
- Jared Leto (Thirty Seconds to Mars)
- Gerald Levert (LeVert)
- Adam Levine (Maroon 5)
- Gary LeVox (Rascal Flatts)
- Hannah Lew (Grass Widow, Cold Beat)
- Aaron Lewis (Staind)
- Juliette Lewis (Juliette and the Licks)
- Phil Lewis (L.A. Guns)
- Rudy Lewis (The Drifters)
- Tony Lewis (The Outfield)
- Gary Lightbody (Snow Patrol)
- Limahl (Kajagoogoo)
- Jim Lindberg (Pennywise)
- Till Lindemann (Rammstein)
- Petri Lindroos (Norther, Ensiferum)
- Mark Linkous (Sparklehorse)
- Fabio Lione (Rhapsody of Fire, Angra)
- Brian Littrell (Backstreet Boys)
- Liz (Ive)
- Ken Lloyd (Oblivion Dust, Fake?)
- Dennis Locorriere (Dr. Hook)
- Pete Loeffler (Chevelle)
- Mr. Lordi (Lordi)
- Gary Louris (The Jayhawks)
- Courtney Love (Hole)
- Mike Love (The Beach Boys)
- Lovefoxxx (CSS)
- Pearl Lowe (Powder)
- Mitch Lucker (Suicide Silence)
- Steve Lukather (Toto)
- Luna (f(x))
- Annabella Lwin (Bow Wow Wow)
- John Lydon (Sex Pistols, Public Image Ltd)
- Frankie Lymon (The Teenagers)
- Edele Lynch (B*Witched)
- Ross Lynch (R5)
- Jeff Lynne (Electric Light Orchestra)
- Phil Lynott (Thin Lizzy, Grand Slam)
- Dennis Lyxzén (Refused, The (International) Noise Conspiracy, The Lost Patrol Band)

== M ==
- Mariqueen Maandig (How To Destroy Angels)
- Craig Mabbitt (Escape the Fate, The Dead Rabbitts, Blessthefall)
- Shane MacGowan (The Pogues)
- Ian MacKaye (Minor Threat, Fugazi, Embrace, The Evens)
- Billy Mackenzie (The Associates)
- Joel Madden (Good Charlotte)
- Russell Mael (Sparks)
- Raine Maida (Our Lady Peace)
- Gilda Maiken (The Skylarks)
- Natalie Maines (Dixie Chicks)
- Makoto Koshinaka (Λucifer)
- Daron Malakian (System of a Down, Scars on Broadway)
- Stephen Malkmus (Pavement)
- Raul Malo (The Mavericks)
- Bamboo Mañalac (Bamboo, Rivermaya)
- Jeff Mangum (Neutral Milk Hotel)
- Jas Mann (Babylon Zoo)
- Marilyn Manson (Marilyn Manson)
- Shirley Manson (Goodbye Mr Mackenzie, Angelfish, Garbage)
- Raymund Marasigan (Sandwich)
- Marjo (Corbeau)
- Bob Marley (Bob Marley and the Wailers)
- Constantine Maroulis (Pray for the Soul of Betty)
- Steve Marriott (Small Faces, Humble Pie)
- Gerry Marsden (Gerry and the Pacemakers)
- Chris Martin (Coldplay)
- Eric Martin (Mr. Big)
- Jeff Martin (The Tea Party)
- Tony Martin (Black Sabbath)
- Masatoshi Ono (Galneryus)
- Kevin Matisyn (Evans Blue)
- Jonah Matranga (Far, Gratitude)
- Cerys Matthews (Catatonia)
- Dave Matthews (Dave Matthews Band)
- Lee Mavers (The La's)
- Kevin Max (DC Talk, Audio Adrenaline)
- Brian May (The Brian May Band)
- Big Maybelle (The Christine Chatman's Orchestra)
- Lauren Mayberry (Chvrches)
- John Mayer (John Mayer Trio)
- Epic Mazur (Crazy Town)
- Terry McBride (McBride & the Ride)
- Dan McCafferty (Nazareth)
- Paul McCartney (The Beatles, Wings)
- Chris McCaughan (The Lawrence Arms)
- Stacey McClean (S Club 8)
- Sarah McLeod (The Superjesus)
- Andy McCluskey (Orchestral Manoeuvres in the Dark, Dalek I Love You)
- John McCrea (Cake)
- Mike McColgan (Dropkick Murphys, Street Dogs)
- Ryan McCombs (Soil, Drowning Pool)
- Travis McCoy (Gym Class Heroes)
- Bert McCracken (The Used)
- Ian McCulloch (Echo & the Bunnymen)
- Richie McDonald (Lonestar)
- Rose McDowall (Strawberry Switchblade)
- Freddie McGregor (Generation Gap, Soul Syndicate)
- Tim McIlrath (Rise Against)
- Toby McKeehan (DC Talk)
- Les McKeown (Bay City Rollers)
- Jeremy McKinnon (A Day to Remember)
- Noel McKoy (James Taylor Quartet)
- AJ McLean (Backstreet Boys)
- Paul McLoone (The Undertones)
- Trevor McNevan (Thousand Foot Krutch)
- Clyde McPhatter (Billy Ward and his Dominoes, The Drifters, The Mount Lebanon Singers)
- Christine McVie (Fleetwood Mac)
- Paul Meany (Mutemath)
- Bill Medley (The Paramours)
- Tom Meighan (Kasabian)
- Klaus Meine (Scorpions)
- Randy Meisner (Eagles)
- Dave Meniketti (Y&T)
- James Mercer (The Shins)
- Natalie Merchant (10,000 Maniacs)
- Freddie Mercury (Queen)
- Naser Mestarihi (Naser Mestarihi)
- George Michael (Wham!)
- Bret Michaels (Poison)
- Jesse Michaels (Operation Ivy, Common Rider)
- Mif (Slash Puppet)
- Billy Milano (Stormtroopers of Death, M.O.D.)
- Deron Miller (CKY)
- Steve Miller (Steve Miller Band)
- Crispian Mills (Kula Shaker)
- Min Sun-ye (Wonder Girls)
- Dimitri Minakakis (The Dillinger Escape Plan)
- Chito Miranda (Parokya ni Edgar)
- Kevin Mitchell (Jebediah)
- Aidan Moffat (Arab Strap)
- Phil Mogg (UFO)
- Tony Molina (The Tony Molina Band, Ovens)
- Brian Molko (Placebo)
- Kanako Momota (Momoiro Clover Z)
- Taylor Momsen (The Pretty Reckless)
- Pat Monahan (Train)
- Michael Monroe (Hanoi Rocks)
- Andrew Montgomery (Geneva)
- Moon Hee-joon (H.O.T.)
- Thurston Moore (Sonic Youth)
- Chino Moreno (Deftones, Team Sleep)
- Shaun Morgan (Seether)
- Takahiro Moriuchi (One Ok Rock)
- Keith Morris (Black Flag, Circle Jerks, Off!)
- Jim Morrison (The Doors)
- Travis Morrison (The Dismemberment Plan)
- Mark Morriss (The Bluetones)
- Morrissey (The Smiths)
- Chuck Mosley (Faith No More)
- Lacey Mosley (Flyleaf)
- Alison Mosshart (The Kills, The Dead Weather)
- Mark Mothersbaugh (Devo)
- Bob Mould (Hüsker Dü)
- Alison Moyet (Yazoo)
- Mike Muir (Suicidal Tendencies)
- Matty Mullins (Memphis May Fire)
- Marcus Mumford (Mumford & Sons)
- Donnie Munro (Runrig)
- Stuart Murdoch (Belle and Sebastian)
- James Murphy (LCD Soundsystem)
- Peter Murphy (Bauhaus, Dalis Car)
- Róisín Murphy (Moloko)
- Shaun Murphy (Little Feat)
- Dave Mustaine (Megadeth)

== N ==
- Nam Woo-hyun (Infinite)
- Suzuka Nakamoto (Babymetal)
- Johnette Napolitano (Concrete Blonde)
- Leigh Nash (Sixpence None the Richer)
- Doc Neeson (The Angels)
- Jennifer Nettles (Sugarland)
- Simon Neil (Biffy Clyro)
- Vince Neil (Mötley Crüe)
- Kim Nekroman (Nekromantix)
- Nikki Nelson (Highway 101)
- Nergal (Behemoth)
- Mike Ness (Social Distortion)
- Heidi Newfield (Trick Pony)
- Colin Newman (Wire)
- Grant Nicholas (Feeder)
- Craig Nicholls (The Vines)
- Stevie Nicks (Fleetwood Mac)
- Tito Nieves (Conjunto Clásico)
- Candice Night (Blackmore's Night)
- Minoru Niihara (Loudness)
- Sarah Nixey (Black Box Recorder)
- Bernie Nolan (The Nolans)
- Maki Nomiya (Pizzicato Five)
- Peter Noone (Herman's Hermits)
- Greig Nori (Treble Charger)
- Bradley Nowell (Sublime)
- Gary Numan (Tubeway Army)
- Terri Nunn (Berlin)
- Jonas Nyrén (Armageddon)
- Anders Nyström (Diabolical Masquerade)

== O ==
- Karen O (Yeah Yeah Yeahs)
- Philip Oakey (The Human League)
- Conor Oberst (Bright Eyes, Desaparecidos)
- Jus Oborn (Electric Wizard)
- Nic Offer (!!!)
- Nivek Ogre (Skinny Puppy)
- Kele Okereke (Bloc Party)
- Fher Olvera (Maná)
- Anette Olzon (Alyson Avenue, Nightwish)
- Jo O'Meara (S Club 7)
- Alexander O'Neal (The Time)
- Onew (SHINee)
- Dolores O'Riordan (The Cranberries)
- Danny O'Donoghue (The Script)
- Robert Ellis Orrall (Orrall & Wright)
- Ozzy Osbourne (Black Sabbath)
- Randy Owen (Alabama)
- Craig Owens (Chiodos, Isles & Glaciers)
- Tim "Ripper" Owens (Judas Priest, Iced Earth, Beyond Fear, Yngwie Malmsteen, Charred Walls of the Damned)

== P ==
- Greg Page (The Wiggles)
- Steven Page (Barenaked Ladies)
- Robert Palmer (Power Station)
- Daryl Palumbo (Glassjaw, Head Automatica)
- Jett Pangan (The dawn)
- Rob Parissi (Wild Cherry)
- Park Bom (2NE1)
- Park Jihyo (Twice)
- Park Gyu-ri (KARA)
- Park Hyung-sik (ZE:A)
- Park So-jin (Girl's Day)
- Park Soyeon (T-ara)
- Park Subin (Dal Shabet)
- Park Sun-young (T-ara)
- Park Ye-eun (Wonder Girls)
- Kevin Parker (Tame Impala)
- Andy Partridge (XTC)
- David Paton (Pilot)
- Kyle Patrick (The Click Five)
- Mike Patton (Dead Cross, Faith No More, Mr. Bungle, Fantômas, Peeping Tom, Tomahawk)
- Aaron Pauley (Jamie's Elsewhere, Of Mice & Men)
- Henry Paul (Outlaws, Blackhawk)
- John Payne (Asia, Asia featuring John Payne)
- Scherrie Payne (The Supremes)
- Stephen Pearcy (Ratt)
- Jemina Pearl (Be Your Own Pet)
- Jizzy Pearl (L.A. Guns, Adler's Appetite)
- Denise Pearson (Five Star)
- Marti Pellow (Wet Wet Wet)
- Linda Perry (4 Non Blondes)
- Steve Perry (Journey)
- Steve Perry (Cherry Poppin' Daddies, White Hot Odyssey)
- Nina Persson (The Cardigans)
- Doro Pesch (Warlock)
- Dave Peters (Throwdown)
- Duane Peters (U.S. Bombs)
- Dickie Peterson (Blue Cheer)
- George Pettit (Alexisonfire)
- Tom Petty (Tom Petty and the Heartbreakers)
- Dave Peverett (Foghat)
- Yannis Philippakis (Foals)
- Wilson Pickett (The Falcons)
- Justin Pierre (Motion City Soundtrack)
- Arnel Pineda (Journey)
- Doug Pinnick (King's X)
- Dave Pirner (Soul Asylum)
- Robert Plant (Led Zeppelin)
- Robert Pollard (Guided by Voices)
- Iggy Pop (The Stooges)
- Cassadee Pope (Hey Monday)
- John Popper (Blues Traveler)
- Louise Post (Veruca Salt)
- Joel Pott (Athlete)
- Mac Powell (Third Day)
- Reg Presley (The Troggs)
- Samuel Preston (The Ordinary Boys)
- Chad Price (All)
- Luca Prodan (Sumo)
- Greg Puciato (The Dillinger Escape Plan, The Black Queen)
- Jordan Pundik (New Found Glory)
- Seth Putnam (Anal Cunt)

== R ==
- Ronnie Radke (Falling in Reverse, Escape the Fate)
- Gerry Rafferty (Stealers Wheel)
- Raina (After School)
- Rome Ramirez (Sublime with Rome)
- C. J. Ramone (Ramones)
- Dee Dee Ramone (Ramones)
- Joey Ramone (Ramones)
- Larry Ramos (The Association)
- Josh Ramsay (Marianas Trench)
- Mary Ramsey (10,000 Maniacs, John & Mary)
- Lee Ranaldo (Sonic Youth)
- Toby Rand (Juke Kartel)
- Danny Rapp (Danny & the Juniors)
- Marty Raybon (Shenandoah, Raybon Brothers)
- Eddi Reader (Fairground Attraction)
- Jaret Reddick (Bowling for Soup)
- Eugene Record (The Chi-Lites)
- David Reece (Accept, Bonfire)
- Lou Reed (The Velvet Underground)
- Martha Reeves (Martha and the Vandellas)
- Julianne Regan (All About Eve, Hussey-Regan)
- Riff Regan (London)
- Jim Reid (The Jesus and Mary Chain)
- Brandon Reilly (Nightmare of You)
- John Reis (Rocket from the Crypt, Sultans, The Night Marchers)
- Jane Relf (Renaissance, Illusion)
- Keith Relf (The Yardbirds, Renaissance)
- Jonas Renkse (Katatonia)
- Dan Reynolds (Imagine Dragons)
- Trent Reznor (Nine Inch Nails)
- Lou Rhodes (Lamb)
- John Rich (Lonestar, Big & Rich)
- Glenn Richards (Augie March)
- Lionel Richie (Commodores)
- Geoff Rickly (Thursday)
- Alastair Riddell (Space Waltz)
- Stan Ridgway (Wall of Voodoo)
- Boots Riley (The Coup, Street Sweeper Social Club)
- Andrew Roachford (Mike and the Mechanics)
- Brad Roberts (Crash Test Dummies)
- Paul Roberts (The Stranglers)
- Ed Robertson (Barenaked Ladies)
- Patrick Robertson (Motor Ace)
- Chris Robinson (The Black Crowes)
- Smokey Robinson (The Miracles)
- Tom Robinson (Tom Robinson Band)
- Tito Rodríguez (La Playa Sextet)
- Ranking Roger (The Beat)
- Tim Rogers (You Am I)
- Paul Rodgers (Free, Bad Company, The Firm, The Law, Queen + Paul Rodgers)
- Tommy Rogers (Between the Buried and Me, Giles)
- Ed Roland (Collective Soul)
- Gregg Rolie (Journey, Santana)
- Henry Rollins (Black Flag, Rollins Band, State of Alert)
- Axl Rose (Guns N' Roses)
- Michael Rose (Black Uhuru)
- Diana Ross (The Supremes)
- Ricky Ross (Deacon Blue)
- Jimmie Ross (The Jaggerz)
- Gavin Rossdale (Bush)
- Lukas Rossi (Rock Star Supernova, The Halo Method)
- Martin Rossiter (Gene)
- David Lee Roth (Van Halen)
- Demis Roussos (Aphrodite's Child)
- Kevin Rowland (Dexys Midnight Runners)
- Ellie Rowsell (Wolf Alice)
- Darius Rucker (Hootie & the Blowfish)
- Mike Rudd (Spectrum)
- Nate Ruess (The Format, fun.)
- David Ruffin (The Temptations)
- Vic Ruggiero (The Slackers)
- Tim Rushlow (Little Texas, Rushlow, Rushlow Harris)
- Jack Russell (Great White)
- Jimmy Ryan (Haste the Day)
- Elize Ryd (Amaranthe)
- Shaun Ryder (Happy Mondays, Black Grape)
- Kristoffer Rygg (Ulver, Arcturus, Head Control System)
- John Rzeznik (Goo Goo Dolls)

== S ==
- Sade (Sade)
- Saffron (Republica)
- Tobias Sammet (Edguy, Avantasia)
- Claudio Sanchez (Coheed and Cambria)
- Karl Sanders (Nile)
- Troy Sanders (Mastodon)
- Sandeul (B1A4)
- Sonny Sandoval (P.O.D.)
- Justin Sane (Anti-Flag)
- Jenna Sanz-Agero (Vixen)
- Gabe Saporta (Cobra Starship)
- Satyr (Satyricon)
- Cristina Scabbia (Lacuna Coil)
- Brett Scallions (Fuel)
- Wes Scantlin (Puddle of Mudd)
- Jason Scheff (Chicago)
- Nicole Scherzinger (The Pussycat Dolls)
- Kendall Schmidt (Big Time Rush)
- Fred Schneider (The B-52's, The Superions)
- Chuck Schuldiner (Death)
- John Schumann (Redgum)
- Jason Schwartzman (Coconut Records)
- Blake Schwarzenbach (Jawbreaker)
- Mike Score (A Flock of Seagulls)
- Bon Scott (AC/DC)
- Josey Scott (Saliva)
- Mike Scott (The Waterboys)
- Walter Scott (Bob Kuban & the In-Men)
- Brady Seals (Little Texas, Hot Apple Pie)
- Seo Eun-kwang (BtoB)
- Seo Min-woo (100%)
- Seohyun (Girls' Generation)
- Jacoby Shaddix (Papa Roach)
- M. Shadows (Avenged Sevenfold)
- Shagrath (Dimmu Borgir)
- Otep Shamaya (Otep)
- Feargal Sharkey (The Undertones)
- Bernie Shaw (Uriah Heep)
- Mark Shaw (Then Jerico)
- Tommy Shaw (Styx)
- Bobby Sheen (Bob B. Soxx & the Blue Jeans)
- Burke Shelley (Budgie)
- Pete Shelley (Buzzcocks)
- Shifty Shellshock (Crazy Town)
- Shim Eun-jin (Baby V.O.X.)
- Danny Shirley (Confederate Railroad)
- Mike Shinoda (Fort Minor, Linkin Park)
- Caleb Shomo (Attack Attack!, Beartooth)
- Shingai Shoniwa (Noisettes)
- Glenn Shorrock (The Twilights, Axiom, Little River Band)
- Matt Shultz (Cage the Elephant)
- Nell Sigland (Theatre of Tragedy)
- Gene Simmons (KISS)
- Simone Simons (Epica)
- Charlie Simpson (Fightstar)
- Frank Sinatra (Harry James and His Music Makers, Tommy Dorsey Orchestra)
- Siouxsie Sioux (Siouxsie and the Banshees)
- Matt Skiba (Alkaline Trio)
- Skinhead Rob (Transplants)
- Isaac Slade (The Fray)
- Mark Slaughter (Slaughter, Vinnie Vincent Invasion)
- Spike Slawson (Me First and the Gimme Gimmes)
- Grace Slick (Jefferson Airplane, Jefferson Starship)
- Tony Sly (No Use for a Name)
- Brendon Small (Dethklok)
- Brent Smith (Shinedown)
- Broderick Smith (The Dingoes)
- Chad Smith (Chad Smith's Bombastic Meatbats)
- Dan Smith (Bastille)
- Mike Smith (The Dave Clark Five)
- Patti Smith
- Paul Smith (Maxïmo Park)
- Robert Smith (The Cure)
- Tom Smith (Editors)
- Patty Smyth (Scandal)
- C. J. Snare (FireHouse)
- Dee Snider (Twisted Sister)
- Song Yuvin (MYTEEN)
- Jimmy Somerville (Bronski Beat, The Communards)
- Jeff Scott Soto (Yngwie Malmsteen, Soul SirkUS, Journey)
- Soyou (Sistar)
- Ronnie Spector (The Ronettes)
- Jon Spencer (Pussy Galore, Jon Spencer Blues Explosion)
- Spider One (Powerman 5000)
- Sharleen Spiteri (Texas)
- Bruce Springsteen (E Street Band)
- Adalita Srsen (Magic Dirt)
- Layne Staley (Alice in Chains)
- Paul Stanley (KISS)
- Mikael Stanne (Dark Tranquillity, In Flames, HammerFall)
- Derek St. Holmes (Ted Nugent)
- David St. Hubbins (Spinal Tap)
- Jaime St. James (Black 'n Blue, Warrant)
- Joe Stampley (The Cut-Ups)
- Scott Stapp (Creed)
- Michael Starr (Steel Panther, L.A. Guns)
- Jeffrey Steele (Boy Howdy)
- Katy Steele (Little Birdy)
- Luke Steele (The Sleepy Jackson)
- Peter Steele (Type O Negative)
- Bill Steer (Carcass)
- Gwen Stefani (No Doubt)
- Vibeke Stene (Tristania)
- Jon Stevens (INXS)
- Shakin' Stevens (Shakin' Stevens and the Sunsets)
- Larry Stewart (Restless Heart)
- Rod Stewart (Faces, The Jeff Beck Group, The Kinks)
- Sting (The Police)
- Michael Stipe (R.E.M.)
- Andrew Stockdale (Wolfmother)
- Laura Stoica (Laura Stoica Band)
- Sly Stone (Sly and the Family Stone)
- Marc Storace (Krokus)
- Stovepipe No. 1 (King David's Jug Band)
- Shirley Strachan (Skyhooks)
- Lynn Strait (Snot)
- Steve Strange (Visage, Strange Cruise)
- Joe Strummer (The Clash)
- Mark Stuart (Audio Adrenaline)
- Joe Stubbs (The Falcons)
- Levi Stubbs (Four Tops)
- Patrick Stump (Fall Out Boy)
- Scott Sturgeon (Leftöver Crack, Choking Victim)
- Poly Styrene (X-Ray Spex)
- Nikki Sudden (Swell Maps)
- Suggs (Madness)
- Bernard Sumner (New Order, Electronic)
- Damo Suzuki (Can)
- Dan Swanö (Nightingale)
- Michael Sweet (Stryper)
- Rob Swire (Pendulum)
- Oli Sykes (Bring Me the Horizon)
- David Sylvian (Japan, Rain Tree Crow)

== T ==
- Ty Tabor (King's X)
- Peter Tägtgren (Hypocrisy)
- Michael Tait (DC Talk, Tait, Newsboys)
- Yukihiro Takahashi (Yellow Magic Orchestra)
- Serj Tankian (System of a Down)
- Trevor Tanner (The Bolshoi)
- Geoff Tate (Queensrÿche)
- Corey Taylor (Slipknot, Stone Sour)
- Dallas Taylor (Underoath, Maylene and the Sons of Disaster)
- James "J.T." Taylor (Kool & the Gang)
- Johnnie Taylor (The Soul Stirrers)
- Les Taylor (Exile)
- Roger Taylor (The Cross)
- Courtney Taylor-Taylor (The Dandy Warhols)
- Ryan Tedder (OneRepublic)
- Kav Temperley (Eskimo Joe)
- Joey Tempest (Europe)
- Bobby Tench (Hummingbird)
- Neil Tennant (Pet Shop Boys)
- Jean Terrell (The Supremes)
- Teru (Glay)
- ZP Theart (DragonForce)
- Matt Thiessen (Relient K)
- Rai Thistlethwayte (Thirsty Merc)
- Mick Thomas (Weddings Parties Anything)
- Mickey Thomas (Jefferson Starship)
- Rob Thomas (Matchbox Twenty)
- Tony Thompson (Hi-Five)
- Tracey Thorn (Everything but the Girl)
- George Thorogood (George Thorogood and the Destroyers)
- Tiffany (Girls' Generation)
- Sonny Til (The Orioles)
- Glenn Tilbrook (Squeeze)
- Justin Timberlake (NSYNC)
- Mary Timony (Helium, Autoclave, Wild Flag)
- Eicca Toppinen (Apocalyptica)
- Mark Tornillo (Accept)
- Toshi (X Japan)
- Mike Tramp (Freak of Nature, White Lion)
- Trần Lập (Bức Tường)
- Ralph Tresvant (New Edition)
- Tõnu Trubetsky (Vennaskond)
- Matthew Tuck (Bullet for My Valentine)
- Dennis Tufano (The Buckinghams)
- Neil Turbin (Anthrax)
- Alex Turner (Arctic Monkeys, The Last Shadow Puppets)
- Joe Lynn Turner (Rainbow, Deep Purple)
- Tina Turner (The Ike & Tina Turner Revue)
- Tarja Turunen (Nightwish)
- Steven Tyler (Aerosmith)
- Rob Tyner (MC5)

== U ==
- Ari Up (The Slits)
- Pat Upton (Spiral Starecase)
- Midge Ure (Slik, Rich Kids, Ultravox)
- Brendon Urie (Panic! at the Disco)
- David Usher (Moist)
- Jimmy Urine (Mindless Self Indulgence)

== V ==
- Ritchie Valens (The Silhouettes)
- Billy Valentine (Johnny Moore's Three Blazers)
- Dick Valentine (Electric Six)
- Frankie Valli (The Four Seasons)
- Ville Valo (HIM)
- Marijne van der Vlugt (Salad)
- David Vanian (The Damned)
- Donnie Van Zant (.38 Special)
- Johnny Van Zant (Lynyrd Skynyrd)
- Ronnie Van Zant (Lynyrd Skynyrd)
- Vanity (Vanity 6)
- Kenny Vasoli (The Starting Line)
- Stevie Ray Vaughan (Double Trouble)
- Eddie Vedder (Pearl Jam)
- Tom Verlaine (Television)
- Varg Vikernes (Burzum)
- David Vincent (Morbid Angel)
- Vorph (Samael)
- Pete Vuckovic (3 Colours Red)

== W ==
- John Waite (The Babys, Bad English)
- Dave Wakeling (The Beat, General Public)
- Vincent Walker (Suburban Legends)
- James Walsh (Starsailor)
- Joe Walsh (James Gang, Eagles)
- Steve Walsh (Kansas)
- Scooter Ward (Cold)
- Baz Warne (The Stranglers)
- Ricky Warwick (The Almighty, Black Star Riders)
- Sabrina Washington (Mis-Teeq)
- Roger Waters (Pink Floyd)
- Ian Watkins (Lostprophets)
- Tionne Watkins (TLC)
- Gerard Way (My Chemical Romance)
- Fee Waybill (The Tubes)
- Carl Wayne (The Move, The Hollies)
- David Wayne (Metal Church)
- Ben Weasel (Screeching Weasel, Riverdales)
- Scott Weiland (Stone Temple Pilots, Velvet Revolver)
- Brian Welch (Love and Death)
- Florence Welch (Florence and the Machine)
- Paul Weller (The Jam, The Style Council)
- Wendy (Red Velvet)
- Paul Westerberg (The Replacements)
- Louise Wener (Sleeper)
- Leslie West (Mountain, Lana and the Cheap Girls)
- John Wetton (King Crimson, Asia)
- Tim Wheeler (Ash)
- Charlotte Wessels (Delain)
- Deryck Whibley (Sum 41)
- Jack White (The White Stripes, The Dead Weather, The Raconteurs)
- Katie White (The Ting Tings)
- Vanessa White (The Saturdays)
- Emily Whitehurst (Tsunami Bomb, The Action Design)
- Alissa White-Gluz (The Agonist, Arch Enemy)
- Amanda Wilkinson (The Wilkinsons)
- will.i.am (Black Eyed Peas)
- Dave Williams (Drowning Pool)
- Hayley Williams (Paramore)
- Jez Williams (Doves)
- Joseph Williams (Toto)
- Pharrell Williams (N.E.R.D)
- Tony Williams (The Platters)
- Victor Willis (Village People)
- Ann Wilson (Heart)
- Carl Wilson (The Beach Boys)
- Charlie Wilson (The Gap Band)
- Dan Wilson (Semisonic)
- Kim Wilson (The Fabulous Thunderbirds)
- Lonnie Wilson (Bandana)
- Ray Wilson (Stiltskin, Genesis)
- Ricky Wilson (Kaiser Chiefs)
- Robin Wilson (Gin Blossoms)
- Ross Wilson (Daddy Cool, Mondo Rock)
- Steven Wilson (Porcupine Tree, Blackfield, Storm Corrosion)
- Kirk Windstein (Crowbar)
- Kip Winger (Winger)
- Steve Winwood (The Spencer Davis Group, Traffic, Go, Blind Faith)
- Lajon Witherspoon (Sevendust)
- Rick Witter (Shed Seven)
- Piotr Wiwczarek (Vader)
- Wong Ka Kui (Beyond)
- Eric Woolfson (The Alan Parsons Project)
- Kevin Woo (U-KISS)
- Andrew Wood (Mother Love Bone, Malfunkshun)
- Brandon Wood (New Tomorrow)
- Roy Wood (The Move, Wizzard, Electric Light Orchestra)
- Tilo Wolff (Lacrimosa)
- Finn Wolfhard (Calpurnia)
- Roddy Woomble (Idlewild)
- Danny Worsnop (Asking Alexandria, We Are Harlot)
- John Wozniak (Marcy Playground)
- Curtis Wright (Orrall & Wright, Shenandoah)
- Zakk Wylde (Black Label Society)
- Dave Wyndorf (Monster Magnet)
- Mark Wystrach (Midland)

== Y ==
- Yamantaka Eye (Boredoms)
- Yang Seung-ho (MBLAQ)
- Yang Yo-seob (Highlight)
- Jimmy Yeary (Shenandoah)
- Yeo Hoon-min (U-KISS)
- Quan Yeomans (Regurgitator)
- Jim Yester (The Association)
- Lauri Ylönen (The Rasmus)
- Yoo Ki-hyun (Monsta X)
- Yoo Young-jae (B.A.P)
- Yook Sung-jae (BtoB)
- Yoon Chae-kyung (April)
- Andy Yorke (Unbelievable Truth)
- Thom Yorke (Radiohead)
- Paul Young (Q-Tips, Los Pacaminos)
- Paul Young (Sad Café, Mike + The Mechanics)
- Rusty Young (Poco)
- David Yow (The Jesus Lizard)
- Yuju (GFriend)
- Yoo Jeongyeon (Twice)

== Z ==
- Robin Zander (Cheap Trick)
- Rob Zombie (White Zombie)

== Related lists ==
- List of female rock singers
