= Trần Lập =

Vietnamese musician (1974–2016)

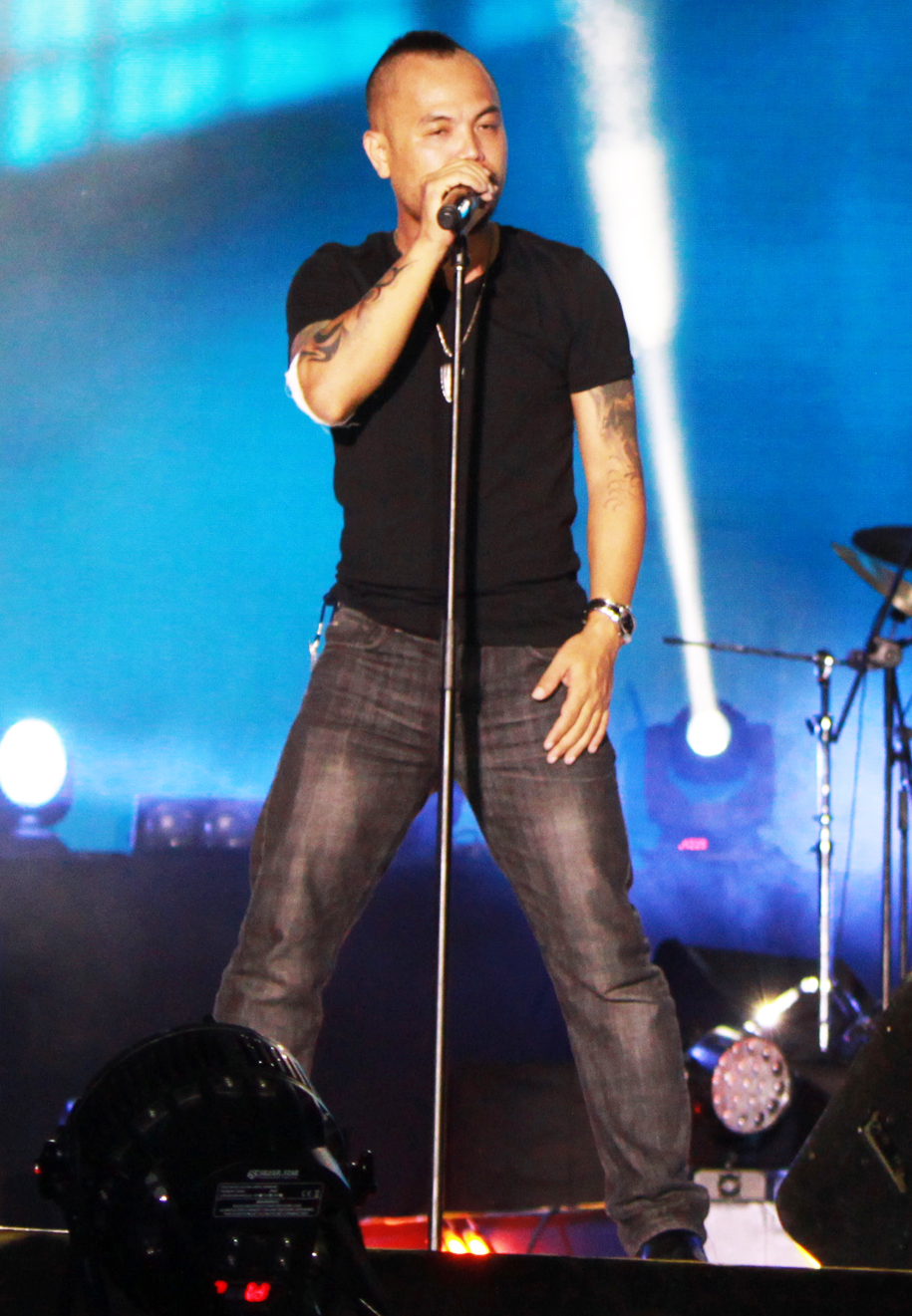
- Trần Lập in 2012
- Born: Trần Quyết Lập; 12 December 1974; Vụ Bản, Nam Định, North Vietnam
- Died: 17 March 2016 (aged 41); Hanoi, Vietnam
- Education: Hanoi College of Art; Hanoi University of Social Sciences and Humanities
- Occupations: Singer; songwriter
- Spouse: Ngô Thị Mai Hoa (m. 2003–2016)
- Children: 2
- Musical career
- Genres: Rock; hard rock; heavy metal
- Instrument: Vocals
- Years active: 1995–2016
- Labels: Hanoi Audio & Visual; Thang Long Audio & Visual

Trần Quyết Lập (12 December 1974 – 17 March 2016) was a Vietnamese singer and songwriter. He was the lead vocalist, lead songwriter, and co-founder of the rock band Bức Tường (The Wall). The band is considered to have the largest fanbase and most persistent activity in Vietnam, having "Đường đến ngày vinh quang" ("The Road to Glory Days") as their signature song.

In the early days of rock music in Vietnam, Lập and his band were among the pioneers of Vietnamese rock. His songwriting is considered "consistently of high quality". He was diagnosed with colorectal cancer in 2015 and died on 17 March 2016 at his home.

== Early life ==
Trần Quyết Lập was born on 12 December 1974 in Vụ Bản district, Nam Định province, Democratic Republic of Vietnam. The youngest son of an impoverished family, he showed a natural talent for music from an early age. When Lập was a teenager, his father was half-paralyzed, and his mother suffered from severe arthritis. Because his siblings worked far from home, he had to take care of his parents by himself.

== Career ==
Lập's musical career began in 1993–1997, when he took classes on performing arts and vocal techniques in the Department of Theatre of the Hanoi College of Art. He also studied economics at Hanoi National University (graduating in 2001) and literature at Hanoi University of Social Sciences and Humanities (graduating in 2004). In May 2006, during Bức Tường's long hiatus, Lập was asked to host Hanoi Radio Television's game show "Vượt qua thử thách" ("The Vault").

=== Bức Tường years ===
On 26 March 1995, Lập cofounded the rock band Bức Tường, in which he was the lead vocalist and chief songwriter. The band is considered to have the largest fanbase and most persistent activity in Vietnam, having "The Road to Glory Days" as their signature song. Lập wrote the song "The Road to Glory Days" in 1998, when his band was struggling to overcome financial problems. Bức Tường spent all their money on recording the song. After completing the song, they sent it to the editor Long Vũ, who played "The Road to Glory Days" during a sports newscast. The song immediately received much acclaim, leading to more opportunities for live performances.

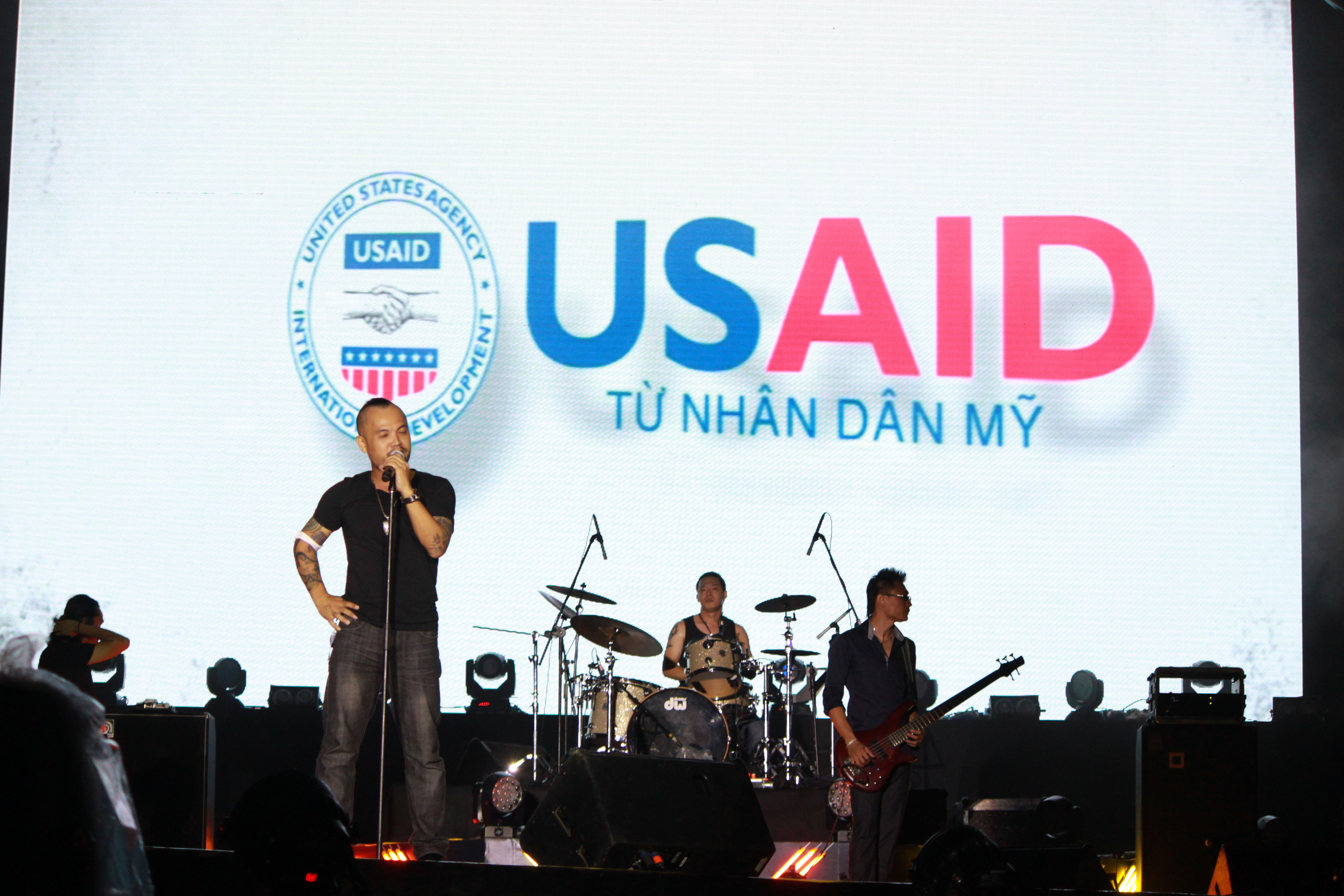
Lập and his band, Bức Tường in 2012

In 2001, Lập announced that Bức Tường would release their debut rock album, titled Tâm hồn của đá (The Soul of Rock) in late September. The following year, the band hosted a live performance of their debut album (this was also their first live performance); it was estimated that about 10,000 people attended the first rock show in Vietnam. Although this show was prepared carefully and was well received, Lập regretted that the show was not as successful as he had expected. The live show was named one of 10 notable Vietnamese cultural events of that year. In the same live show, Bức Tường presented some new songs that would be featured in their second CD, released in late 2001.

In 2003, Bức Tường had a live performance in the Visages Francophones Music Festival in France. In 2004 in an interview with channel VTV3, Lập said that he had added the band's best songs from two albums, Tâm hồn của đá (The Soul of Rock) and Vô hình (Invisible) to the setlist of a performance named "Bông hồng thủy tinh" ("Crystal Rose") that was held in Phan Đình Phùng Arena. A year later, Bức Tường became the first Vietnamese band (and the only Vietnamese band at that time) to embark on a national tour. Four performances were held in Hanoi, Haiphong, Da Nang and Ho Chi Minh City. After the success of the show "Những hòn đá lăn" ("The Rolling Stones") in November, Bức Tường was ready to release their fourth album with many new songs.

In 2006, Lập's Bức Tường announced that they would give a farewell show named "Last Saturday". The band's fans who were not in Hanoi could watch the show on Voice of Vietnam. "Last Saturday" took place at the Giảng Võ Exhibition Center in Hanoi, and 20,000 fans attended; it was the largest audience of any of Bức Tường's shows. Lập explained the band's break-up by citing conflicting issues in rock music in Vietnam, both in the local music scene and in the organization of events.

After a four-year hiatus, on the Millennial Anniversary of Hanoi, Lập and his bandmates reunited and released their fourth album Ngày khác (Other Days), which showed a significant change in their musical style from hard rock/metal to modern rock (or alternative rock). The album's CD cover art included the tattoo on Lập's right hand. A year later, they performed a show called "Nhiệt" ("Heat"). The band was one of the acts performed at the ASEAN Rock Music Festival in Indonesia. In 2013, they performed for the television show "Dấu ấn" ("Legacy") in Nguyen Du Arena in Ho Chi Minh City. Lập commented that, although the show's running time was not enough for the band to perform all their songs, they were able to showcase their "main characteristics". On 14 December, Lập and his bandmates performed on tour in Da Nang; this show was well received by Vietnamese rock fans.

=== Other activities ===
In the summer of 2007, Lập performed his song "Dế mèn" ("Cricket") in the opening ceremony of Kim Đồng's Children's Book Fair that was held in Hanoi's Children's Palace. In the same year, he served as a Goodwill Ambassador for the Asian Football Confederation. Starting in 2008, for three consecutive years he served as Rock Storm's programming director for a variety of events. During the final performance of "Rock Storm 2009", Lập performed three of his notable songs, "Ngày hôm qua" ("Yesterday"), "Cơn mưa hoang dã" ("Wild Rain"), and the signature song "The Road to Glory Days".

In 2012, Lập was one of the judges in the gameshow The Voice of Vietnam (season 1). He created the nickname "From Heaven to Hell" for his 14-member team. He attracted attention after supporting and praising the singer Bảo Anh, even though she had been criticized by others as "a disaster", and letting her pass the show's qualifying rounds, drawing many critical comments from the online community. A few days later there was an angry public reaction when he responded to the criticism by saying "leave us alone, don't mess with us". Criticism of Lập's bias towards Bảo Anh intensified. Some said that Lập was damaging his own image through his decisions on that show. There was public criticism of Lập's role and the staging of the first season of The Voice of Vietnam. In 2013, he released an autobiography titled "Bên kia Bức Tường" ("On the Other Side of The Wall") that focused on his rock music career and his tenure with Bức Tường. In 2015, he appeared on the cover of Men's Culture and Sports magazine.

== Later years ==
=== Cancer ===
On 4 November 2015, Lập revealed on his fanpage that he had "begun a fight with cancer", after which he received messages of encouragement from Tuấn Hưng, Chí Trung, Phạm Anh Khoa, and others. Lập had been diagnosed with colorectal cancer that had metastasized. On the evening of 6 November, Lập underwent nearly four hours of surgery to remove a colorectal tumor; by noon of the next day he awoke and said that he was fine. While the public was shocked by the news of Lập's cancer, he reassured them and conveyed an optimistic outlook, even saying that "it was just like a dream".

After learning of Lập's severe condition, Bức Tường's current and former bandmates and other musicians performed in support of Lập's cancer treatment. Lập's final performance, "Bức Tường và những người bạn: Đôi bàn tay thắp lửa" ("Bức Tường and Their Friends: Hands Lighting a Fire"), was held on 16 January 2016. Lập wrote a song for that show that was dedicated to his wife. In spite of his severe condition, which made him perform in a wheelchair, his appearance was described as "healthy and charming...with a great vocal". The show lasted nearly 12 hours, and this made a strong impression and brought out an emotional response by the public. About two months before his death, during the cold season in Hanoi, Lập visited and gave presents to sick children.

=== Death ===
Lập died at noon on 17 March 2016 in his home in Hanoi, at age 41. On 23 March 2016, his funeral was held in the Ministry of Defence's Funeral House, located on Lê Thánh Tông Street, Hanoi. Initially, Lập was to have been buried in his hometown cemetery in Vụ Bản district, Nam Định province. However, according to Lập's last wishes and his family's request, he was buried in Thiên Đức Cemetery, Phù Ninh district, Phú Thọ province.

== Personal life ==
Lập was married in 2003; he had a son and a daughter. His wife, Ngô Thị Mai Hoa, is a physician in the Central Maternity Hospital.

Lập's first tattoo was an angel tattoo that he got when he was 18 years old. He said that the tattoos were connected with "unforgettable moments" during his 10-year rock music career. In an online interview with the Vietnamese electronic magazine Zing, he revealed a Sagittarius tattoo chosen for his zodiac sign. He also had each family member's name tattooed on his chest.

Lập was not keen on travelling around Vietnam on Tết or other holidays. He said that on those days he usually stayed home, watching movies or playing tennis. His hobby was backpacking with one of his cruiser motorcycles. He was the owner of many cruisers, from heavy vehicles to various lines of Magma, Steed, Shadow, and others. In 2006, he bought an Intruder 800 motorcycle, valued about US$3,000 at that time.

== Legal issues ==
=== Lawsuit against Zing MP3 ===
On 3 December 2014, the People's Court of Ho Chi Minh City heard a civil lawsuit for digital rights against the VNG Corporation. In the lawsuit Lập accused VNG of having kept a recording of his song "The Road to Glory Days" uploaded on the music website Zing MP3 for a long time without his permission. He requested a total compensation of 150 million Vietnamese đồng (equivalent to 9,600 USD in 2025), including his songwriting fee of over 55 million Vietnamese đồng, compensatory damages of 50 million Vietnamese đồng because he was not able to release a new album featuring that song, and 50 million Vietnamese đồng for his attorney's fees.

VNG did not agree to pay compensation to Lập and claimed that, although they are the owners of the mp3.zing.vn website, Zing MP3's recorded audio content was uploaded by users and not by them. They stated that this service is a streaming platform, and that VNG does not manage its users' digital content. Then VNG asked Lập to withdraw his lawsuit and sign a contract with them. The judge extended the case and would return a verdict on 10 December. This was the first time a lawsuit about internet copyright was adjudicated in Vietnam.

On 10 December 2014, the judge dismissed the case after Lập agreed to withdraw his lawsuit. He and VNG reached an out-of-court settlement regarding the use of Bức Tường's audio recordings on Zing MP3.

== Honors and legacy ==
Two days after Lập's death, the president of the Vietnam Musicians Association announced that it and the Ministry of Culture, Sports and Tourism would award him a posthumous honorary medal. In 2017, a performance titled "Trần Lập – Hẹn gặp lại" ("See You Again") was held in tribute to Lập. Almost all of Bức Tường's thirty songs (all written by Lập) have been covered by numerous bands and artists, such as Microwave, Ngũ Cung, Tùng Dương, Anh Khoa, and Tạ Quang Thắng. A liveshow was organized in 2018 as a realization of Lập's unfinished ideas during his lifetime.

Two years after Lập's death, Bức Tường reunited for a show titled "Ngày trở về" ("Return Date"). Bức Tường had a competition to determine whom to add to the band's line-up in their national tour in 2019.

The current leader of Bức Tường, guitarist Trần Tuấn Hùng, revealed that Lập would be featured in a special way on the live show "Trở về" ("Return") held at the Hanoi University of Civil Engineering. In the show "Music Home" that aired on channel FPT on 28 May 2021, Lập's wife for the first time told stories of his early life and revealed secrets about the beauties mentioned in his songs. In 2022, a documentary about Bức Tường titled Những bức tường (The Walls) was released. The film, with a running time of 116 minutes, follows Bức Tường's struggles and comeback after their leader died.

In 2015, Lập was nominated posthumously for the "Musician of the Year" award. In 2016, the Dedication Music Award committee announced that they would honor Lập posthumously the following year. In 2017, Lập won a VTV "Person of the Year" award. In 2021, five years after his death, Lập again received a nomination at the Dedication Music Awards.

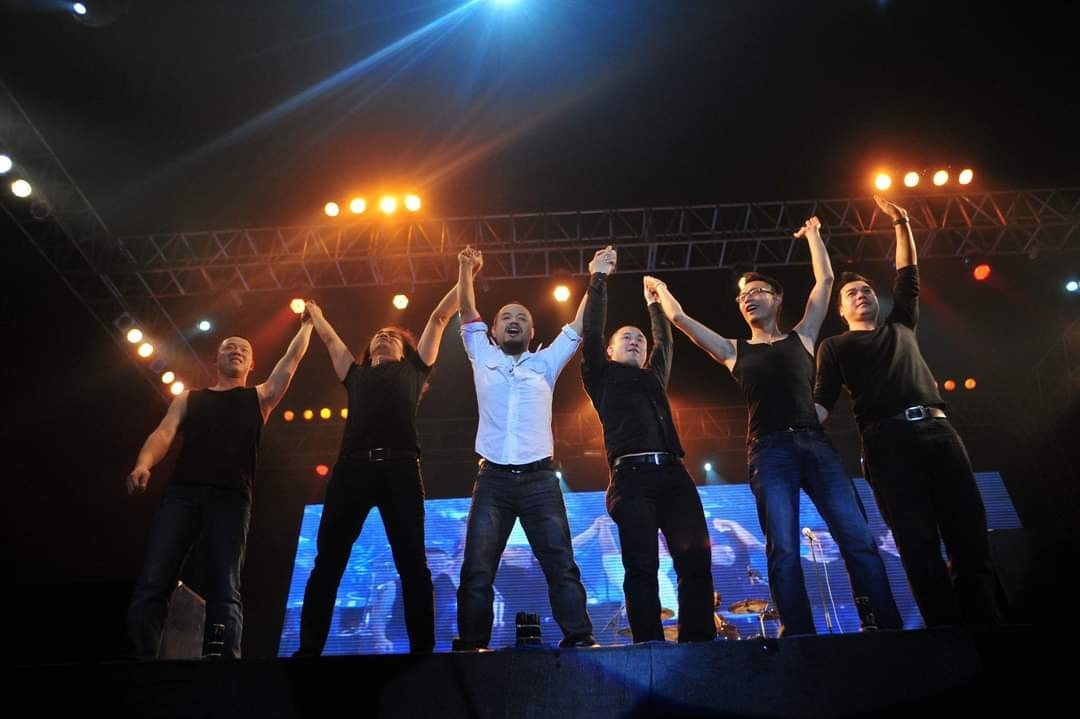
Lập (center, white shirt) with Bức Tường band in a liveshow named Nhiệt in 2011.

Lập and his band were among the pioneers of Vietnamese rock music. According to VnExpress, "when people listen to their music, they find a fire of passion, an intense love of life." Among Lập's songs, "The Road to Glory Days" is considered especially notable because it highlights his (and Bức Tường's) features. In many cultural, social, and sporting events, "The Road to Glory Days" is played when the Vietnamese flag appears. During his lifetime, Lập not only established himself in Vietnam's rock scene, but also starred in film and television and served as an ambassador, consultant, executive producer and director of music shows.

Lập also received some criticism during his tenure with Bức Tường. Some claimed that the band "just played trivial rock music", to which Lập replied that "there is no such concept in the world's rock music". After a Bức Tường performance in 2011 that drew over 7,000 fans, VnExpress wrote that "Trần Lập occasionally lost his voice" and that "time has had a significant impact on his voice".
