= Bức Tường =

Vietnamese glam metal band

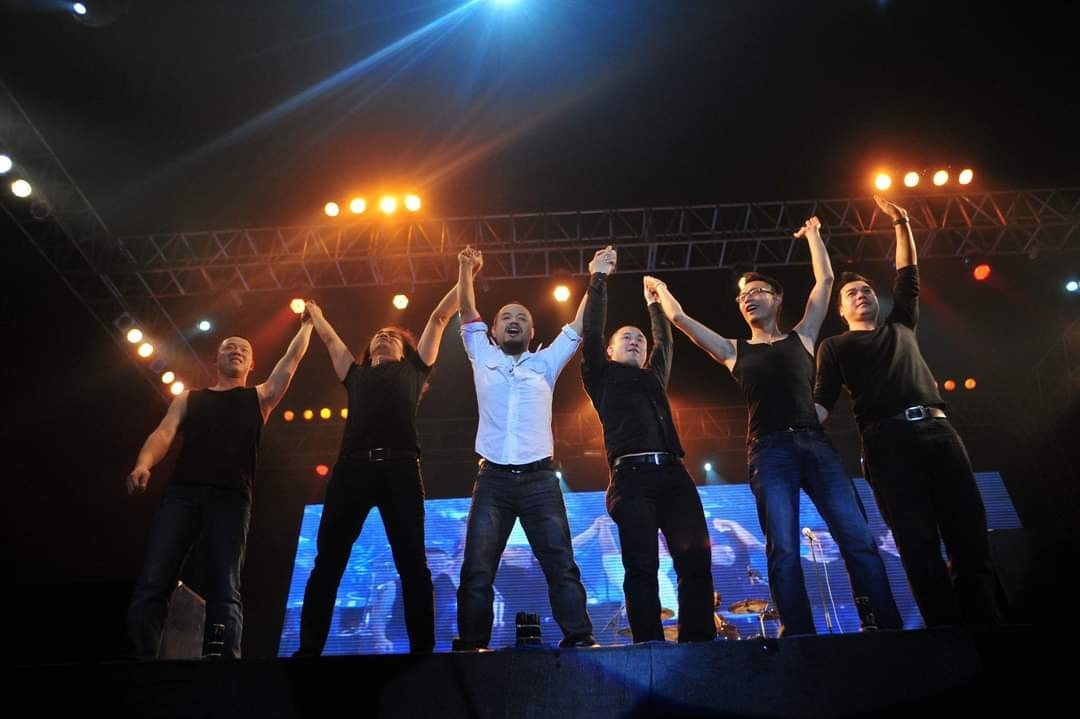
- Bức Tường in 2011.

Background information
- Origin: Hanoi, Vietnam
- Genres: Hard rock, heavy metal
- Years active: 1995–2006; 2010–present
- Labels: Thang Long Audio & Visual
- Members: Trần Tuấn Hùng; Tăng Xuân Kiên (Kiên Cun); Vũ Văn Hà; Phạm Trung Hiếu
- Past members: Trần Lập (deceased); Nghiêm Mạnh Tuấn; Trần Quốc Khánh; Nguyễn Hoàng; Trần Nhất Hoàng; Nguyễn Duy Hùng; Nguyễn Đức Hiệp; Phan Thanh Bình; Trần Hồng Trường; Võ Anh Tuấn; Nguyễn Minh Đức

Bức Tường (English: The Wall) are a Vietnamese glam metal band, formed in 1995 from Vietnam's National University of Civil Engineering in Hanoi. The band is one of the first professional rock bands in Vietnam, and is considered to be the leader of Hanoi's rock scene.

== History ==
In early 1996, Bức Tường had the opportunity to introduce themselves to the students and national audience with the song "We are Bức Tường" or "We're the Wall" in the opening game of SV96 between three teams: Hanoi University of Technology, National Economics University, and National University of Civil Engineering. Then, four years later, in the SV2000 finale, with upbeat tunes, vibrant of "Bình minh sinh viên 2000" and "Đường đến ngày vinh quang" or "Road to the glory", Bức Tường had impressed the audiences. This event was remarkable and a turning point in their musical career.

The band was chosen as the representative of Vietnamese contemporary music to attended the Festival "Vietnamese Faces – French Faces", which is organized in Cahors, France, from 26 September to 7 October 2003.

On 25 April 2004, Bức Tường became the first band to perform a live concert in Music and friends of VTV3.

In November 2005, Bức Tường was the first band to tour across Vietnam. 4 concerts "9 +" was continuously held in Hanoi, Hai Phong, Da Nang and Ho Chi Minh City.

After nearly 12 years, on 2 December 2006, a farewell concert called "The Last Saturday" was held. It took place in front of 20,000 fans at the Giảng Võ Exhibition Center in Hanoi, and is considered the largest concert with the biggest number of fans in all of Bức Tường's concerts.

=== Death of Trần Lập ===
In November 2015, the band's lead singer Trần Lập was diagnosed with rectal cancer. In January 2016, Bức Tường held their last live show with him, "Hand of Fire", in Hanoi, attracting 15,000 spectators. On 17 March 2016, five months after being diagnosed with cancer, Lập died at his home in Hanoi.

== Discography ==
=== Albums ===
- Tâm hồn của đá (2002)
- Vô hình (2003)
- Nam châm (2004)
- Ngày khác (2010)
- Đất Việt (2014)
- Con đường không tên (2020)
- Cân bằng (2023)
- TIX3 ( 2026)

=== Singles ===
- "Đường đến ngày vinh quang" (2002)
- "Những ngày tháng tuyệt vời" (2019)
