= Paul Clark (keyboardist) =

English pewterer and finance writer (1715–1760)

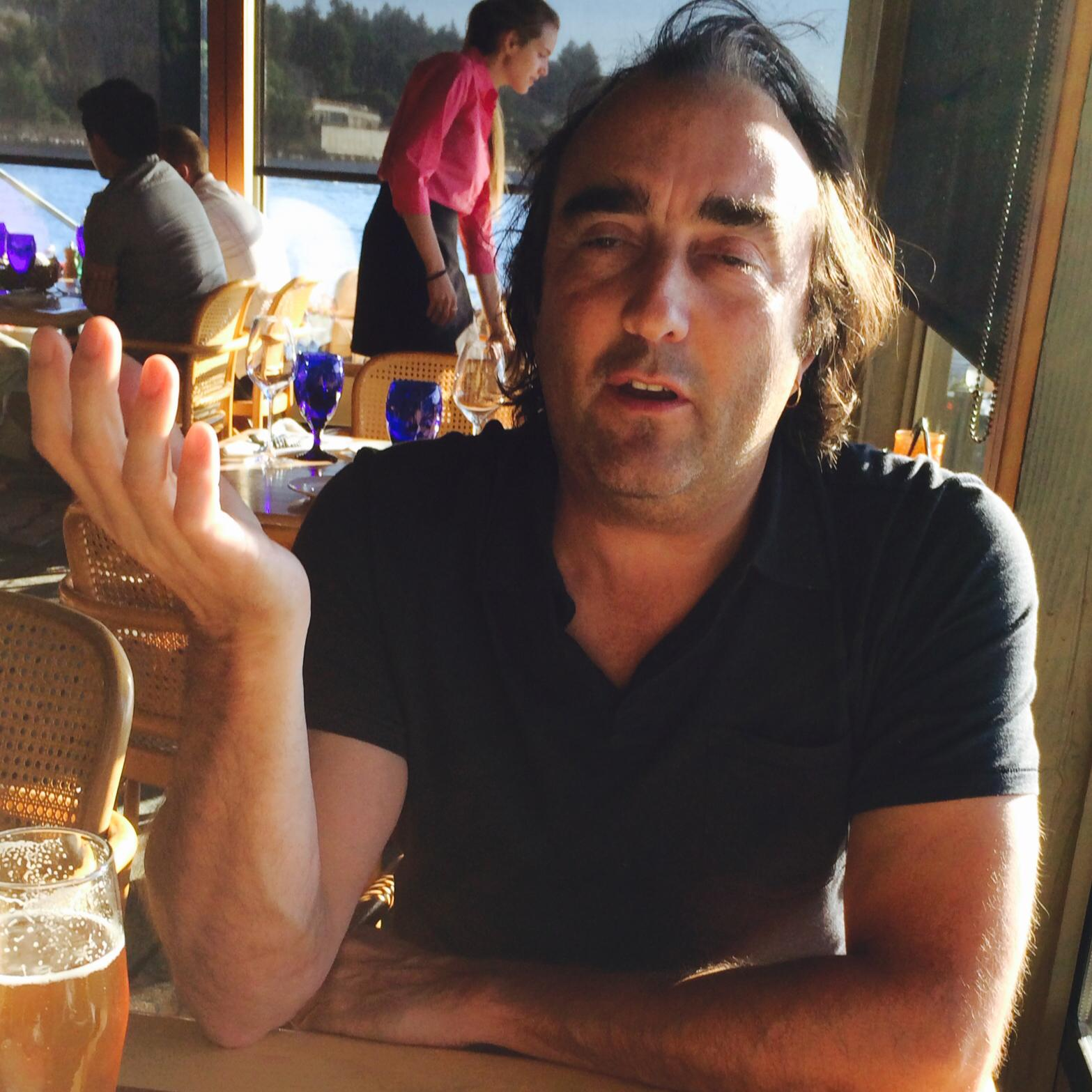

Background information
- Born: 12 June 1962 (age 63); Leeds, Yorkshire, England
- Genres: Post-punk, electronic
- Occupation(s): Musician, photographer
- Instrument(s): Digital audio workstation, synthesizer, analog modular synthesizer, theremin, guitar, mechanical keyboards
- Website: Paul Clark

Paul Clark is an English musician best known as the keyboard player of post-punk band the Bolshoi. As a solo electronic artist, he released a digitally remixed collection of analog four-track recordings originally recorded between 1989 and 1991 titled Starship Oak, and is currently working on a new album with producer Mick Glossop titled Merciana.

== Career ==
Shortly after moving to London, Clark formed The Intimates with Jo Broadberry (Jo Broadberry and The Standouts), Danique Osborne and Drew. Mick Rossi (Slaughter and The Dogs) and John Altman (Nick Cotton in Eastenders) also made appearances on their only recording. It was around this time that Clark was introduced to Mick Ronson and shortly afterwards met the Bolshoi manager Pete McCarthy.

Clark later joined as keyboard player and a few weeks later made his first appearance with the band at what turned out to be their first sold-out show at the Marquee Club on London's Wardour Street. Several months later, the band recorded Friends, their first full-length album, at Townhouse Two, with producer Mick Glossop.

After moving to Seattle Clark continued work on his solo recording.

While continuing to record music for a solo record, Clark purchased electronicmusic.com in 1995.

Granbretan, released under the name Verdant Set, was released in April 2017.

In November 2022 Vive Le Rock magazine published an article announcing the formation of a group consisting of the founding members of The Bolshoi, Trevor Tanner and Paul Clark.

== See also ==
- Beggars Banquet
