= Reverend Zen =

American rock/blues/jazz group

- Origin: Katonah, New York, United States
- Genres: Rock, R&B, jazz, blues
- Years active: 2006-present
- Members: Jack Evans, Rob Aries, Kjell Benner, Chris Carter, Margaret Dorn, Rudy Feinauer, James Gerard, Sherryl Marshall, Nick Moroch, Gil Parris, Kip Sophos, Vaneese Thomas, Soozie Tyrell, Chris Vitarillo, Wayne Warneck
- Website: Website

Reverend Zen is a New York rock/blues/jazz group that debuted in 2006 with their album, Angels, Blues & the Crying Moon, released by Blakjak Music Records / Anamosa Songs ASCAP c2006. In 2015 the band released their ten-song video collection entitled Reverend Zen The Videos in association with Blakjak Music Records / Anamosa Songs ASCAP c2015. In 2019 the band released their single "Magdalena - New Wings" on Blakjak Music Records / Anamosa Songs ASCAP c2019.

The band was formed by Jack Evans, who is also the group's lead singer and drummer.

== Recognition ==
The album and the band have won seventy five worldwide music industry awards:

- 2017 Winner Jango Radio / Radio Airplay Summer Song Contest - NYC
- 2016 Semi Finalist Australia Song Contest - Sydney
- 2016 Runner Up Song of the Year Contest - Houston
- 2015 Finalist Great American Song Contest - Portland
- 2015 Semi Finalist UK Song Contest - London
- 2011/12 ASCAP Plus Award -NYC
- 2010/11 ASCAP Plus Award - NYC
- 2010 Semi Finalist UK Song Contest - London
- 2009/10 Song of the Year Nomination with 9 Finalist Awards from ABC Radio Networks Fame Games Effigy Awards - Spain
- 2009/10 ASCAP Plus Award - NYC
- 2009 Semi Finalist UK Song Contest -London
- 2009 Semi Finalist Australia Song Contest - Sydney
- 2008/09 Artist of the Year Nomination and 7 Finalist Awards from ABC Radio Networks Fame Games Effigy Awards - Spain
- 2008/09 ASCAP Plus Award - NYC
- 2008 Best Song Nomination Los Angeles Music Awards - Los Angeles
- 2008 Best Song Nomination Toronto Exclusive Magazine Awards - Toronto
- 2008 Finalist with 2 Semi Finalist Awards France's 100% Song Contest - Paris
- 2008 Semi Finalist UK Song Contest - London
- 2008 Semi Finalist Australia Song Contest - Sydney
- 2008 Golden Wave Artist of the Year Award - The Colorado Wave - Indie Music Wave shows I Radio LA - Denver
- 2007/08 Song of the Year and Artist of the Year Nomination with 5 Finalist Awards ABC Radio Networks Fame Games Effigy Awards - Spain
- 2007/08 2 Finalist Awards Unisong International Song Contest - Los Angeles
- 2007/08 ASCAP Plus Award NYC
- 2007 Artist of the Year with 4 Best Song Nominations Los Angeles Music Awards - Los Angeles
- 2007 Artist of the Year WCH Radio - St. Louis
- 2006/07 2 Finalist Awards Unisong International Song Contest - Los Angeles
- 2006 Bronze Artist Award RGW Radio - Norfolk, UK
- 2006 Finalist with 5 Runner Up Awards VH1 Song of the Year Contest - Houston/ NYC
- Additional, multiple awards in the Billboard World Song Contest - NYC, the Mid Atlantic Song Contest - Washington, DC and the UK Singer/Songwriter Awards - London.

The album was co-written by Evans and James Gerard.

== Angels, Blues & the Crying Moon Track listing ==
1. "Magdalena" (4:41)
2. "Bad Attitude" (4:35)
3. "Don't Try to Tell Me" (4:18)
4. "The Boston Shakedown" (4:09)
5. "Only a Fool" (4:46)
6. "My Sigmund Freud" (4:42)
7. "Her Love" (5:12)
8. "Dangerous Times" (3:12)
9. "Boy Genius' (4:46)
10. "The One in Love" (4:52)

== Compilations ==
Reverend Zen appeared on compilation albums:

- Fresh Produce 4 (2007) MVY Radio - Martha's Vineyard, Nantucket, Cape Cod, Newport, RI
- Music For Coffee Beings (2007) RPW Records - Vancouver, Canada
- Songwriters & Storytellers 2007 Indie Artist Alliance - San Francisco
- Just Talents (2007) Research Music - Miami, Rio de Janeiro, Berlin
