= Lead vocalist =

Member of a band who sings the main solo vocal portions of a song

The lead vocalist in popular music is typically the member of a group or band whose voice is the most prominent melody in a performance where multiple voices may be heard. The lead singer sets their voice against the accompaniment parts of the ensemble as the dominant sound. In vocal group performances, notably in soul and gospel music, and early rock and roll, the lead singer takes the main vocal melody, with a chorus or harmony vocals provided by other band members as backing vocalists. Lead vocalists typically incorporate some movement or gestures into their performance, and some may participate in dance routines during the show, particularly in pop music. Some lead vocalists also play an instrument during the show, either in an accompaniment role (such as strumming a guitar part), or playing a lead instrument/instrumental solo role when they are not singing (as in the case of lead singer-guitar virtuoso Jimi Hendrix).

The lead singer also typically guides the vocal ensemble and band with visual cues to indicate changes of tempo or dynamics, stops or pauses, and the starts of new sections (unless there is also a conductor onstage, as with a big band or unless an instrumentalist bandleader is providing this role). The lead vocalist also typically speaks to the audience between songs, to give information about a song (such as who wrote it or why it was chosen), introduce the band members, and develop rapport with the audience. The lead vocalist may also play a leadership role in rehearsals, unless there is a bandleader who takes on this role. If the lead singer is a singer-songwriter, they may write some or all of the lyrics or create entire songs (including chords and melodies).

Examples of a lead vocalist in rock music are Freddie Mercury from Queen and Mick Jagger from the Rolling Stones. Similarly in soul music, Smokey Robinson was the lead singer of The Miracles. There may be two or more lead vocalists in a band who rotate singing lead between songs or within songs, such as with The Beatles or Fleetwood Mac, or two or more vocalists may share lead vocals on the same lines, as was often the case with ABBA.

== Terminology ==
The lead vocalist may also be called the main vocalist or lead singer. Especially in rock music, the lead singer or solo singer is often the front man or front woman, who may also play one or more instruments and is often seen as the leader or spokesman of the band by the public.

In K-pop, the lead vocalist is often referred to as a vocalist with the second-best vocal technique.

== History ==
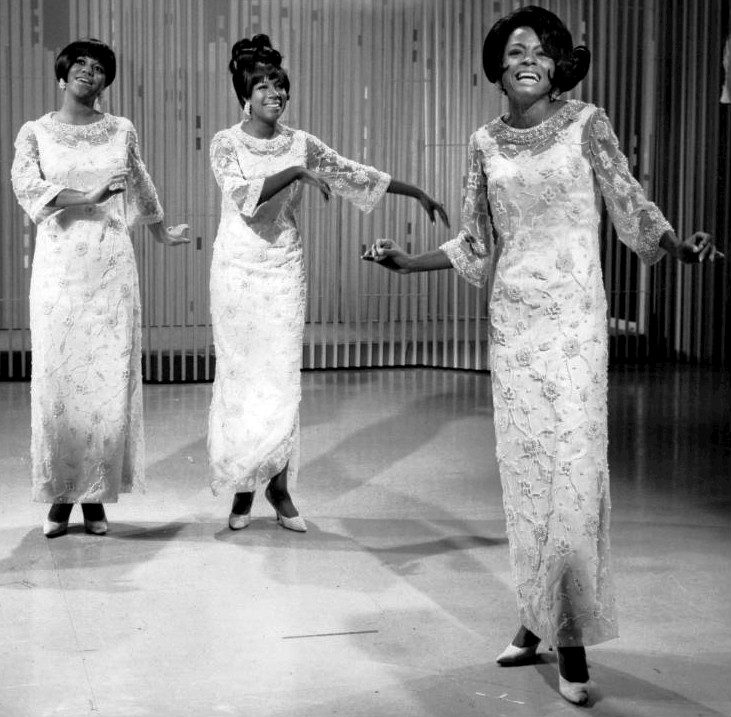
Diana Ross (front) performing lead vocals on the Supremes' "My World Is Empty Without You" with Florence Ballard and Mary Wilson harmonizing

It is uncertain when the term "lead vocals" was first used, but it may have emerged in the late 1930s, when rich vocal interplay with multiple voices where one or more voices may dominate began to impact on North American popular music, which was previously dominated by solo vocals. The practice of using a lead singer in vocal groups, however, has a longer history: an early form is the "call and response" found in work songs and spirituals sung by African-American slaves. Songs of the late nineteenth century frequently used a leading solo voice (or "call"), followed by a choral response by other singers. As the style developed through early commercial recordings and performances in the early 20th century, the role of the lead vocalist became more established, although popular groups of the 1930s and 1940s such as the Ink Spots and the Mills Brothers generally used different lead singers on different songs rather than keeping the same lead singer throughout. By the 1950s, singers such as Sam Cooke (with the Soul Stirrers) and Clyde McPhatter (with the Drifters) took on more clearly defined roles as lead singers, and by the end of the decade credited group names often changed to reflect the leading roles of the main vocalists, with examples such as Frankie Lymon & the Teenagers and Dion & the Belmonts.

Academic David Horn has written:

The influence of American rhythm and blues recordings may well be a crucial one in the assimilation of the format of lead singer plus backing group into the guitar-based British 'beat' groups of the 1960s, and in American groups such as The Beach Boys. From these various points – including Motown – it went on to become a standard device in much rock and pop music. In some bands – most famously, The Beatles – the role of lead singer alternated (in this case, principally between two performers), while in others – for example, Herman's Hermits – one lead singer dominated.

== Characteristics and exceptions in rock and pop music ==
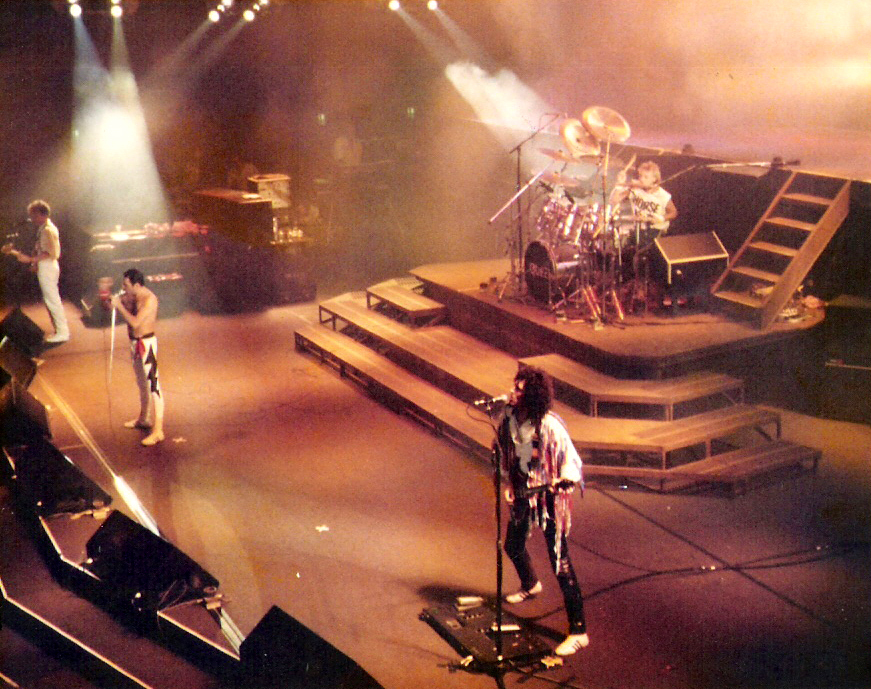
Queen performs in a typical rock band layout during a 1984 concert. Lead singer (front man) Freddie Mercury stands centre-stage in front of drummer Roger Taylor and positioned between bass guitarist John Deacon and lead guitarist Brian May.

There are as many types and styles of lead singer as there are styles and genres of music. However, the lead singer of a group or band is usually the main focus of audiences' attention. The lead vocalist of band is sometimes called the "front man" or "front woman", as the most visible performer in a group. While most bands have a single lead singer, many others have dual lead singers or other members of the band that sing lead on particular songs. The lead singer often defines the group's image and personality to the general public.

In rock music, the lead singer is often the band's leader and spokesperson. While lead singers or spokespersons for any musical ensembles can be called a front man, the term is used very widely in rock music. Since the position commonly has an expanded role from simple lead vocalists, there have been cases in which the front man for a band is someone other than the lead vocalist. For example, while the lead vocalist for the band Fall Out Boy is guitarist Patrick Stump, the bassist and lyricist, Pete Wentz, is generally called the front man, both in the media and by the band members themselves, since he represents the band in most interviews and contributes most to the band's image in the popular media.

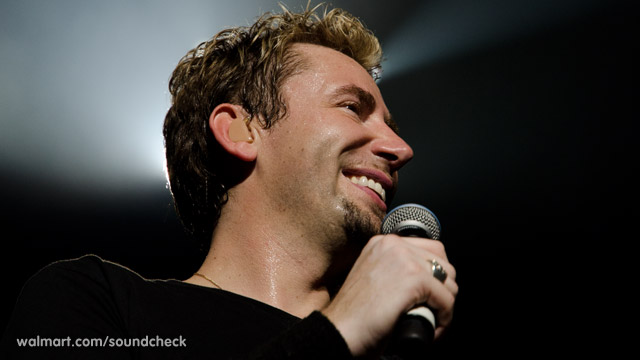
Lead singers, such as Nickelback's Chad Kroeger, are often perceived as the public face of a band.

== See also ==
- List of lead vocalists
