= Trevor Tanner =

British musician and composer

- Born: 30 December 1962 (age 63)
- Genres: Post-punk, alternative rock, gothic rock
- Instrument: Guitar
- Years active: 1978–present
- Label: Emperor Penguin Recordings

Trevor Tanner (born 30 December 1962) is a British musician and composer, best known as the singer and guitarist of post-punk/gothic rock band the Bolshoi during the 1980s. He has a solo career via Emperor Penguin Recordings.

== Post-Bolshoi career ==
Trevor Tanner, working closely with Emperor Penguin Recordings (EPR) Creative Director David Paul Wyatt Perko, has been slowly releasing solo recordings. Tanner's first release on Emperor Penguin Recordings was an elaborate 3-CD boxed set (the three volumes are also available individually), Bullish, Bellyache & Belch, released in 2004. The set consists of 41 songs in total, hand-picked by Perko out of a pool of well over 100 Tanner works-in-progress.

Tanner's fourth release on Emperor Penguin Recordings, the 16-track work Eaten by the Sea, became available for digital download on iTunes on 11 March 2008. The CD was released on 20 May 2008.

Trevor Tanner, via Emperor Penguin Recordings, released an iTunes Digital 45 entitled The Ballad of Edgar Allan Poe on 13 July 2011.

On 31 August 2011, Tanner's fifth solo album, Musical Charlatan, became available. It was a grassroots self-release not associated with Emperor Penguin Recordings.

After the release of the Bolshoi's Lindy's Party, the Bolshoi recorded a fourth album, but problems with their record label management impeded its release, and they disbanded as the 1980s drew to a close. The previously unreleased fourth album, Country Life, had been lost for years but has been resurrected by Beggar's Banquet with extensive help from Tanner's current record label head and Creative Director David Paul Wyatt Perko. This new release is now available as one of five CDs in a 5-CD box set put out via Beggar's imprint The Arkive.

Tanner then began working on a follow-up to Beggar's 5-CD box set, creating all-acoustic project Trevor Tanner's the Bolshoi Favourites No. 1, released on CD and double vinyl by Tanner's label Emperor Penguin Recordings' (EPR) on 6 September 2016.

He is working on a new project with The Bolshoi keyboardist Paul Clark, called The Bolshoi Brothers.

== Discography ==
- Bullish, Bellyache & Belch (3-CD boxed set) (2004)
- Eaten by the Sea (CD) (2008)
- The Ballad of Edgar Allan Poe (iTunes, digital 45) (2011)
- Musical Charlatan (Double-CD) (2011)
- Trevor Tanner's the Bolshoi Favourites No. 1 (CD + double vinyl) (2016)
- Trevor Tanner GOODBYE ZIGGY STARDUST (2025)
