= Jack Evans (musician) =

American musician and songwriter

Jack Evans (born March 3, 1953, Anamosa, Iowa) is an American musician and songwriter.

Evans, a 1978 graduate of Boston's Berklee College of Music with a Bachelor of Music Composition Degree, went on to form the award-winning band Reverend Zen. The New York band's first album was Angels, Blues, and the Crying Moon on Blakjak Music Records, Anamosa Songs ASCAP c2006. The group's ten song video collection entitled Reverend Zen The Videos was released in 2015 in association with Blakjak Music Records, Anamosa Songs ASCAP c2015. In 2019 the band released their single "Magdalena - New Wings" on Blakjak Music Records, Anamosa Songs ASCAP c2019. He's won seventy five songwriting and performance awards with Reverend Zen around the world including:

- 2017 Winner Jango Radio / Radio Airplay Summer Song Contest - NYC
- 2016 Semi-finalist Australia Song Contest - Sydney
- 2016 Runner Up Song of the Year Contest - Houston
- 2015 Finalist Great American Song Contest - Portland
- 2015 Semi-finalist UK Song Contest - London, UK
- 2011/12 ASCAP Plus Award – N.Y.C.
- 2010/11 ASCAP Plus Award – N.Y.C.
- 2010 Semi-finalist UK Song Contest – London, UK
- 2009/10 Artist of the Year Nomination & 2009/10 Song of the Year Nomination with 9 Finalist Awards ABC Radio Networks Fame Games Effigy Awards, Costa del Sol Spain / N.Y.C.
- 2009/10 ASCAP Plus Award – N.Y.C.
- 2009 Semi-finalist UK Song Contest – London, UK
- 2009 Semi-finalist Australia Song Contest – Sydney, Australia
- 2008/09 Artist of the Year Nomination and 7 Finalist Awards ABC Radio Networks Fame Games Effigy Awards – Costa del Sol, Spain / N.Y.C.
- 2008/09 ASCAP Plus Award – N.Y.C., 2 Finalist Awards
- 2008/09 Unisong International Song Contest – Los Angeles
- 2008 Best Song Nomination Los Angeles Music Awards – Los Angeles
- 2008 Best Song Nomination Toronto Exclusive Magazine Awards – Toronto, Canada
- 2008 Finalist with 3 Semi-finalist Awards France's 100% Song Contest – Arville / Paris, France
- 2008 3 Semi-finalist Awards UK Song Contest – London, UK
- 2008 Semi-finalist Award Australia Song Contest – Sydney, Australia
- 2008 Golden Wave Artist of the Year Award – The Colorado Wave – Indie Music Wave shows I Radio LA – Denver/Los Angeles
- 2007/08 Song of the Year & 2007/08 Artist of the Year Nominee with 5 Finalist Awards ABC Radio Networks Fame Games Effigy Awards – Costa del Sol, Spain / N.Y.C.
- 2007/08 ASCAP Plus Award – N.Y.C.
- 2007 Artist of the Year with 4 Best Song Nominations Los Angeles Music Awards
- 2007 Artist of the Year WCH Radio – St. Louis, 2 Finalist Awards
- 2007/08 Unisong International Song Contest – L.A.
- 2006 Bronze Artist Award RGW Radio – Norfolk, UK
- 2006 Finalist VH1 Song of the Year Contest with 5 Runner-up Awards – Houston/N.Y.C.

He has also won multiple awards from the Billboard World Song Contest – N.Y.C., the Mid Atlantic Song Contest – Washington, D.C., and the Singer/Songwriter Awards in London, U.K.

== Involvement in Reverend Zen ==
Evans is the lead singer and drummer of Reverend Zen, and put together the band with over 10 other musicians. Some of those musicians have performed with Bruce Springsteen, Sting, Stevie Wonder, Eric Clapton, Annie Lennox, Elvis Costello, Shawn Colvin, Donald Fagen, John Scofield, B.B. King, David Sanborn, Sheryl Crow, Aretha Franklin, John Mayer, Joni Mitchell, Albert Collins, Michael Jackson. Evans and Reverend Zen also appear on the compilation releases "Fresh Produce 4" c2007 from MVY Radio – Martha's Vineyard, Nantucket, Cape Cod, Ma., Newport, R.I., "Music For Coffee Beings" c2007 from RPW Records – Vancouver, Canada, "Songwriters & Storytellers" c2007 from Indie Artist Alliance – San Francisco, Ca., "Just Talents" c2007 from Research Music – Miami, Fla., Rio de Janeiro, Brazil, Berlin, Germany.
