= The Bolshoi =

British band

- (Left to right: Nick Chown, Jan Kalicki, Trevor Tanner, Paul Clark)

Background information
- Origin: Trowbridge, Wiltshire, England
- Genres: Post-punk; gothic rock; alternative rock; new wave
- Years active: 1984–1988, 1999 (studio only), 2023-present
- Labels: Situation Two; Beggars Banquet; I.R.S.
- Spinoffs: The Bolshoi Brothers
- Past members: Trevor Tanner; Jan Kalicki; Paul Clark; Nick Chown; Graham Cox
- Website: TheBolshoi.co.uk

The Bolshoi are a London-based English music group prominent mostly in the mid- to late 1980s. They are best known for the hits "Sunday Morning" and "A Way" or "Away" (the names are interchangeable and both have been cited on different album/single releases).

== History ==
The band formed in 1984 in Trowbridge, Wiltshire, England. The original lineup consisted of singer/guitarist Trevor Tanner, drummer Jan Kalicki, and bassist Graham Cox. Tanner and Kalicki had previously played together in the short-lived punk band Moskow, where Trevor performed as Trevor Flynn (his mother's maiden name). Early gigs supported the likes of the Cult, the March Violets and the Lords of the New Church. After eight gigs bass player Graham Cox was replaced by Nick Chown. In 1985, the band released their debut single, "Sob Story", followed by the mini-album, Giants, and their hit song "Happy Boy". Word of mouth was such that the Bolshoi were able to sell out many of their early headlining performances.

The band moved to London in 1985, and their line-up expanded to include Paul Clark on keyboards (born 12 June 1962, Leeds, Yorkshire). In 1986, they released their first full-length album, Friends, and expanded their touring schedule to the U.S., South America and Poland. It was followed in 1987 by the album Lindy's Party, on which the sound was more pop-oriented. TC Wall, reviewing the album in Underground magazine, described Lindy's Party as "completely confident, commercial, professional, and dangerously catchy" and "a fine album that'll be caressed for generations."

Stylistically, the Bolshoi were difficult to categorize. The band has been described as a proto-goth band, similar in their live act to fellow Beggars Banquet signees Bauhaus. Tanner was recognized for his dark, pensive lyrics that belied a social responsibility and awareness.

After the release of Lindy's Party, the band recorded a fourth album. However, problems with their record-label management impeded its release, and they disbanded in 1988. The previously unreleased fourth album, titled Country Life, had been lost for years, but was later released by Beggars Banquet with extensive help from Tanner's current record label-head and creative director, David Paul Wyatt Perko.

In December 2018, the Bolshoi's official Facebook page announced that frontman Trevor Tanner and keyboardist Paul Clark were developing a new project, tentatively called the Bolshoi Brothers.

In November 2022, following the launch of their website, the Bolshoi Brothers released the song "Steam Funk." In 2025, the duo finally unleashed their self-titled debut album, which includes the aforecited track.

== Members ==
Former members

- Trevor Tanner – lead vocals, guitars (1983-1988)
- Jan Kalicki – drums, backing vocals (1983-1988)
- Graham Cox – bass, backing vocals (1983-1985)
- Paul Clark – keyboards, guitar, backing vocals (1986-1988)
- Nick Chown – bass, backing vocals (1985-1988)

== Discography ==
=== Studio albums ===
- 1986: Friends
- 1987: Lindy's Party - UK Albums #100
- 1988: Country Life (released 2015)

=== Compilations ===
- 1990: Bigger Giants (Beggars Banquet Records)
- 1999: A Way - Best of the Bolshoi (Beggars Banquet Records)
- 2006: A Life Less Lived: The Gothic Box (Rhino Records)
- 2015: The Bolshoi 5 CD Box Set (The Arkive)

=== Extended plays ===
- 1985: Giants - UK Indie #17

=== Singles ===
- 1985: "Happy Boy" - UK Indie #29
- 1985: "Sob Story"
- 1986: "Books on the Bonfire"
- 1986: "Away" - UK Singles #100
- 1986: "Sunday Morning"
- 1987: "T.V. Man"
- 1987: "Away II"
- 1987: "Please"
- 2024: "Dolores Jones 2023"
