= Hanoi University of Civil Engineering =

Hanoi University of Civil Engineering (HUCE)
- Trường Đại học Xây dựng Hà Nội
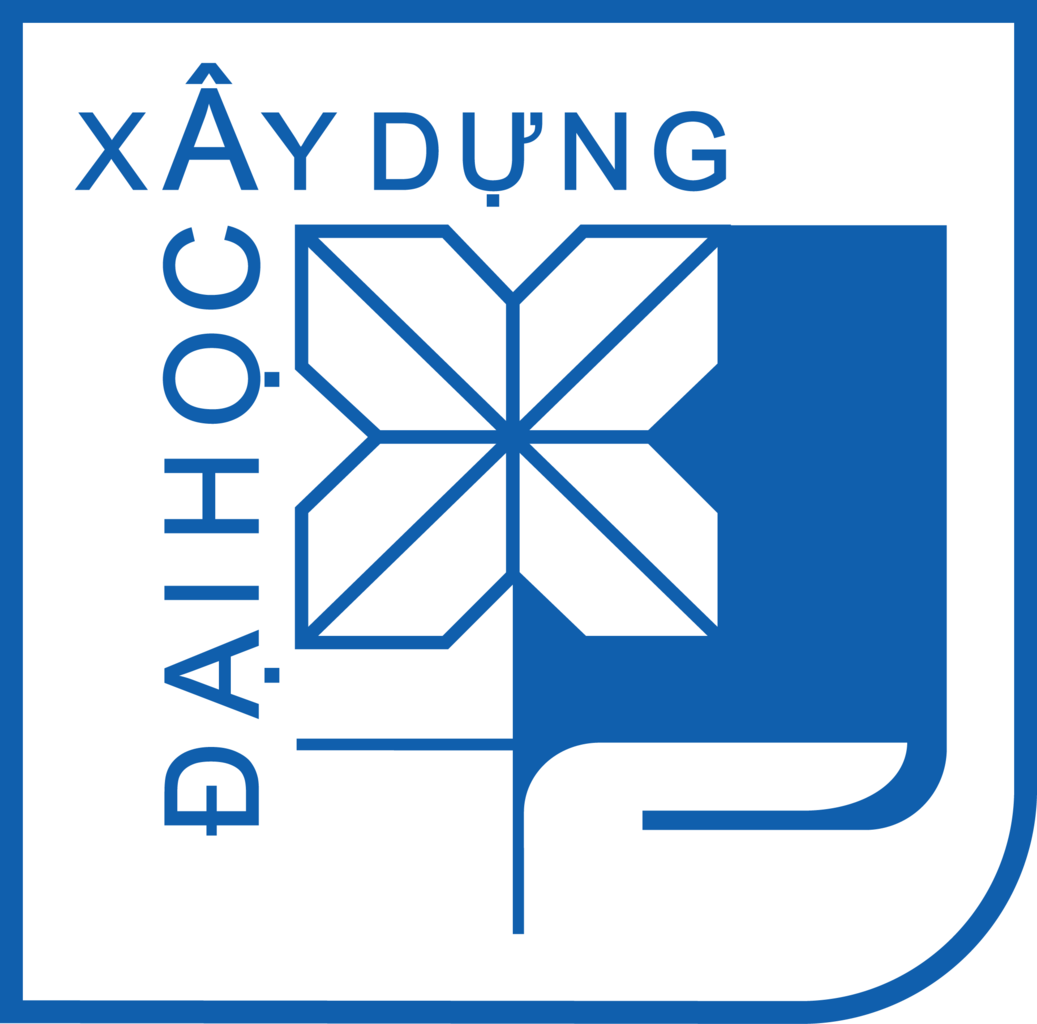
- Main Auditorium
- Type: Public University
- Established: 1966
- Chancellor: Assoc. Prof. Dr. Pham Duy Hoa
- Administrative staff: 699
- Undergraduates: approx. 18,000
- Postgraduates: approx. 2,000
- Location: No.55, Giải Phóng Avenue, Hai Bà Trưng Ward, Hanoi, Vietnam
- Website: en.huce.edu.vn

The Hanoi University of Civil Engineering (HUCE; Vietnamese: Trường Đại học Xây dựng Hà Nội), formerly known as the National University of Civil Engineering (NUCE), is a public higher education institution in Vietnam. The university is one of the leading universities and among the top seven engineering universities in Vietnam.

HUCE is one of four universities participating in educating high-qualified engineers of Vietnamese–French courses. The university also has French-language civil engineering courses supported by AUPELF – a global network of French-speaking higher-education and research institutions.

HUCE was officially founded in 1966 in Hanoi. It is considered to be a large university, teaching more than 18,000 undergraduate students and 2000 post-graduate students. The teaching staff is 699 specialists. The university has international partners which allows its students to participate in exchange programs.

The university has 14 faculties and 54 departments, 16 laboratories and workshops. It offers bachelor's, master's and doctoral degrees. The main campus is in the Hanoi capital, district of Hai Ba Trung.

The university has educated over 60,000 engineers and architects with more than 5,000 masters and doctors. Different generations of the university's lecturers and students have been working throughout the country, contributing profoundly to the national defense and development.

== History ==
=== Foundation ===
In 1956, Hanoi University of Technology established the Faculty of Civil Engineering.

In 1966, according to Decision No. 144/CP dated August 8, 1966, the Faculty of Civil Engineering was officially separated into the University of Civil Engineering.

During the Vietnam War, the University of Civil Engineering was evacuated to Huong Canh, Vinh Phuc province. After peace was restored, in 1982, the school began planning to move back to Hanoi. At the end of 1983, the school officially moved back to Hanoi but was dispersed in four different locations: Co Nhue, Phuc Xa, Bach Khoa and Dong Tam.

In 1991, the university was relocated to Dong Tam ward, Hai Ba Trung district, Hanoi; and has remained there ever since.

In 2014, the university planned for a new experimental facility in Ha Nam with an area of 24ha.

In 2016, the construction of the H3 lecture hall was completed with a total area floor of 13000m²

In 2017, the university became one of the first four Vietnamese universities to achieve international accreditation standards recognized by the High Council for Evaluation of Research and Higher Education (HCERES).

In 2021, according to Decision No. 1396/QD-TTg dated August 13, 2021, of the prime minister of the Socialist Republic of Vietnam, signed by Deputy Prime Minister Vu Duc Dam, the National University of Civil Engineering was changed to Hanoi University of Civil Engineering.

=== Development ===
Over 60 years of training, 50 years of establishment and development, each step taken by the Hanoi University of Civil Engineering has been closely linked with the development of the industry, the Capital and the country.

The university have developed to become a multi-disciplinary training university offering educational opportunities from graduate to PhD levels as well as to be one of the leading centers in researching and applying scientific and technological advancements in the field of civil engineering and construction. Until now, the university has educated over 60,000 engineers and architects with more than 5,000 masters and doctors. Different generations of the university's lecturers and students have been working throughout the country, contributing to the national defense and development.

With all these considerable achievements, the National University of Civil Engineering has been granted many distinguished rewards. In 2016, on its 50th anniversary, the National University of Civil Engineering was awarded the First-class Independence Order for the second time.

== Campuses ==
University's campus in Hanoi has a total area of 3.9 ha, including lecture halls of H1 (6 floors) and H2 (4 floors), Library (4 floors), Laboratory (10 floors), Sports Centre (1403m^{2}), convention hall of G3 (900 seats), Administrative Offices of A1 (6 floors) and Dormitory (7464m2/1500 beds). Currently, the university is building its Experimental Training Centre in Nam Cao Residential Area, Phu Ly city of Ha Nam province with an area of over 24 ha.

=== Lecture halls ===
- Total area of lecture halls H1, H2, H3, C4 and laboratory: 17,000 m^{2}
- Total number of classrooms: 99 (50–150 seats/room)
- Laboratory and Workshops: 16

=== Library ===
- Total area: 3590 m^{2} with 705 seats, including:
- Domestic material reading room: 160 seats
- Foreign material reading room: 70 seats
- Computer-based reading and searching room: 95 seats
- Reading room for PhD learners and lecturers: 35 seats
- Multi-media room: 45 seats
- Self-studying rooms for students: 300 seats

=== Textbooks and documents ===
- Textbook room: 118,878 books
- Domestic material reading room: 20,390 books
- Foreign material reading room: 38,404 books

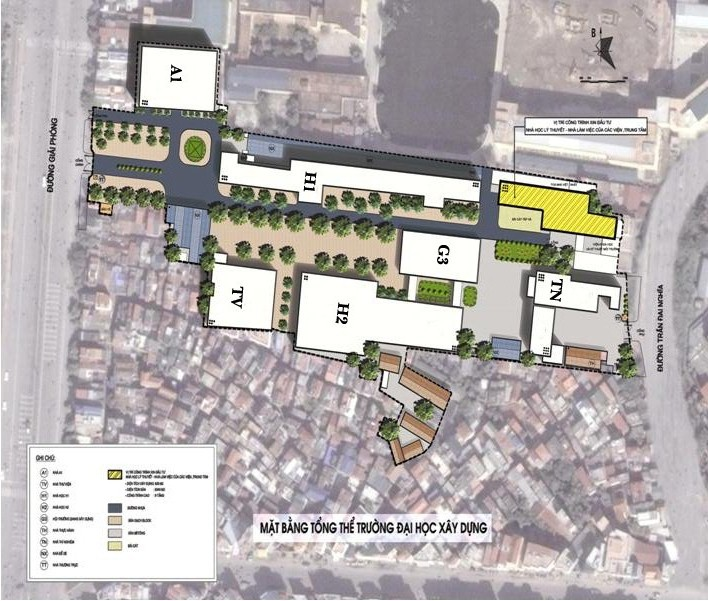

== Academic profile ==
=== Faculties ===
The university has fourteen faculties:

1. Faculty of Architecture and Planning
2. Faculty of Bridge and Road Engineering
3. Faculty of Building Materials
4. Faculty of Civil and Industrial Construction
5. Faculty of Economics and Construction Management
6. Faculty of Environmental Science and Engineering
7. Faculty of Hydraulic Engineering
8. Faculty of Information Technology
9. Faculty of International Education
10. Faculty of Marine and Petroleum Engineering
11. Faculty of Mechanical Engineering
12. Faculty of National Defense Education
13. Faculty of Political Education
14. Faculty of Post-graduate Studies

=== Enrollment ===
Every year, it admits over 3500 undergraduate students and 500 graduate students, coming from all over the country and international students.

=== Education quality ===
A degree from the HUCE was evaluated as comparable to four-year bachelor's degree in civil engineering obtained in Canada by International Qualification Assessment Service (IQAS).

Many graduates of HUCE have been admitted into leading North American, Australian and Western European universities for their postgraduate education.

=== The university’s chancellor ===
Term	Name
1966–1977	People's Teacher – NGUYEN SANH DAN
1977–1982	Prof. Dr. DO QUOC SAM
1982–1989	Prof. Doctor of Science. People's Teacher – PHAM NGOC ĐANG
1989–1994	Prof.Doctor of Science. People's Teacher – NGUYEN VAN CHON
1994–1999	Prof. Doctor of Science. Merit Teacher – NGUYEN NHU KHAI
1999–2004	A/Prof. Dr. Merit Teacher – NGUYEN LE NINH
2004–2009	A/Prof. Dr. Merit Teacher – NGUYEN VAN HUNG
2009–2014	Dr. LE VAN THANH
2014-now	A/Prof. Dr. PHAM DUY HOA

== Link ==
- Hanoi University of Civil Engineering's Website
- List of universities in Vietnam
