= Richie Kotzen discography =

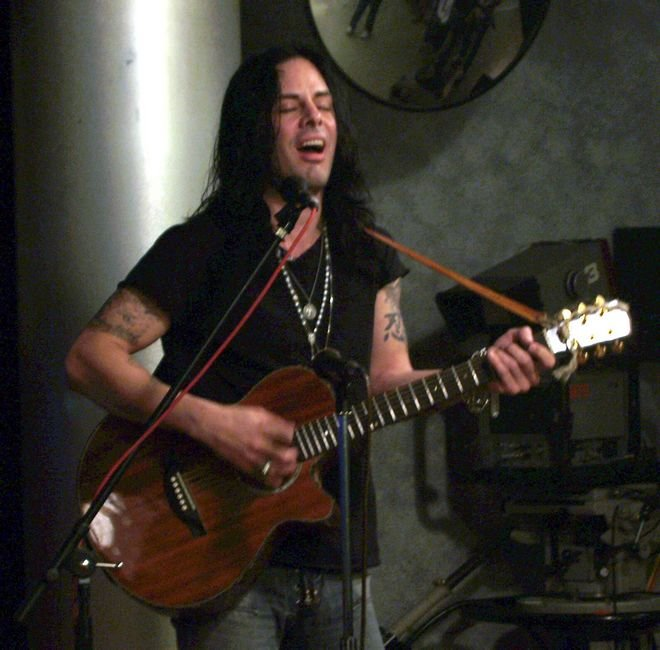
Kotzen performing in 2007

This is the discography for American rock musician Richie Kotzen.

== Solo ==
=== Studio albums ===
- (1989) Richie Kotzen
- (1990) Fever Dream
- (1991) Electric Joy
- (1994) Mother Head's Family Reunion
- (1995) The Inner Galactic Fusion Experience
- (1996) Wave of Emotion
- (1997) Something to Say
- (1998) What Is...
- (1999) Bi-Polar Blues
- (1999) Break It All Down
- (2001) Slow
- (2003) Change
- (2003) Acoustic Cuts
- (2004) Get Up
- (2006) Ai Senshi Z×R (Music from the animation series Gundam)
- (2006) Into The Black
- (2007) Go Faster/Return Of The Mother Head's Family Reunion
- (2009) Peace Sign
- (2011) 24 Hours
- (2015) Cannibals
- (2017) Salting Earth
- (2020) 50 for 50
- (2024) Nomad

=== Live albums ===
- (2008) Live In São Paulo/Bootlegged In Brazil

=== EPs ===
- (1996) Times Gonna Tell (EP)

=== Compilations ===
- (2004) The Best Of Richie Kotzen (Greatest Hits)
- (2006) Instrumental Collection: The Shrapnel Years
- (2010) A Best of Collection
- (2010) A Ballads Collection
- (2011) I'm Coming Out
- (2014) The Essential

== As band member ==
Year	Band	Title	Notes
1988	Arthurs Museum	Gallery Closed	EP
1993	Poison	Native Tongue	Studio
1993	Poison	Seven Days Live	Live
1995	Richie Kotzen & Greg Howe	Tilt	Studio
1997	Richie Kotzen & Greg Howe	Project	Studio
1999	Vertú (project with Stanley Clarke and Lenny White)	Vertú	Studio
1999	Mr. Big	Get Over It	Studio
2000	Mr. Big	Deep Cuts	Greatest Hits
2001	Mr. Big	Actual Size	Studio
2002	Mr. Big	In Japan	Live
2005	Forty Deuce	Nothing to Lose	Studio
2009	Wilson Hawk (project with Richie Zito)	The Road	Studio
2013	The Winery Dogs	The Winery Dogs	Studio
2014	The Winery Dogs	Unleashed in the East / Unleashed in Japan	Live
2015	The Winery Dogs	Hot Streak	Studio
2017	The Winery Dogs	Dog Years	EP
2017	The Winery Dogs	Dog Years: Live in Santiago	Live
2021	Smith/Kotzen (project with Adrian Smith from Iron Maiden)	Smith/Kotzen	Studio
2021	Smith/Kotzen (project with Adrian Smith from Iron Maiden)	Better Days	EP
2023	The Winery Dogs	III	Studio

== Collaborations ==
- (1992) L.A. Blues Authority II: Blues (with Glenn Hughes)
- (1993) The Electric Pow Wow (with Stevie Salas)
- (1994) Rats (with Sass Jordan)
- (1995) Tilt (with Greg Howe)
- (1996) Sticky Wicked (with TM Stevens)
- (1996) Ground Zero (with TM Stevens)
- (1996) Only You (with TM Stevens)
- (1997) Project (with Greg Howe)
- (1999) Radio Active (with TM Stevens)
- (1999) Not So Innocent (with Jesse's Powertrip)
- (2000) Mikazuki in Rock (with Mikazuki Tekkodan)
- (2000) Submarine (with Gregg Bissonette)
- (2000) From The Archives Vol. 1 – Incense & Peaches (with Glenn Hughes)
- (2003) All That I'd Be (with Steve Saluto)
- (2004) Nowhere to Go (with Takayoshi Ohmura)
- (2004) ***Hole (with Gene Simmons)
- (2006) Rough Beat (with Steve Saluto)
- (2006) Avalon (with Richie Zito)
- (2006) Erotic Cakes (with Guthrie Govan)
- (2007) Emotions in Motion (with Takayoshi Ohmura)
- (2007) Live for Tomorrow (with Marco Mendoza)
- (2008) Supermihl & Superfriends (with Andy Susemihl)
- (2009) Lavish Lifestyle (with Tah Mac, DJ Lethal & Tony Deniro)
- (2010) Resurrection (with Steve Saluto)
- (2010) You Can't Save Me – Remix (with Clarence Jey & Steve Mcleod)
- (2021) Smith/Kotzen (with Adrian Smith)

== Various artists albums ==
- (1991) Bill & Ted's Bogus Journey: Music from the Motion Picture
- (1992) The Guitars That Rule The World – Vol. 1
- (1994) L.A. Blues Authority Volume V: Cream Of The Crop
- (1996) Crossfire – (A Tribute to Stevie Ray Vaughan)
- (1997) Black Night – Deep Purple Tribute According To New York
- (2000) Bat Head Soup: A Tribute to Ozzy
- (2001) Stone Cold Queen: A Tribute to Queen
- (2002) One Way Street: A Tribute To Aerosmith CD
- (2002) An All Star Lineup Performing The Songs Of Pink Floyd
- (2004) Influences & Connections – Vol. 1: Mr. Big
- (2004) Spirit Lives On: The Music Of Jimi Hendrix Revisited Vol. 1
- (2005) Numbers From The Beast – An All Stars Salute To Iron Maiden
- (2010) Siam Shade Tribute

== Videography ==
- (1989) Rock Chops
- (1993) 7 Days Live (Live shot concert with Poison)(re-released 2006)
- (1994) Mother Head's Family Reunion DVD
- (1994) Mother Head's Family Reunion (Video-clip from the Mother Head's Family Reunion Album)
- (1996) Wave of Emotion (Video-clip from the Wave of Emotion Album)
- (1997) Something To Say (Video-clip from the Something To Say Album)
- (2001) Don't Wanna Lie (Video-clip from the Slow Album)
- (2001) Shine (Video-clip from Mr. Big's Actual Size Album)
- (2002) Hi-Tech Rock Guitar
- (2004) Losin' My Mind (Video-clip from the 'Get Up' album)
- (2007) Live In South America
- (2008) Chase It (Video-clip from the R.O.T.M.F.R. Album)
- (2008) Bootlegged in Brazil
- (2009) Everything Good (Video-clip from Wilson Hawk 'The Road' Album)
- (2009) Paying Dues (Video-clip from 'Peace Sign' Album filmed by Kotzen's daughter at home)
- (2010) Larger Than Life (Video-clip from 'Peace Sign' Album filmed by Kotzen's)
- (2011) Behind Blue Eyes (Acoustic Video-clip filmed by Kotzen's)
- (2011) 24 Hours (Video-clip from '24 Hours' Album filmed by Kotzen's)
- (2013) Elevate (Video-clip with The Winery Dogs)
- (2013) Desire (Video-clip with The Winery Dogs)
- (2013) I'm No Angel (Video-clip with The Winery Dogs)
- (2013) Time Machine (Video-clip with The Winery Dogs)
- (2014) Walk With Me (Video-clip from 'The Essential')
- (2014) War Paint (Video-clip from 'The Essential')
- (2014) Regret (Piano Version) (Video-clip filmed by Kotzen's)
- (2014) Unleashed in Japan (DVD with The Winery Dogs)
- (2014) Cannibals (Video-clip from the 'Cannibals' album)
- (2014) You (Video-clip from the 'Cannibals' album)
- (2015) In An Instant (Video-clip from the 'Cannibals' album)
- (2015) The Enemy (Video-clip from the 'Cannibals' album)
- (2015) Richie Kotzen Live DVD
- (2015) Oblivion (Video-clip with The Winery Dogs)
- (2015) Fire (Acoustic Version) (Video-clip with The Winery Dogs)
- (2016) Captain Love (Video-clip with The Winery Dogs)
- (2016) Hot Streak (Video-clip with The Winery Dogs)
- (2017) End Of Earth (Video-clip from the 'Salting Earth' album)
- (2017) My Rock (Video-clip from the 'Salting Earth' album)
- (2017) Dog Years - Live in Santiago & Beyond (DVD with The Winery Dogs)
- (2018) The Damned (Video-clip for the single)
- (2018) Riot (Video-clip for the single)
- (2019) Venom (Video-clip for the single)
- (2020) Devil's Hand (Video-clip from the '50 for 50' album)
- (2020) As You Are (Video-clip from the '50 for 50' album)
- (2020) Raise The Cain (Video-clip for the single)
- (2021) Taking My Chances (Video-clip from the 'Smith/Kotzen' album)
- (2021) Scars (Video-clip from the 'Smith/Kotzen' album)
- (2021) Running (Video-clip from the 'Smith/Kotzen' album)
- (2021) Solar Fire (Video-clip from the 'Smith/Kotzen' album)
- (2021) Better Days (Video-clip from the 'Better Days' EP)
