= Losin' My Mind =

Losin' My Mind may refer to:

- "Losin' My Mind", a 2004 song by En Vogue from Soul Flower
- "Lost" (Gorilla Zoe song), a 2008 song by Gorilla Zoe, originally leaked as "Losin' My Mind"
- "Losin' My Mind", a 2014 song by Kiesza featuring Mick Jenkins from Sound of a Woman
- "Losin' My Mind", a 1995 song by Mad CJ Mac from True Game
- "Losin' My Mind", a 2004 song by Richie Kotzen from Get Up
- "Losin' My Mind", a 2010 song by Tech N9ne from Bad Season

== See also ==
- Lose My Mind (disambiguation)
- Losing My Mind (disambiguation)
- Lost My Mind (disambiguation)
- Lost in My Mind (disambiguation)
