= Collection: The Shrapnel Years (Greg Howe album) =

Compilation album by Greg Howe
- Released: October 10, 2006
- Recorded: 1988–2003 at various locations
- Genre: Instrumental rock, jazz fusion, neo-classical metal
- Length: 56:42
- Label: Shrapnel
- Producer: Greg Howe, Mike Varney

Greg Howe chronology
Extraction (2003)	Collection: The Shrapnel Years (2006)	Sound Proof (2008)

Professional ratings
Review scores
Source	Rating
AllMusic	4.5/5 stars

Collection: The Shrapnel Years is a compilation album by guitarist Greg Howe, released on October 10, 2006, through Shrapnel Records.

== Track listing ==
All tracks are written by Greg Howe.

No.	Title	Original album	Length
1.	"Bad Racket"	Greg Howe	3:39
2.	"Jump Start"	Introspection	4:40
3.	"No Place Like Home"	Introspection	4:23
4.	"Faulty Outlet"	Uncertain Terms	4:23
5.	"Howe 'Bout It"	Parallax	5:30
6.	"Joker's Wild"	Parallax	5:59
7.	"Quiet Hunt"	Five	5:59
8.	"Three Toed Sloth"	Five	4:13
9.	"Abrupt Terminal"	Ascend	5:47
10.	"Blindfold Drive"	Hyperacuity	6:12
11.	"Crack It Way Open"	Extraction	5:57
Total length:			56:42

== Personnel ==
- Greg Howe – guitar, guitar synthesizer, keyboard (except tracks 9, 11), drums (track 4), bass (tracks 4, 9), engineering, production
- Vitalij Kuprij – keyboard (track 9)
- David Cook – keyboard (track 11)
- Atma Anur – drums (tracks 1, 8)
- Kevin Soffera – drums (tracks 2, 3, 10), udu
- Jon Doman – drums (tracks 5, 6, 9)
- Dennis Chambers – drums (track 11)
- Billy Sheehan – bass (track 1)
- Alsamad Caldwell – bass (track 2)
- Vern Parsons – bass (track 3), engineering
- Andy Ramirez – bass (tracks 5, 6)
- Kevin Vecchione – bass (tracks 7, 8)
- Dale Fischer – bass (track 10)
- Victor Wooten – bass (track 11)
- Steve Fontano – engineering
- Mark Gifford – engineering
- Mark Rafferty – engineering
- Mike Varney – production
