= Instrumental Collection: The Shrapnel Years =

Compilation album by Richie Kotzen
- Released: June 2006
- Recorded: 1989–2003
- Genre: Instrumental rock
- Length: 51:10
- Label: Shrapnel
- Producer: Jason Becker, Mike Varney, Richie Kotzen

Richie Kotzen chronology
Ai Senshi Z×R (2005)	Instrumental Collection: The Shrapnel Years (2006)	Into The Black (2006)

Professional ratings
Review scores
Source	Rating
Allmusic	4/5 stars

Instrumental Collection: The Shrapnel Years is a compilation album by guitarist/vocalist Richie Kotzen, including instrumental songs from several albums through his career.

== Track listing ==
All songs written by Richie Kotzen

No.	Title	Length
1.	"Squeeze Play"	4:38
2.	"Strut It"	4:10
3.	"Unsafe At Any Speed"	3:14
4.	"Cryptic Script"	3:55
5.	"B Funk"	4:19
6.	"Acid Lips"	4:45
7.	"Hot Rails"	3:35
8.	"Slow Blues"	4:21
9.	"Pulse"	6:20
10.	"Dose"	5:58
11.	"The Answer"	1:19
12.	"Conflicted"	2:11
13.	"Unity (Jazz Bee Bop Instrumental)"	2:43

== Personnel ==
- Richie Kotzen – electric guitar, wurlitzer piano, bass guitar, keyboards
- Steve Smith – drums (on "Squeeze Play", "Strut It", "Unsafe At Any Speed", "Cryptic Script")
- Stuart Hamm – bass (on "Squeeze Play", "Strut It", "Unsafe At Any Speed", "Cryptic Script")
- Danny Thompson – bass (on "B Funk", "Acid Lips", "Hot Rails", "Slow Blues")
- Atma Anur – drums (on "B Funk", "Acid Lips", "Hot Rails", "Slow Blues")
- Jeff Berlin – bass (on "Pulse" & "Dose")
- Gregg Bissonette – drums (on "Pulse" & "Dose")
