= Five (Greg Howe album) =

Studio album by Greg Howe
- Released: 1996
- Recorded: Greg Howe's home studio in Easton, Pennsylvania
- Genre: Instrumental rock, jazz fusion
- Length: 45:45
- Label: Shrapnel
- Producer: Greg Howe

Greg Howe chronology
Tilt (1995)	Five (1996)	Project (1997)

Five is the fifth studio album by guitarist Greg Howe, released on October 22, 1996 through Shrapnel Records.

== Critical reception ==
Professional ratings
Review scores
Source	Rating
AllMusic	2/5 stars

Andy Hinds at AllMusic gave Five two stars out of five, describing it as sounding much like its three predecessors (Introspection, Uncertain Terms and Parallax). He praised Howe for his "incomprehensibly fast soloing and impeccable note choice" and bassist Kevin Vecchione for his "great enthusiasm brought to the table", but remarked that the album may be "Predictable or dependable, depending on your point of view."

== Track listing ==
All music is composed by Greg Howe, except where noted.

No.	Title	Length
1.	"Just Kiddin'" (Michel Camilo)	5:10
2.	"Sit"	5:34
3.	"Three Toed Sloth"	4:12
4.	"The Terrace"	3:52
5.	"Acute"	4:24
6.	"Quiet Hunt"	6:01
7.	"Bach Mock"	1:14
8.	"Plush Interior"	4:40
9.	"Dusty Maid"	4:56
10.	"Skyline"	5:42
Total length:		45:45

== Personnel ==
- Greg Howe – guitar, keyboard, drums, engineering, mixing, production
- Kevin Vecchione – bass
- Mike Iacopelli – mastering
