= Go Faster (disambiguation) =

Go Faster may refer to:

- ''Go Faster'', a 1999 song by The Black Crowes
- "Go Faster", a 2006 song by Raptile
- Go Faster, a 2007 album by Richie Kotzen
- Go Faster Stripe, an independent film distribution company
