= Soundproof =

Soundproof may refer to:

- Soundproofing
- Sound Proof (album), a 2008 album by Greg Howe
- Soundproof (film), a British television drama film
- Soundproof (album), an album by ApologetiX
- Soundproof (band), English dubstep producers and DJs
