= Into the Black =

Into the Black may refer to:

- "Hey Hey, My My (Into the Black)", a song by Neil Young
- Into the Black (album), an album from Richie Kotzen
- Into the Black (novel), the second novel in the Beyond the Red science fiction trilogy, by Gabe (as Ava Jae)
- "Into the Black" (Sanctuary), a season three episode of Sanctuary
