= Hell If I Know =

Hell If I Know may refer to:

- "Hell If I Know", song by Al Caldwell
- "Hell If I Know", song by Chase Bryant
