= Something to Say =

Something to Say may refer to:

== Albums ==
- Something to Say (Richie Kotzen album), 1997
- Something to Say (Matthew West album), 2008

== Songs ==
- "Something to Say", song by Joe Cocker from his 1972 self-titled album
- "Something to Say", song by The Connells from their 1989 album Fun & Games
- "Something to Say", song by Harem Scarem from their 1991 self-titled debut album

== Other ==
- "Something To Say", a storyline in the science fiction comedy webtoon series Live with Yourself!
