= Extraction (album) =

Studio album by Greg Howe, Dennis Chambers and Victor Wooten
- Released: October 7, 2003
- Recorded: 2001–2003
- Studio: Various: Moore Music Recording Studio in Bath, Pennsylvania; Secret Sound Studio in Baltimore, Maryland; Ashmoon Studio; Greg Howe's home studio in Easton, Pennsylvania; David Cook's home studio in New York City; Victor Wooten's home studio in Nashville, Tennessee
- Genre: Instrumental rock, jazz fusion
- Length: 50:08
- Label: Tone Center
- Producer: Greg Howe

Greg Howe chronology
Hyperacuity (2000)	Extraction (2003)	Collection: The Shrapnel Years (2006)

Victor Wooten chronology
Live in America (2001)	Extraction (2003)	Soul Circus (2005)

Extraction is the tenth studio album by guitarist Greg Howe, in collaboration with drummer Dennis Chambers and bassist Victor Wooten. It was released on October 7, 2003, by Tone Center Records, after a very difficult recording process which spanned two years, resulting in disagreements between the three musicians and Shrapnel Records founder Mike Varney, as well as several delays in the release date.

"A Delicacy" is a re-recording of an instrumental released on Now Hear This, a 1991 album by Howe II (an earlier band formed by Howe). "Proto Cosmos" is a jazz fusion composition by pianist Alan Pasqua that appeared on The New Tony Williams Lifetime's 1975 album Believe It.

== Critical reception ==
Professional ratings
Review scores
Source	Rating
All About Jazz	Neutral
AllMusic	3.5/5 stars

Todd S. Jenkins at All About Jazz gave Extraction a mixed review, describing it as "just about evenly divided between well-crafted, thoughtful compositions and dead-end chops demonstrations." Praise was given to each musician for their technical craft and musical contributions, but criticism was directed at some of the songs for being "pretty much inconsequential filler, the kind of aimless noodling that almost put fusion in its grave a decade ago." Furthermore, he remarked that Howe "tries to say too much at times" and Wooten "tends to fall into the 16th-note babble pattern." Jenkins concluded by saying "Extraction does have its moments, but it's not the most wisely considered entry in anyone's catalog here."

Greg Prato at AllMusic gave the album a more positive review, saying that "the tunes often recall the carefree fusion days of the 1970s [...] As far as modern-day fusion goes, Extraction is pretty darn consistent from front to back". He listed "Crack It Way Open", "Tease", "Ease Up", and the title track as highlights.

== Track listing ==
All tracks are written by Greg Howe except where noted.

No.	Title	Length
1.	"Extraction"	6:13
2.	"Tease"	6:07
3.	"Crack It Way Open"	5:59
4.	"Contigo"	6:30
5.	"Proto Cosmos" (Alan Pasqua)	4:15
6.	"A Delicacy"	2:24
7.	"Lucky 7"	6:02
8.	"Ease Up"	6:20
9.	"Bird's Eye View"	6:18
Total length:		50:08

== Personnel ==
Credits adapted from CD edition liner notes:

- Greg Howe – guitar, guitar synthesizer, keyboards
- David Cook – keyboards
- Victor Wooten – bass guitar
- Dennis Chambers – drums
- Mark Gifford – engineering, mixing
- John Grant – engineering
- Tony Gross – mixing
- Ashley Moore – mastering
