= Captain Love =

Captain Love may refer to:

- Harry Love (lawman)
- Captain Love, 1907 novel by Theodore Goodridge Roberts
- Captain Love (album), by Mock Orange
- "Captain Love", song by The Winery Dogs from Hot Streak (album)
- Captain Love (ja), 1999 video game voiced by Jōji Yanami and others
