= Rachel Z =

American jazz pianist

Rachel Z or Rachel Z Hakim
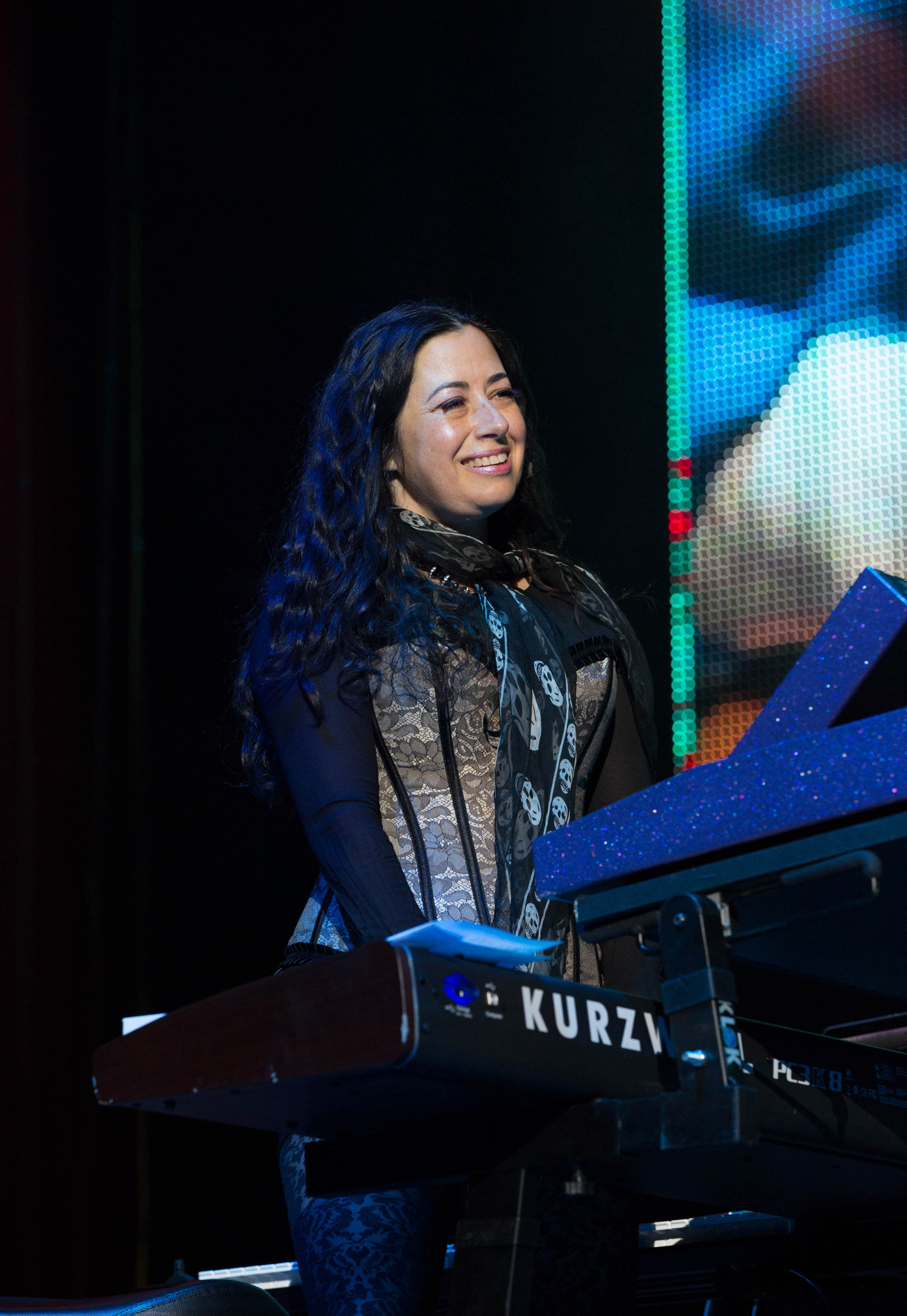

Background information
- Born: Rachel Nicolazzo; New York City, U.S.
- Genres: Jazz, jazz fusion, alternative rock, rock
- Occupation: Musician
- Instrument: Keyboards
- Years active: 1988–present
- Labels: Columbia, GRP, NYC, Savoy, Tone Center, Chesky
- Website: www.rachelz.com

Rachel Carmel Hakim (née Nicolazzo), better known as Rachel Z, is an American jazz and rock pianist and keyboardist. She has recorded 13 albums as a leader and jazz musician. Her musical style, especially her improvisation, has been described as adjacent to Herbie Hancock and McCoy Tyner.

== Career ==
In 1999, Hakim was a part of a jazz fusion project by Stanley Clarke and Lenny White. The project, entitled Vertú, also featured such artists as Karen Briggs on violin and Richie Kotzen on guitar and resulted in an album of the same name that year. She experimented with her own rock group Peacebox as a vocalist. During this time, she was also working with the Neapolitan pop musician Pino Daniele, with whom she first began working in 1996 and toured with until his death in 2015. She toured with Peter Gabriel during his Growing Up tours from 2002 to 2006, which gave Rachel the opportunity to widen her fan base and work with bassist Tony Levin. Her project, entitled "Dept. of Good and Evil", on Savoy received positive reviews.

Hakim and her husband Omar Hakim formed the OZExperience, now "Ozmosys" (Omar and Rachel Z), and in 2019, the new group recorded an EP Eyes to the Future Vol.1 at Power Station. The five-track EP was released on November 4, 2019 with Kurt Rosenwinkel on guitar and Linley Marthe on bass, with J. C. Maillard on additional guitar and voice. The band was hailed at the opening night of the 2019 London Jazz Festival in Jazzwise:

Is Ozmosys heralding or part of a new wave of jazz? Who can fairly say? But this quartet exudes a chemical energy which is invigorated by the jazz canon - without feeling shackled by it - to gaze ahead....Each player is at their unrestrained best. From the potentially explosive timbral variety of Hakim which feeds the thunderous rhythms and eternal dexterity of Marthe, to the harmonic sophistication and (at times) Metheny-esque melodies served up by Rachel Z and Rosenwinkel. The unit of Hakim/Marthe is the rhythmic driving force that tempers the conjuring of Z/Rosenwinkel: it preserves and strengthens the infectious nuggets of melodic and harmonic gold without compromising their complexity. Most fascinatingly of all, it is not just the audience who undergo an osmosis.

== Discography ==
=== As leader ===
- Trust the Universe (Columbia, 1993)
- A Room of One's Own (NYC, 1996)
- Love Is the Power (GRP, 1998)
- On the Milkyway Express (Tone Center, 2000)
- Moon at the Window (Tone Center, 2002)
- First Time Ever I Saw Your Face (Venus, 2003)
- Everlasting (Tone Center, 2004)
- Grace (Chesky, 2005)
- Mortal (ArtistShare, 2006)
- Dept of Good and Evil (Savoy/WEA, 2007)
- I Will Possess Your Heart (Pony Canyon, 2009)
- Sensual (feat. Omar Hakim) (Dot Time, 2024)

=== As a member ===
- Steps Ahead, Yin Yang (NYC, 1990)
- Vertú, Vertú (Sony, 1999)
- The Trio of OZ, The Trio of OZ (OZmosis, 2010)
- The Omar Hakim Experience, We are One (OZmosis, 2014)
- OZmosys, Eyes To The Future, Vol. 1 EP (OZmosis, 2019)

=== As guest ===
With Pino Daniele

- Medina (Sony, 2001)
- Pino Daniele, Francesco De Gregori, Fiorella Mannoia, Ron - In Tour (Sony, 2002)
- Concerto: Medina Live (Sony, 2002)
- Electric Jam (Sony, 2009)
- Boogie Boogie Man (Sony, 2010)
- La Grande Madre (Blue Drag/Sony, 2012)

With Al Di Meola

- Kiss My Axe (Tomato, 1991)
- The Infinite Desire (Universal, 1998)

With Peter Gabriel

- Hit (Real World, 2003)
- Growing Up Live Tour (Real World, 2004)
- Still Growing Up Live & Unwrapped (Real World, 2005)

With others

- Bobby Watson – Urban Renewal (Kokopelli, 1995)
- Regina Carter – Regina Carter (Atlantic Jazz, 1995)
- Wayne Shorter – Highlife (Verve, 1995)
- Wayne Escofferey – Firehouse 12 (Sunnyside, 2013)
- Terri Lyne Carrington – Mosaic 2 (Concord, 2015)

=== Movies ===
With Peter Gabriel

- Growing Up Live (Real World, 2004)
- Still Growing Up Live (Real World, 2005)
- “Al DiMeola Live at the Palladium” (Tomato Records, 1996)
