= Peace Sign (disambiguation) =

The Peace Sign or peace symbol is an internationally recognized symbols for peace.

Peace Sign may also refer to:

- V sign, commonly called the peace sign
- Peace Sign (Paul Hyde album) (2009)
- Peace Sign (Richie Kotzen album) (2009)
- Peace Sign (War album) (1994)
- "Peace Sign" (Kenshi Yonezu song) (2017)
- "Peace Sign", a 2011 song by Lights from Siberia
- "Peace Sign", a 2015 song by Rick Ross from Black Market
