= Collection: The Shrapnel Years =

Collection: The Shrapnel Years may refer to:

- Collection: The Shrapnel Years (Vinnie Moore album), 2006
- Collection: The Shrapnel Years (Greg Howe album), 2006
- Collection: The Shrapnel Years (Tony MacAlpine album), 2006
