= Smith/Kotzen =

Music duo composed of Adrian Smith and Richie Kotzen

- Origin: Turks and Caicos Islands
- Genres: Blues rock; hard rock
- Years active: 2020–present
- Label: BMG
- Members: Adrian Smith; Richie Kotzen
- Website: smithkotzen.com

Smith/Kotzen is the name of a musical collaboration between musicians Adrian Smith of Iron Maiden and Richie Kotzen of The Winery Dogs.

== History ==
The duo met when Smith bought a house and moved to live in Los Angeles part time. Kotzen met and talked with Smith's wife Natalie by chance in a bar, that led to the pair meeting and a friendship developing. Richie and Julia his wife would be invited to parties at the Smiths home where jam sessions would take place, and Natalie eventually suggested the pair write together.

== Smith/Kotzen ==
The writing sessions eventually let to them writing and recording their self-titled debut album, released on March 26, 2021, was described by the Ultimate Classic Rock as a mix of "blues, hard rock, traditional R&B and more." Kotzen also added jazz fusion elements to some sections. Smith/Kotzen was supported by a first single released in January 2021, titled "Taking My Chances".

Both musicians share guitar, bass, vocal, composing and production duties on the album. Kotzen also plays drums on five tracks and Tal Bergman, Richie's longstanding friend and touring partner, replaces him on songs "You Don't Know Me", "I Wanna Stay" and "'Til Tomorrow". The album also features special guest performance from Iron Maiden drummer Nicko McBrain on "Solar Fire".

They undertook their first European tour in 2022 in support of the album, with live members Julia Lage and Bruno Valverde.

== Black Light/White Noise ==
The duo's second album, Black Light/White Noise, was released on March 7, 2025. The lead single, entitled "White Noise", was released on the same day.

The band toured Europe in February 2026 in support of the album, with Kotzen's wife Julia Lage playing bass (who also played bass on 5 songs on the album) and Bruno Valverde on drums.

== Band members ==
=== Current members ===
- Adrian Smith – vocals, guitars, bass (2020–present)
- Richie Kotzen – vocals, guitars, bass, drums (2020–present)

==== Touring musicians ====
- Julia Lage – bass, occasional backing vocals (2022–present;session 2025)
- Bruno Valverde – drums (2022-present;session 2025)

== Discography ==
=== Studio albums ===
- Smith/Kotzen (2021)
- Black Light/White Noise (2025)

=== Extended plays ===
- Better Days (2021)
