= Karen Briggs (musician) =

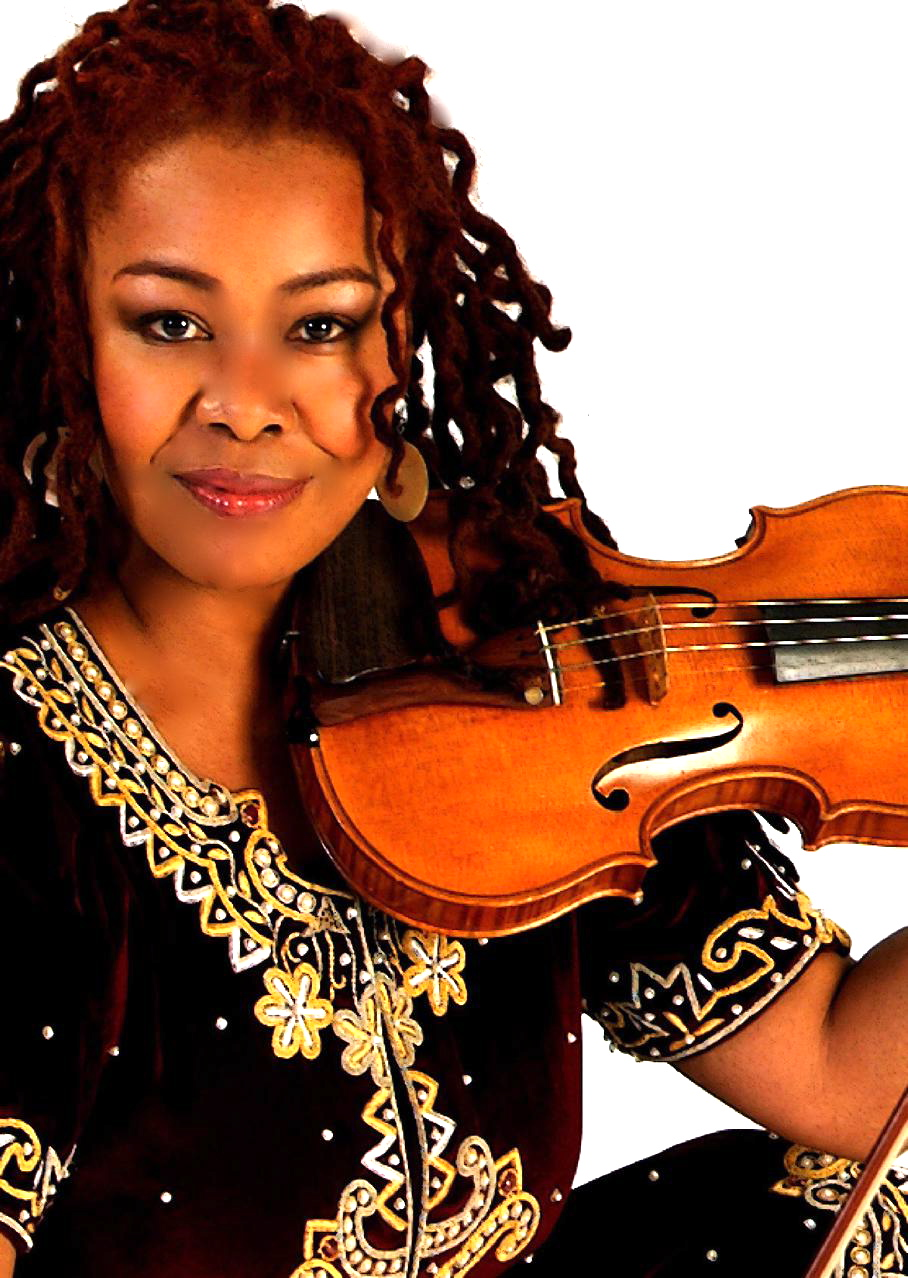

Background information
- Also known as: Lady in Red
- Born: August 12, 1963 (age 63); Manhattan, New York City, United States
- Genres: Jazz, contemporary instrumental
- Instrument: Violin
- Years active: 1983–present
- Label: Independent
- Website: www.karenbriggsviolin.com

Karen Briggs (born August 12, 1963), also known as the "Lady in Red", is an American violinist. Born in Manhattan to a family of musicians, Briggs started playing the violin at age 12 and committed to playing professionally at age 15. Briggs joined the Virginia Symphony Orchestra while still in college, but grew discontented with performing classical music and left the orchestra after four years. Since then, she has performed predominantly in the jazz and contemporary instrumental genres.

Best known for spending thirteen years on tour with contemporary instrumental musician Yanni, Briggs received the "Lady in Red" moniker while featuring as a soloist on Yanni's Live at the Acropolis tour. After parting with Yanni in 2004, she toured with other groups, including the short-lived jazz fusion group Vertú. Briggs has performed at such locations as Carnegie Hall and the John F. Kennedy Center for the Performing Arts, and has performed or collaborated with Dave Grusin, Diana Ross, the Wu Tang Clan, En Vogue, and Chaka Khan.

== Early life ==
Briggs was born in Manhattan, New York City, on August 12, 1963, to Frank Briggs, Jr. and Ruthie Powell. Her father played saxophone and sang in a Doo-wop group, her grandfather played trumpet and piano, and many other members of her family were either musicians or singers. The family lived in Manhattan's Harlem neighborhood and Englewood, New Jersey before moving to Portsmouth, Virginia, where Karen grew up. Briggs began taking violin lessons at twelve years old, having developed a talent for playing violin pieces by ear.

Briggs was the head of her class orchestra as a teenager and performed at a competition at Woodrow Wilson High School. She also played alongside her father and his colleagues, who were part of the local jazz scene in Hampton Roads, Virginia. With their encouragement, she decided at age 15 to become a professional jazz violinist. After graduating high school in 1981, she went to Norfolk State College where she majored in music education and mass media studies. She was the first member of her immediate family to attend college.

== Music career ==
In 1983, while studying at Norfolk State College, Briggs began performing at the Virginia Symphony Orchestra. Briggs found classical music restricting, and after four years at the Virginia Symphony Orchestra, Briggs left for New York in 1987 to play jazz instead. During her brief stay in New York, she won several amateur night competitions at the Apollo Theater. In 1988 Briggs married and moved to Los Angeles, California, where she became a frequent performer at the jazz club Marla's Memory Lane. Briggs' first professional tour was with the 100-piece ensemble group Soul II Soul; she was on tour with them in the United States and Japan in 1989.

In 1991, Briggs auditioned for contemporary instrumental musician Yanni. She secured a role in his tour by playing over a performance of his piece Within Attraction. Linda Evans, who was in a relationship with Yanni at that time, pushed for Briggs to be a featured soloist in Yanni's Live at the Acropolis tour. Briggs' performances during the tour gained her broad recognition and the moniker "Lady in Red". This acclaim lead to Briggs playing at Carnegie Hall alongside pianist and composer Dave Grusin, an appearance with Diana Ross on The Oprah Winfrey Show, and an appearance on The Tonight Show with Jay Leno. Her performance with Grusin at Carnegie Hall was incorporated as a cameo in the movie Music of the Heart. Briggs performed with Yanni for thirteen years, including the Live at the Acropolis, Tribute, and Ethnicity tours. In a 2004 interview with The HistoryMakers, Briggs reminisced that she might have been more commercially successful if she had parted with Yanni after Live at the Acropolis to pursue her solo career.

Following her time with Yanni, Briggs joined artists Stanley Clarke, Lenny White, Richie Kotzen, and Rachel Z to form the jazz fusion group Vertú. The group was short-lived, releasing one album in 1999. She has performed at the annual Mary Lou Williams Women in Jazz Festival at the John F. Kennedy Center for the Performing Arts in 2001, 2004, and 2007, and performed at the Kennedy Center's KC Jazz Club in 2010. Her performance in the KC Jazz Club was in support of the album Soulchestral Groove, which Briggs released independently in 2009. It is Briggs' third album, after releases of the self-titled,Karen in 1992 and Amazing Grace in 1996. Briggs has since joined the Lao Tizer Jazz Quartet, and also performs with the all-women group Jazz in Pink. Other artists that Briggs has collaborated with include the Wu Tang Clan, En Vogue, Diana Ross, Ledisi, Loose Ends, Orquestra Aragon, Kirk Franklin, Naseer Shamma, and Chaka Khan.

== Discography ==
Solo

- Karen (1992)
- Amazing Grace (1996)
- Soulchestral Groove (2009)

With Vertú

- Vertú (1999)
