= Stradivari (disambiguation) =

Antonio Stradivari (1644–1737) was an Italian luthier and craftsman of string instruments

Stradivari may also refer to:

- Omobono Stradivari (1679–1742), violin maker, son of Antonio
- Stradivari (1935 film), a German drama
- Stradivari (1988 film), a French-Italian biographical drama
- 19189 Stradivari, minor planet

== See also ==
- Stradivarius (disambiguation)
  - Stradivarius, a string instrument built by members of the Italian family Stradivari
  - List of Stradivarius instruments
- Stradivari Society, a philanthropic organization based in Chicago, Illinois
