= High Gear =

High Gear may refer to:

- High Gear (Howe II album), a 1989 album by Howe II
- High Gear (Whitecross album), a 1992 album by Whitecross
- High Gear (1933 film), an American film directed by Leigh Jason
- High Gear (1924 film), silent film starring Bobby Vernon and written by Keene Thompson
- A gear over 100 gear inches, see bicycle gearing
- A forward gear with a gear ratio yielding the greatest vehicle velocity for a given engine speed, see manual transmission
