= Change (Richie Kotzen album) =

Album by Richie Kotzen

Studio album by Richie Kotzen
- Released: October 7, 2003
- Recorded: At "The House"
- Genre: Post-grunge; hard rock; pop rock; jazz fusion
- Length: 44:26
- Label: Shrapnel
- Producer: Richie Kotzen

Richie Kotzen chronology
Slow (2001)	Change (2003)	Acoustic Cuts (2003)

Change is the seventh solo album by guitarist/vocalist Richie Kotzen. Both "Change" and "Get A Life" appeared in Japanese commercials following their release. Kotzen wrote and produced this album.

== Track listing ==
No.	Title	Length
1.	"Forever One"	3:47
2.	"Get a Life"	3:20
3.	"Change"	3:24
4.	"Don't Ask"	3:32
5.	"Deeper (Into You)"	4:15
6.	"High"	5:05
7.	"Am I Dreamin'"	3:45
8.	"Shine (Acoustic Version)" (Originally performed by Mr. Big)	3:52
9.	"Good for Me"	3:54
10.	"Fast Money Fast Cars"	6:59
11.	"Unity (Jazz Bee Bop Instrumental)"	2:43
12.	"Out Take" (Bonus track in Japanese version)	5:09

== Personnel ==
- Richie Kotzen – all instruments, composer, producer
- Pat Torpey – drums (on "High", "Out Take")
- Billy Sheehan – bass (on "Out Take")
- Charlie Sarti – additional vocals (on "Fast Money Fast Cars")
- Tom Baker – mastering
- Yngwie Malmsteen - composer
- Richie Zito - composer
- Takaomi Shibayama - artwork, design
- William Hames - photography
