= Black Light/White Noise =

Studio album by Smith/Kotzen
- Released: 4 April 2025
- Recorded: 2024
- Studios: The House, Los Angeles
- Genres: Hard rock; blues rock
- Length: 49:15
- Label: BMG
- Producers: Richie Kotzen and Adrian Smith

Smith/Kotzen chronology
| Smith/Kotzen (2021) | Black Light/White Noise (2025) |

Professional ratings
Review scores
| Source | Rating |
|---|---|
| Blabbermouth | 7/10 |
| KNAC.com | 4.5/5 |
| Sonic Perspectives | 8.0/10 |
| Teraz Rock | 4/5 stars |

Black Light/White Noise is the second studio album from rock musicians duo Adrian Smith and Richie Kotzen, released on 4 April 2025. The first promotional single "White Noise" was released on 20 November 2024, followed by the second one titled "Black Light" published on 20 February 2025. The third single entitled "Outlaw" was released on 9 April 2025.

== Track listing ==
All tracks are written by Adrian Smith and Richie Kotzen.

Black Light/White Noise track listing
| No. | Title | Length |
|---|---|---|
| 1. | "Muddy Water" | 3:32 |
| 2. | "White Noise" | 4:48 |
| 3. | "Black Light" | 4:32 |
| 4. | "Darkside" | 5:19 |
| 5. | "Life Unchained" | 5:14 |
| 6. | "Blindsided" | 4:23 |
| 7. | "Wraith" | 4:12 |
| 8. | "Heavy Weather" | 4:24 |
| 9. | "Outlaw" | 5:10 |
| 10. | "Beyond the Pale" | 7:23 |
| Total length: | | 49:15 |

== Personnel ==
Musicians

- Adrian Smith – vocals, guitar, recording, producer
- Richie Kotzen – vocals, guitar, bass guitar (tracks 1, 3, 5, 8, 10), drums (tracks 1, 2, 3, 6, 8, 9, 10), engineer, recording, producer
- Julia Lage – bass guitar (tracks 2, 4, 6, 7, 9)
- Bruno Valverde – drums (tracks 4, 7)
- Kyle Hughes – drums (track 5)

Additional personnel

- David Donnelly – mastering
- Jay Ruston – mixing
- John McMurtrie – art direction and photography
- Stuart Crouch Creative – artwork

== Charts ==
Chart performance for Black Light/White Noise
| Chart (2025) | Peak position |
|---|---|
| Austrian Albums (Ö3 Austria) | 19 |
| Belgian Albums (Ultratop Flanders) | 181 |
| Belgian Albums (Ultratop Wallonia) | 87 |
| Finnish Physical Albums (Suomen virallinen lista) | 6 |
| French Albums (SNEP) | 169 |
| German Albums Chart | 7 |
| Japanese Albums (Oricon) | 49 |
| Japanese International Albums | 7 |
| Scottish Albums (Official Charts) | 5 |
| Spanish Vinyl Albums | 17 |
| Swiss Albums (Schweizer Hitparade) | 14 |
| UK Albums (Official Charts) | 73 |
| UK Independent Albums (Official Charts) | 3 |
| UK Rock & Metal Albums (Official Charts) | 1 |
| US Top Album Sales (Billboard) | 15 |
| US Top Hard Rock Albums (Billboard) | 1 |
| US Top Rock Albums (Billboard) | 6 |
| US Heatseekers Albums (Billboard) | 5 |
| US Indie Store Album Sales (Billboard) | 7 |
