= Project (album) =

Studio album by Greg Howe and Richie Kotzen
- Released: November 11, 1997
- Recorded: home studio (Easton, Pennsylvania); Trist A' Whirl
- Genre: Instrumental rock, jazz fusion
- Length: 52:31
- Label: Shrapnel
- Producer: Greg Howe, Dexter Smittle, Lole Diro

Greg Howe chronology
Five (1996)	Project (1997)	Ascend (1999)

Richie Kotzen chronology
Wave of Emotion (1996)	Project (1997)	Something to Say (1997)

Project is the second collaborative studio album by guitarists Greg Howe and Richie Kotzen, released on November 11, 1997, through Shrapnel Records. A previous collaboration between Howe and Kotzen, Tilt (1995), had sold well and thus resulted in a second album.

== Track listing ==
No.	Title	Music	Length
1.	"One Function"	Greg Howe	5:12
2.	"Retro Slow"	Richie Kotzen	5:28
3.	"Present-Moment"	Howe	4:42
4.	"Trench"	Kotzen	5:38
5.	"Groove Epidemic"	Howe	4:30
6.	"Space"	Kotzen	6:40
7.	"Led Boots" (Jeff Beck cover)	Max Middleton	4:36
8.	"Crush"	Kotzen	5:48
9.	"Accessed"	Howe	3:31
10.	"Noise"	Kotzen	6:26
Total length:			52:31

== Personnel ==
- Greg Howe – guitar (left stereo channel), drum programming (tracks 1, 3, 5, 7, 9), bass (tracks 1, 3, 9), engineering (tracks 1, 3, 5, 7, 9), mixing (tracks 1, 3, 5, 7, 9), production (except tracks 2, 4, 6, 8, 10)
- Richie Kotzen – guitar (right stereo channel), keyboard, bass (tracks 2, 4, 6, 8, 10)
- Atma Anur – drums (tracks 2, 4, 6, 8, 10)
- Kevin Vecchione – bass (tracks 5, 7)
- Dexter Smittle – mixing (tracks 2, 4, 6, 8, 10), production (tracks 2, 4, 6, 8, 10)
- Lole Diro – mixing (tracks 2, 4, 6, 8, 10), production (tracks 2, 4, 6, 8, 10)
