= Tilt (Greg Howe and Richie Kotzen album) =

Studio album by Greg Howe and Richie Kotzen
- Released: 1995
- Recorded: Greg Howe's home studio in Easton, Pennsylvania; Richie Kotzen's home studio
- Genre: Instrumental rock, jazz fusion
- Length: 49:12
- Label: Shrapnel
- Producer: Greg Howe, Richie Kotzen

Greg Howe chronology
Parallax (1995)	Tilt (1995)	Five (1996)

Richie Kotzen chronology
The Inner Galactic Fusion Experience (1995)	Tilt (1995)	Wave of Emotion (1996)

Tilt is a collaborative studio album by guitarists Greg Howe and Richie Kotzen, released in 1995 through Shrapnel Records. The collaboration was organized by Shrapnel founder Mike Varney due to his enthusiasm for both guitarists' stylistic similarities, and as a result of good sales a second album, Project, was released in 1997.

== Critical reception ==
Professional ratings
Review scores
Source	Rating
AllMusic	2/5 stars

Stephen Thomas Erlewine at AllMusic gave Tilt two stars out of five, describing it as being "filled with fretboard heroics in the vein of Eddie Van Halen and Allan Holdsworth", but that it was "nearly half-a-decade behind the times". He criticized the album for lacking any memorable songs and being composed of "nothing but hot-shot guitar playing", while also being critical of the interplay between Howe and Kotzen: "The two guitarists sound like they're fighting each other, not playing."

== Track listing ==
No.	Title	Music	Length
1.	"Tilt"	Greg Howe	5:27
2.	"Chase the Dragon"	Richie Kotzen	4:59
3.	"Tarnished with Age"	Howe	5:10
4.	"Outfit"	Kotzen	4:14
5.	"Contusion"	Stevie Wonder	6:25
6.	"I Wanna Play"	Kotzen	5:42
7.	"Seventh Place"	Howe	6:26
8.	"O.D."	Kotzen	4:52
9.	"Full View"	Howe	5:57
Total length:			49:12

== Personnel ==
- Greg Howe – guitar (left stereo channel), keyboard, bass (tracks 1, 3, 5, 7, 9), engineering, mixing, production
- Richie Kotzen – guitar (right stereo channel), vocals, clavinet, bass (tracks 2, 4, 6, 8), engineering, mixing, production
- Jon Doman – drums (tracks 1, 3, 5, 9)
- Atma Anur – drums (tracks 2, 4, 6, 8)
- Kevin Soffera – drums (track 7)
- Kenneth K. Lee Jr. – mastering
