= Now Hear This (Howe II album) =

Studio album by Howe II
- Released: 1991
- Recorded: Prairie Sun Recording Studios in Cotati, California; Brilliant Recording Studios in San Francisco
- Genre: Hard rock
- Length: 39:22
- Label: Shrapnel
- Producer: Greg Howe, Steve Fontano, Mike Varney

Howe II chronology
High Gear (1989)	Now Hear This (1991)

Now Hear This is the second and final studio album by hard rock band Howe II, released in 1991 through Shrapnel Records. Following the album's release, guitarist Greg Howe would re-focus on his solo career, beginning with his 1993 album Introspection.

== Critical reception ==
Professional ratings
Review scores
Source	Rating
AllMusic	2.5/5 stars

Andy Hinds at AllMusic gave Now Hear This 2.5 stars out of 5, calling it "a more slickly produced offering than the early Van Halen inspired High Gear album", but otherwise "a disappointment; it sounds like a band that desperately wants mainstream success, even at the expense of its core values." He criticized the album for being "a blatant bid for stardom" and some of the songs as sounding "a bit muted this time around." Nonetheless he praised Greg's guitar playing, and listed "Crowd Pleaser" and "Motherlode" as highlights.

== Track listing ==
All tracks are written by Greg Howe and Albert Howe.

No.	Title	Length
1.	"Fat Cat"	4:18
2.	"The Ride"	3:48
3.	"Now Hear This"	4:46
4.	"Motherlode"	3:56
5.	"Bigger the Bite"	3:34
6.	"Crowd Pleaser"	4:08
7.	"A Delicacy"	2:05
8.	"Tip of My Tongue"	3:59
9.	"Heart of a Woman"	5:12
10.	"A Few Good Men"	3:36
Total length:		39:22

== Personnel ==
- Albert Howe – lead vocals
- Greg Howe – guitar, background vocals, production
- Mike Mani – keyboard
- Kevin Soffera – drums, background vocals
- Vern Parsons – bass, background vocals
- Steve Fontano – engineering, production
- Shawn Michael Morris – engineering
- Paul Stubblebine – mastering
- Mike Varney – production
