= The Inner Galactic Fusion Experience =

Studio album by Richie Kotzen
- Released: November 7, 1995
- Recorded: Richie Kotzen's home studio
- Genres: Instrumental rock, jazz fusion
- Length: 51:28
- Label: Shrapnel
- Producer: Richie Kotzen

Richie Kotzen chronology
Mother Head's Family Reunion (1994)	The Inner Galactic Fusion Experience (1995)	Tilt (1995)

The Inner Galactic Fusion Experience is the fifth studio album by guitarist Richie Kotzen, released on November 7, 1995, through Shrapnel Records.

== Track listing ==
All tracks are written by Richie Kotzen.

No.	Title	Length
1.	"Pulse"	6:20
2.	"Dose"	5:58
3.	"Hypnotist"	6:10
4.	"Ultramatic"	6:18
5.	"Trick"	5:10
6.	"Stark"	4:22
7.	"Hype"	5:42
8.	"Tramp"	7:06
9.	"Last Words"	4:22
Total length:		51:28

== Personnel ==
- Richie Kotzen – vocals, guitar, Wurlitzer, organ, drums (track 8), bass, sound effects, engineering, mixing, production
- Gregg Bissonette – drums (except track 8)
- Jeff Berlin – bass (tracks 1, 2, 4)
- DeAnna Eve – background vocals
- Jason Arnold – mastering
