= Stradivarius (disambiguation) =

A Stradivarius is a violin made by the Stradivari family.

Stradivarius may also refer to:

- Stradivarius (fashion retailer), a Spanish clothing retailer
- Stradivarius (horse) (born 2014), British-trained racehorse
- Stradivarius (record label), an Italian record label
- Stradivarius (film), 1935 German film
- Stradivarius (The Walking Dead), an episode of the television series The Walking Dead
- Stradivarius trumpet, a brand of trumpet of the Vincent Bach Corporation

== See also ==
- , includes many instruments known as the "X... Stradivarius"
- Antonio Stradivari, the most famous violin maker of the family
- List of Stradivarius instruments
- Stratavarious, an album by Ginger Baker
- "Strat-O-Various", a 1989 song by Howe II from High Gear
- Stratovarius, a Finnish power metal band
