= Electric Joy =

Studio album by Richie Kotzen
- Released: 1991
- Recorded: Richie Kotzen's home studio; Prairie Sun Recording Studios in Cotati, California
- Genre: Instrumental Rock
- Length: 42:05
- Label: Shrapnel
- Producer: Richie Kotzen

Richie Kotzen chronology
| Fever Dream (1990) | Electric Joy (1991) | Mother Head's Family Reunion (1994) |

Professional ratings
Review scores
| Source | Rating |
|---|---|
| AllMusic | 2.5/5 stars |

Electric Joy is the third studio album by guitarist Richie Kotzen, released in 1991 through Shrapnel Records.

== Track listing ==
All tracks are written by Richie Kotzen.

| No. | Title | Length |
|---|---|---|
| 1. | "B Funk" | 4:18 |
| 2. | "Electric Toy" | 5:01 |
| 3. | "Shufina" | 5:02 |
| 4. | "Acid Lips" | 4:45 |
| 5. | "Slow Blues" | 4:21 |
| 6. | "High Wire" | 5:41 |
| 7. | "Dr. Glee" | 4:11 |
| 8. | "Hot Rails" | 3:34 |
| 9. | "The Deece Song" | 5:12 |
| Total length: | | 42:05 |

== Personnel ==
- Richie Kotzen – guitar, bass, tubular bell, arrangement, engineering, mixing, production
- Atma Anur – drums, percussion
- Mark Rennick – engineering, mixing
- Shawn Morris – engineering
- Tom Coyne – mastering
