= Lost My Mind =

Lost My Mind may refer to:

- "Lost My Mind", a song by Lily Allen from No Shame
- "Lost My Mind", a song and extended play by Riton
- "Lost My Mind", a song by Matthew Sweet from 100% Fun
- "Lost My Mind", a song by Dillon Francis and Alison Wonderland
- "Lost My Mind", a song by They Might Be Giants from Nanobots

== See also ==
- "I Almost Lost My Mind", a 1950 song by Ivory Joe Hunter
- Lost in My Mind (disambiguation)
- Lose My Mind (disambiguation)
