= Hyperacuity (album) =

Studio album by Greg Howe
- Released: June 6, 2000
- Recorded: Late 1999
- Studio: Greg Howe's home studio, Easton, Pennsylvania
- Genre: Instrumental rock, jazz fusion
- Length: 45:07
- Label: Tone Center
- Producer: Greg Howe

Greg Howe chronology
Ascend (1999)	Hyperacuity (2000)	Extraction (2003)

Hyperacuity is the seventh studio album by the American guitarist Greg Howe, released on June 6, 2000, through Tone Center Records.

== Critical reception ==
Professional ratings
Review scores
Source	Rating
All About Jazz	Favorable
AllMusic	4/5 stars

The staff at All About Jazz gave Hyperacuity a positive review, calling it "Howe's best release to date" and praising his guitar playing as having evolved from his previous shred-oriented releases. Paula Edelstein at AllMusic described the album as an "instrumental extravaganza comprised of fusion compositions that highlight Howe's incredible techniques and melodic flair." She listed "Blindfold Drive", "Order of Dawn", "Heat Activated", Howe's cover of Stevie Wonder's "I Wish", and the title track as highlights.

== Track listing ==
All music is composed by Greg Howe, except where noted.

No.	Title	Length
1.	"Hyperacuity"	5:54
2.	"Blindfold Drive"	6:13
3.	"Order of Dawn"	8:33
4.	"Heat Activated"	5:03
5.	"Receptionist"	6:28
6.	"Trinka"	6:12
7.	"I Wish" (Stevie Wonder)	6:44
Total length:		45:07

== Personnel ==
- Greg Howe – guitar, keyboard, engineering, producer
- Prashant Aswani – guitar (track 3; right stereo channel)
- Kevin Soffera – drums, udu
- Dale Fischer – bass
