= Live in São Paulo (Richie Kotzen album) =

Live album by Richie Kotzen
- Released: May 5, 2008
- Recorded: September 30, 2007
- Genre: Hard rock, Jazz fusion, Soul, Blues
- Length: 76:58
- Label: Headroom – Inc., Yoshimoto R and C CO.
- Producer: Richie Kotzen

Richie Kotzen chronology
Go Faster (2007)	Live in São Paulo (2008)	Peace Sign (2009)

Alternative cover
- Bootlegged In Brazil

Live in São Paulo is a live album by guitarist/vocalist Richie Kotzen. This is the first official live album by Kotzen and was recorded live in São Paulo, Brazil.

== Track listing ==
No.	Title	Length
1.	"Socialite"	7:28
2.	"High"	6:19
3.	"Remember"	6:48
4.	"Fooled Again"	7:56
5.	"Faith"	7:31
6.	"So Cold"	7:32
7.	"A Love Divine"	5:45
8.	"Shapes Of Things" (Originally performed by The Yardbirds)	5:17
9.	"Doin' What The Devil Says To Do"	9:15
10.	"I'm Losing You" (Originally performed by The Temptations)	5:48
11.	"Mother Head's Family Reunion"	3:13
12.	"Stand" (Originally performed by Poison)	6:06

=== Bootlegged In Brazil ===
The Japanese edition was released with different cover, songs in distinct order and the tracks "Losin' My Mind", "Go Faster" and "Don't Ask" instead of "Remember", "Fooled Again" and "Faith".

== Track listing ==
No.	Title	Length
1.	"Losin' My Mind"	3:15
2.	"Go Faster"	2:51
3.	"A Love Divine"	5:50
4.	"Socialite"	7:33
5.	"So Cold"	7:25
6.	"Don't Ask"	3:44
7.	"High"	6:20
8.	"Shapes Of Things"	5:15
9.	"Doin' What The Devil Says To Do"	9:59
10.	"I'm Losing You"	7:31
11.	"Mother Head's Family Reunion"	3:12
12.	"Stand"	6:22

- This version also features a bonus DVD including the live performances of "Losin' My Mind", "Fooled Again", "So Cold", "Remember" and "Doin' What The Devil Says To Do".

== Personnel ==
- Richie Kotzen – lead vocals, guitar
- Johnny Griparic – bass guitar
- Dan Potruch – drums
