= Salting Earth =

Studio album by Richie Kotzen
- Released: 2017
- Recorded: At 'The house'
- Genre: Hard rock; soft rock; soul; blues rock
- Label: Headroom – Inc.
- Producer: Richie Kotzen

Richie Kotzen chronology
Cannibals (2015)	Salting Earth (2017)

Salting Earth is the twentieth studio album by guitarist/vocalist Richie Kotzen published in 2017 by Headroom Inc.

== Track listing ==
All tracks are written by Richie Kotzen.

No.	Title	Length
1.	"End Of Earth"	6:19
2.	"Thunder"	3:55
3.	"Divine Power"	4:17
4.	"I've Got You"	3:31
5.	"My Rock"	3:59
6.	"This Is Life"	5:05
7.	"Make It Easy"	3:24
8.	"Meds"	3:21
9.	"Cannon Ball"	3:14
10.	"Grammy"	2:50
Total length:		39:20

== Personnel ==
- Richie Kotzen – all instruments
- Julia Lage - additional vocals on 'Make It Easy'
