= Something to Say (Richie Kotzen album) =

Studio album by Richie Kotzen
- Released: 1997
- Recorded: Trist A' Whirl
- Genre: Hard rock, Soft rock, Soul, Blues, R&B
- Length: 41:49
- Label: Spitfire Records
- Producer: Richie Kotzen

Richie Kotzen chronology
Project (1996)	Something to Say (1997)	What Is... (1998)

Something to Say is the seventh album by guitarist/vocalist Richie Kotzen.

== Track listing ==
No.	Title	Length
1.	"Something To Say"	4:12
2.	"What Makes a Man"	4:05
3.	"The Bitter End"	3:35
4.	"Faded"	5:15
5.	"Let Me In"	4:56
6.	"Rust"	3:48
7.	"Ready"	3:51
8.	"Aberdine"	3:59
9.	"Holy Man"	3:05
10.	"Camouflage"	2:29
11.	"Turned Out"	2:41

- The Japanese version has the songs in distinct order and includes the bonus track "Paradox" (2:42).

== Personnel ==
- Richie Kotzen – all vocals, guitars, bass, wurlitzer piano, drums (on "Turned Out", "Ready", "Holy Man")
- Kim Bullard – Hammond B3 organ (on "Bitter End", "Let Me In", "Aberdine), mellotron (on "Aberdine")
- Arlan Schierbaum – Hammond B3 organ (on "What Makes A Man", "Ready", "Turned Out" and "Holy Man")
- Atma Anur – drums, percussion
- Lole Diro and Dexter Smittle – recorder, mixing
- Wally Traugott – mastering at Capitol
