= Peace Sign (Richie Kotzen album) =

2009 studio album released by Richie Kotzen

Studio album by Richie Kotzen
- Released: 2009
- Recorded: At 'The house'
- Genre: Hard rock, R&B, Soul, Blues
- Length: 49:40
- Label: Headroom – Inc.
- Producer: Richie Kotzen

Richie Kotzen chronology
Live in São Paulo (2008)	Peace Sign (2009)	24 Hours (2011)

Peace Sign
Review scores
Source	Rating
HardRockHaven.net	7/10 stars
Musik Reviews	12/15 stars
RockUnited.com	7/10 stars

Peace Sign is the seventeenth studio album by guitarist/vocalist Richie Kotzen. It was released in Japan on September 9, 2009 and October 19, 2009 elsewhere.

== Track listing ==
All tracks are written by Richie Kotzen.

No.	Title	Length
1.	"My Messiah"	2:59
2.	"Long Way from Home"	3:57
3.	"Paying Dues"	4:52
4.	"Peace Sign"	5:22
5.	"Best of Times"	4:50
6.	"We're All Famous"	3:58
7.	"You Got Me"	3:11
8.	"Your Entertainer"	3:52
9.	"Catch Up to Me"	3:42
10.	"Lie to Me"	4:07
11.	"Larger Than Life"	4:37
12.	"Holding On"	4:09
Total length:		49:40

Japanese version
No.	Title	Length
1.	"My Messiah"	2:59
2.	"Paying Dues"	4:51
3.	"Best of Times"	4:48
4.	"Lie to Me"	4:07
5.	"Peace Sign"	5:23
6.	"We're All Famous"	3:58
7.	"You Got Me"	3:12
8.	"Long Way from Home"	3:56
9.	"Catch Up to Me"	3:42
10.	"Your Entertainer"	3:50
11.	"Larger Than Life"	4:36
12.	"Holding On"	4:10
13.	"I Want You Back" (The Jackson 5 cover)	2:53
Total length:		52:33

== Personnel ==
- Richie Kotzen – all instruments
- Dan Potruch – drums (on "Long Way from Home", "Best of Times", "Paying Dues" and "Peace Sign")
- Dave Donnelly – mastering
