= Parallax (Greg Howe album) =

Studio album by Greg Howe
- Released: November 7, 1995
- Studio: Greg Howe's home studio, Easton, Pennsylvania
- Genre: Instrumental rock, jazz fusion
- Length: 46:51
- Label: Shrapnel
- Producer: Greg Howe

Greg Howe chronology
Uncertain Terms (1994)	Parallax (1995)	Tilt (1995)

Parallax is the fourth studio album by guitarist Greg Howe, released on November 7, 1995 through Shrapnel Records.

== Critical reception ==
Professional ratings
Review scores
Source	Rating
AllMusic	2.5/5 stars

Andy Hinds at AllMusic awarded Parallax 2.5 stars out of 5, describing it as following the same outline as Howe's two previous albums, Introspection (1993) and Uncertain Terms (1994). He said it "doesn't offer any surprises, but delivers mind-blowing guitar performances by the truckload" and that "guitar geeks will revel in the over-the-top decadence of this highly indulgent instrumental shred-fest." As with Introspection, he criticized the album's production as "rather clinical-sounding (especially those triggered drums)", but praised the evolution of Howe's guitar tone: "His guitar tone has evolved from a brash, metallic sound (heard in his earlier work) to a smooth, compressed signal, which suits his extended legato forays quite well."

== Track listing ==
All music is composed by Greg Howe.

No.	Title	Length
1.	"Howe 'Bout It"	5:31
2.	"Found Unwound"	5:39
3.	"Dance"	5:00
4.	"Time Off"	7:11
5.	"Joker's Wild"	6:00
6.	"The Portrait"	3:19
7.	"Bottom Line"	4:59
8.	"On Sail"	5:13
9.	"Roundhouse"	3:59
Total length:		46:51

== Personnel ==
- Greg Howe – guitar, keyboard, engineering, mixing, production
- Jon Doman – drums (except track 7)
- Kevin Soffera – drums (track 7)
- Andy Ramirez – bass
- Kenneth K. Lee Jr. – mastering
