= Slow (Richie Kotzen album) =

Studio album by Richie Kotzen
- Released: 2001
- Recorded: At "The House"
- Genre: Hard rock, R&B, Soul, Jazz fusion, Blues
- Length: 42:21
- Label: Shrapnel Records
- Producer: Richie Kotzen

Richie Kotzen chronology
| Bi-Polar Blues (1999) | Slow (2001) | Change (2003) |

Slow is the eleventh album by guitarist/vocalist Richie Kotzen.

== Track listing ==
| No. | Title | Length |
|---|---|---|
| 1. | "Ohio" | 0:40 |
| 2. | "Scared of You" | 4:17 |
| 3. | "Gold Digger" | 4:44 |
| 4. | "The Answer" | 1:19 |
| 5. | "Slow" | 4:05 |
| 6. | "Don't Wanna Lie" | 4:10 |
| 7. | "Got It Bad" | 3:38 |
| 8. | "I Can Make You Happy" | 4:51 |
| 9. | "Sapphire" | 0:54 |
| 10. | "Come Back (Swear To God)" | 3:56 |
| 11. | "Rely on Me" | 3:35 |
| 12. | "Let's Say Goodbye" | 4:32 |
| 13. | "Conflicted" | 2:11 |
| 14. | "Conflicted (Reprise)" (Bonus track in Japanese version) | 2:06 |

- In Russian version "All I Can" is listed as bonus track 14.

== Personnel ==
- Richie Kotzen – all instruments
- Richie Kotzen – recorder
- Tom Baker – mastering
- Bruce Martin - Photographs
- Taka Shibayama (Paper Land) - Art Layout
