= The Winery Dogs (album) =

Studio album by The Winery Dogs
- Released: May 5, 2013
- Recorded: August–December 2012 (Los Angeles, California)
- Genre: Hard rock
- Length: 60:14
- Label: Loud & Proud Records
- Producer: The Winery Dogs

The Winery Dogs chronology
The Winery Dogs (2013)	Hot Streak (2015)

The Winery Dogs is the debut album by the American rock band of the same name, released in Japan on May 5, 2013, and worldwide on July 23.

== Reception ==
Professional ratings
Review scores
Source	Rating
AllMusic	(positive)
Sputnikmusic	4/5 stars

=== Critical ===
The album received positive reviews from critics. AllMusic reviewer James Christopher Monger compared the album to blues rock bands such as Cream and Led Zeppelin and modern hard rock bands like Soundgarden, Black Stone Cherry and Velvet Revolver. He called the album "hard-hitting, fun, yet meticulously crafted 21st century rock that manages to celebrate the past and kick open new doors."

=== Commercial ===
Released on July 23, 2013, it sold 10,200 copies in the United States in its first week, and reached No. 27 on the Billboard 200 albums chart. It also debuted at No. 5 on Billboard's Top Rock Albums, No. 3 on Alternative Albums, and No. 4 on Independent Albums. The album has sold 58,000 copies in the United States as of September 2015.

== Track listing ==
All tracks written by The Winery Dogs.

No.	Title	Length
1.	"Elevate"	5:02
2.	"Desire"	3:41
3.	"We Are One"	4:32
4.	"I'm No Angel"	4:04
5.	"The Other Side"	5:41
6.	"You Saved Me"	5:13
7.	"Not Hopeless"	5:05
8.	"One More Time"	3:36
9.	"Damaged"	3:30
10.	"Six Feet Deeper"	4:13
11.	"Time Machine"	4:45
12.	"The Dying"	6:07
13.	"Regret"	4:50

On the Japanese edition of the album, the track "Criminal" replaced "Time Machine" on the track listing. The order in which the songs are listed remains the same.

== Personnel ==
- Richie Kotzen – lead vocals, guitars, keyboards
- Billy Sheehan – bass, vocals
- Mike Portnoy – drums, percussion, vocals
