= Lose My Mind =

Lose My Mind may refer to:

- "Lose My Mind" (Brett Eldredge song), 2015
- "Lose My Mind" (Dean Lewis song), 2017
- "Lose My Mind" (The Wanted song), 2010
- "Lose My Mind" (Young Jeezy song), 2010
- "Lose My Mind" (Don Toliver song), 2025
- "Lose My Mind", a song by James Arthur from It'll All Make Sense in the End, 2022

== See also ==
- Losing My Mind (disambiguation)
- Lost My Mind (disambiguation)
- Lost in My Mind (disambiguation)
