= Soundproof (group) =

- Origin: London, England
- Genres: Dubstep, drum and bass
- Years active: 2005–present
- Members: Jamie; Yung-e

Soundproof are English dubstep producers and DJs born and raised in West London. Jamie and Yung-e (Soundproof) would try their luck at the door and sometimes would make it in to the rave. Seeing the DJs inspired them to get turntables and start buying drum and bass vinyl. When the dark garage sounds started to emerge they were straight on to that. With producers like EL-B, Zed Bias and Landslide inspiring them to take the next step in to music production. Over 2 years they would pass new beats to DJs like Distance, Coki and Leofa. This led to them getting signed to one of the first ever Dubstep labels 'BOKA Records'. Their first ever release was '3 Degree's' which featured on 'The low end dubs ep' alongside Distance and SLT Mob. They were appearing on vinyl with some of the best in the newly formed Dubstep scene.

As well as releasing music Soundproof were DJing on some of the best pirate radio stations in London at the time. These include Flex FM, React FM, Image FM, Ice Cold FM and Y2K FM 90.6.

== Discography ==
- Beyond the Milkyway (Soundproof Records, 2005)
- Ruggard EP (Boka Records, 2006)

The city EP (soundproof recordings 2006) Bring the lights down – Soundproof recordings 2006

- 3Degrees (Remix) / Jungle Story (Soundproof Records, 2010)
- Darkstar (Infamous Recordingz, 2011)

The unrelated ep – Soundproof recordings 2011 Barbarian ep – Soundproof recordings 2012 Atmospheric Changes: Transmission 1 – Soundproof Recordings 2012
