= Greg Howe (album) =

Studio album by Greg Howe
- Released: 1988
- Studio: Prairie Sun Recording, Cotati, California
- Genre: Instrumental rock
- Length: 41:44
- Label: Shrapnel
- Producer: Mike Varney

Greg Howe chronology
Greg Howe (1988)	Introspection (1993)

Greg Howe is the first studio album by guitarist Greg Howe, released in 1988 by Shrapnel Records. Prior to its recording, Howe had sent a demo tape to Shrapnel founder Mike Varney in 1987, after which he was signed to the label.

== Critical reception ==
Professional ratings
Review scores
Source	Rating
AllMusic	4/5 stars
Collector's Guide to Heavy Metal	5/10

Andy Hinds at AllMusic described Greg Howe as "fresh compared to the melodramatic work of peers like, say, Vinnie Moore" and "a high-octane, indulgent rock romp. Worth hearing." He also listed "Kick It All Over" and "The Pepper Shake" as highlights. Martin Popoff in his Collector's Guide to Heavy Metal found the album "not all heavy, but for the most part, fruity, pop-tastic and colourful", while Howe's guitar playing reminded him of George Lynch.

In a 2009 article by Guitar World magazine, the album was ranked 10th on the all-time top 10 list of shred albums. As of 2006 it remains Howe's best-selling release.

== Track listing ==
All music is composed by Greg Howe.

Side one
No.	Title	Length
1.	"Kick It All Over"	5:03
2.	"The Pepper Shake"	4:11
3.	"Bad Racket"	3:43
4.	"Super Unleaded"	5:38
5.	"Land of Ladies"	4:25

Side two
No.	Title	Length
6.	"Straight Up"	3:58
7.	"Red Handed"	5:23
8.	"After Hours"	3:33
9.	"Little Rose"	5:50
Total length:		41:44

== Personnel ==
Musicians

- Greg Howe – guitar
- Billy Sheehan – bass
- Atma Anur – drums

Production

- Steve Fontano – engineer, mixing
- Mark "Mooka" Rennick – mixing
- Joe Marquez, Marc Reyburn – assistant engineers
- Steve Hall – mastering
- Mike Varney – producer
