= Get Up (Richie Kotzen album) =

Studio album by Richie Kotzen
- Released: 2004
- Recorded: Headroom – Inc.
- Genre: Hard rock; post-grunge; soul
- Length: 36:20
- Label: Headroom – Inc.
- Producer: Richie Kotzen

Richie Kotzen chronology
Acoustic Cuts (2003)	Get Up (2004)	Ai Senshi Z×R (2006)

Get Up is the thirteenth album by guitarist/vocalist Richie Kotzen. It was released on September 25, 2004.

== Track listing ==
No.	Title	Length
1.	"Losin' My Mind"	3:09
2.	"Fantasy"	2:41
3.	"Remember"	4:33
4.	"Get Up"	2:59
5.	"So Cold"	3:30
6.	"Such a Shame"	3:39
7.	"Made for Tonight"	3:43
8.	"Still"	3:34
9.	"Never Be the Same"	3:24
10.	"Special"	5:12
11.	"Shapes of Things" (Bonus track in Japanese version/Originally performed by The Yardbirds)	4:57

- In Korean version "Blame on Me" is listed as bonus track 11.
- In digipak version "Feel Good" is listed as bonus track 11.

== Personnel ==
- Richie Kotzen – all instruments
- Stevie Salas – bass (on "Shapes of Things")
- Brian Tichy – drums (on "Shapes of Things")
- Alex Todorov, Richie Kotzen – recorder, mixing
