= Nothing to Lose (Forty Deuce album) =

Studio album by Forty Deuce
- Released: 2005
- Recorded: Headroom – Inc.
- Genre: Post-grunge; hard rock
- Length: 41:25
- Label: Frontiers Records
- Producer: Richie Kotzen, Taka & Ari

Nothing to Lose is an album released under the name of "Forty Deuce" which is a band formed by guitarist/vocalist Richie Kotzen.

== Track listing ==
No.	Title	Length
1.	"Intro"	0:20
2.	"Oh My God"	3:29
3.	"I Still"	3:07
4.	"Start It Up"	3:12
5.	"Complicated"	3:06
6.	"Say"	3:30
7.	"Heaven"	3:49
8.	"Stand Up"	3:45
9.	"Next To Me"	3:51
10.	"Standing In The Rain"	3:55
11.	"Wanted"	3:59
12.	"Nothing To Lose"	4:08
13.	"Standing In The Rain (Japanese Version)" (Bonus track in Japanese edition)	3:54

== Personnel ==
- Richie Kotzen – vocals, guitar
- Taka Tamada – rhythm guitar
- Ari Baron – bass
- Thr3e – drums
- Alex Todorov – engineering, mixing
