= Lost in My Mind (disambiguation) =

"Lost in My Mind" is a 2018 song by Rüfüs Du Sol.

Lost in My Mind may also refer to:

- "Lost in My Mind", a song by the Head and the Heart from the 2011 album The Head and the Heart

== See also ==
- "Losin' My Mind", a song by En Vogue from the 2004 album Soul Flower
- Lose My Mind (disambiguation)
- Lost My Mind (disambiguation)
