= Losing My Mind (disambiguation) =

"Losing My Mind" is a song by Stephen Sondheim.

Losing My Mind may also refer to:

- "Losing My Mind" (Grey's Anatomy), an episode of Grey's Anatomy
- "Losing My Mind" (Desperate Housewives), an episode of Desperate Housewives
- "Losing My Mind" (Falling in Reverse song), 2018
- "Losing My Mind" (Maroon 5 song), a 2007 B-side to "Wake Up Call"
- "Losing My Mind", a song by Daughtry from Break the Spell
- "Losing My Mind", a song by Charlie Puth from Nine Track Mind
- "Losing My Mind", a song by The Cranberries from Roses

== See also ==
- Insanity
- Lose My Mind (disambiguation)
