= Vertú =

Jazz fusion band

Vertú is a jazz fusion band consisting of bassist Stanley Clarke and drummer Lenny White (both of Return to Forever fame), keyboardist Rachel Z, violinist Karen Briggs and guitarist Richie Kotzen. The band released one self-titled album in 1999.

== Discography ==
- Vertú (Sony, 1999)
