= Sound Proof (album) =

Studio album by Greg Howe
- Released: June 24, 2008
- Recorded: Prairie Sun Recording Studios in Cotati, California; Greg Howe's home studio in Long Beach, California
- Genre: Instrumental rock, jazz fusion
- Length: 56:21
- Label: Tone Center
- Producer: Greg Howe

Greg Howe chronology
Collection: The Shrapnel Years (2006)	Sound Proof (2008)	Wheelhouse (2017)

Sound Proof is the eighth studio album by guitarist Greg Howe, released on June 24, 2008, through Tone Center Records.

== Critical reception ==
Professional ratings
Review scores
Source	Rating
All About Jazz	Favorable
AllMusic	3.5/5 stars
JazzTimes	Neutral

Glenn Astarita at All About Jazz gave Sound Proof a positive review, calling it "Howe's finest musical statement to date" and praising the technical craft of each musician. He listed "Sunset in El Paso", "Child's Play" and Howe's cover of "Tell Me Something Good" by Stevie Wonder as highlights.

Greg Prato at AllMusic gave the album 3.5 stars out of 5, saying that "Musical trends may come and go, but you always know what's in store with a new Greg Howe release, and this veteran shredder certainly doesn't disappoint with Sound Proof." Praise was given to Howe's playing, which was described as sounding like Steve Vai on "Morning View", as well as other highlights "Emergency Exit" and "Side Note". Prato concluded by recommending Sound Proof to fans of "all-instrumental prog metal with guitar at the forefront".

== Track listing ==
All music is composed by Greg Howe, except where noted.

No.	Title	Length
1.	"Intro" (skit)	0:13
2.	"Emergency Exit"	7:31
3.	"Tell Me Something Good" (Stevie Wonder)	5:37
4.	"Connoisseur Part 1" (skit)	0:29
5.	"Reunion"	5:53
6.	"Morning View"	4:36
7.	"Walkie Talkie"	6:13
8.	"Rehearsal Note" (skit)	0:16
9.	"Side Note"	7:14
10.	"Sunset in El Paso"	4:15
11.	"Write Me a Song" (skit)	0:30
12.	"Child's Play"	4:23
13.	"Sound Proof"	6:42
14.	"Connoisseur Part 2" (skit)	2:29
Total length:		56:21

== Personnel ==
- Greg Howe – guitar, spoken vocals (track 11), production
- David Cook – keyboard
- Dennis Hamm – keyboard solo (track 9)
- Gianluca Palmieri – drums
- Jon Reshard – bass
- Elvio Fernandez – spoken vocals (track 1, 11)
- Dale Fischer – spoken vocals (tracks 4, 14)
- Greg Wiktorski – engineering
- Jason D'Ottavio – mixing
- Ashley Moore – mastering
