= Smith/Kotzen (album) =

Studio album by Smith/Kotzen
- Released: 26 March 2021
- Recorded: February 2020
- Studio: Windmere, Turks & Caicos
- Genre: Hard rock; blues rock
- Length: 47:18
- Label: BMG
- Producer: Richie Kotzen; Adrian Smith

Smith/Kotzen chronology
Smith/Kotzen (2021)	Black Light/White Noise (2025)

Smith/Kotzen is the self-titled debut album from rock musicians Adrian Smith and Richie Kotzen, released on 26 March 2021.

"Taking My Chances" was released as the first single from the album in December 2020. It was followed by "Scars" in February 2021, and "Running" in March.

== Commercial performance ==
Smith/Kotzen placed at number five on the midweek UK Albums Chart dated 29 March 2021, eventually debuting at number 17 on the final chart dated 2 April 2021.

== Track listing ==
All tracks are written by Adrian Smith and Richie Kotzen.

No.	Title	Length
1.	"Taking My Chances"	4:46
2.	"Running"	4:19
3.	"Scars"	6:18
4.	"Some People"	4:22
5.	"Glory Road"	4:54
6.	"Solar Fire"	4:29
7.	"You Don't Know Me"	7:14
8.	"I Wanna Stay"	5:13
9.	"'Til Tomorrow"	5:39
Total length:		47:18

== Personnel ==
Personnel taken from Smith/Kotzen liner notes.

Smith/Kotzen

- Adrian Smith - guitars, vocals, bass (7–9)
- Richie Kotzen - guitars, vocals, bass (1–6), drums (1–5)

Guest musicians

- Nicko McBrain - drums (6)
- Tal Bergman - drums (7–9)

Technical personnel

- Recorded and produced by Richie Kotzen and Adrian Smith
- Mixed by Kevin "Caveman" Shirley
- Mastered by Ryan Smith

== Charts ==
Professional ratings
Review scores
Source	Rating
Kerrang!	3/5 stars
Louder	4/5 stars
Metal Hammer	3.5/5 stars

Chart performance for Smith/Kotzen
Chart (2021)	Peak position
Austrian Albums (Ö3 Austria)	11
Belgian Albums (Ultratop Flanders)	101
Belgian Albums (Ultratop Wallonia)	50
Dutch Albums (Album Top 100)	89
Finnish Albums (Suomen virallinen lista)	41
French Albums (SNEP)	70
German Albums (Offizielle Top 100)	13
Italian Albums (FIMI)	35
Polish Albums (ZPAV)	41
Scottish Albums (OCC)	5
Spanish Albums (Promusicae)	18
Swedish Albums (Sverigetopplistan)	7
Swiss Albums (Schweizer Hitparade)	8
UK Albums (OCC)	17
US Top Album Sales (Billboard)	10
US Top Hard Rock Albums (Billboard)	9
US Top Rock Albums (Billboard)	15
US Heatseekers Albums (Billboard)	1
US Indie Store Album Sales (Billboard)	7
