= Bi-Polar Blues =

Studio album by Richie Kotzen
- Released: May 18, 1999
- Genre: Hard rock, Jazz fusion, Soul, Blues
- Length: 53:02
- Label: Blues Bureau International
- Producer: Richie Kotzen

Richie Kotzen chronology
Break It All Down (1999)	Bi-Polar Blues (1999)	Slow (2001)

Professional ratings
Review scores
Source	Rating
Allmusic	3/5 stars

Bi-Polar Blues is the tenth album by guitarist/vocalist Richie Kotzen.

== Track listing ==
All tracks composed by Richie Kotzen; except where indicated

No.	Title	Writer(s)	Length
1.	"Gone Tomorrow Blues"		4:32
2.	"Tied to You"		4:07
3.	"They're Red Hot"	Robert Johnson	3:46
4.	"Tobacco Road"	J.D. Loudermilk	4:33
5.	"Broken Man Blues"		4:18
6.	"The Thrill Is Gone"	Arthur Benson, Dale Pettite	5:45
7.	"From Four Till Late"	R.L. Johnson	4:56
8.	"Step Away"		5:44
9.	"Burn It Down"		4:34
10.	"No Kinda Hero"		5:23
11.	"Richie's Boogie"		5:09

== Personnel ==
- Richie Kotzen – lead vocals, guitar, wurlitzer piano, bass, drums
- Rob Harrington – bass (on "Tobacco Road" & "Thrill Is Gone")
- Matt Luneau – drums (on "Gone Tomorrow Blues", "They're Red Hot","Tobacco Road", "Thrill Is Gone" & "From Four Till Late")
