= Greg Howe =

American guitarist and composer (born 1963)

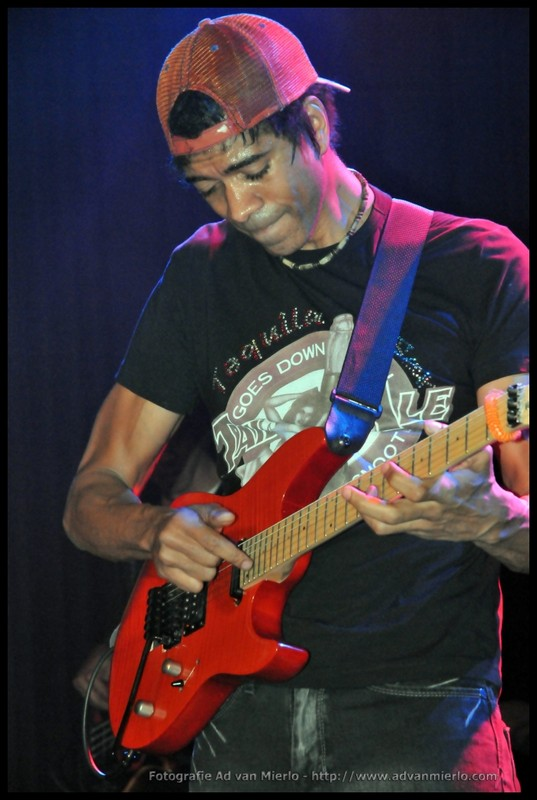
- Howe performing in Weert, 2011

Background information
- Born: Gregory Howe; December 8, 1963 (age 62); New York City, New York, U.S.
- Genres: Instrumental rock; jazz fusion; hard rock; neoclassical metal
- Occupations: Musician; composer; producer; guitar instructor
- Instrument: Guitar
- Years active: 1982–present
- Labels: Shrapnel; Tone Center
- Website: Official website

Gregory Howe (born December 8, 1963) is an American guitarist and composer. An active musician across four decades, he has released ten studio albums in addition to collaborating with a wide variety of artists.

== Recording career ==
=== Solo ===
After leaving high school and playing the club circuit around the New Jersey, New York and Pennsylvania areas with his brother Albert Howe (a singer) for most of the 1980s, Greg Howe officially began his solo career after sending a demo tape to Shrapnel Records in 1987, upon which he was immediately signed by founder Mike Varney. His self-titled debut album, Greg Howe, was released in 1988 during the popular shred era, and went on to become his highest-selling album; a 2009 article in Guitar World magazine ranked it tenth in the all-time top ten list of shred albums.

The following year, he joined with Albert to form a Van Halen-inspired hard rock group named Howe II. Through Shrapnel, they released two studio albums: High Gear (1989) and Now Hear This (1991). His second solo album, Introspection, was released in 1993. At this point his style had changed radically from the straightforward instrumental rock of both his debut and the Howe II albums, to a more jazz fusion-laden approach which remains unique and identifiable to this day; some of his signature traits being fast left-hand legato passages (having been influenced greatly by jazz fusion guitarist Allan Holdsworth), and the frequent use of tapping and odd time signatures. One particularly noteworthy aspect of Howe's legato technique is the "hammer-on from nowhere", in which a note is hammered-on to a different string without first being picked.

A trio of albums spanning the middle part of the decade – Uncertain Terms (1994), Parallax (1995) and Five (1996) – were all a consistent evolution of the sound he had adopted on Introspection. During this time he collaborated twice with guitarist Richie Kotzen for the albums Tilt and Project in 1995 and 1997, respectively. He then briefly dabbled with a heavier, neo-classical metal style for his 1999 release, Ascend, which featured keyboardist Vitalij Kuprij. Howe has since spoken of his dissatisfaction for that project, as well as an earlier collaboration on Kuprij's own album, High Definition (1997).

After switching labels to Shrapnel's jazz-oriented counterpart, Tone Center Records, he returned to his familiar style with Hyperacuity (2000), which still stands as some of his most prominent experimentation with jazz fusion. After a highly troubled recording process for Extraction (2003) – a collaboration with drummer Dennis Chambers and bassist Victor Wooten – he took an extended hiatus from recording solo material until the release of his eighth studio album, Sound Proof, in 2008. It would be another nine years until Howe's next solo release, Wheelhouse, in 2017, which has been described as his "most personal work to date" and marks his return to solo instrumental work. For one track of the album, "Shady Lane", Richie Kotzen provided vocals.

In a 2015 article by Guitar World, Howe was ranked tenth in the "Top 10 Pick Squealers of All Time". In December 2019, Guitar World ranked Howe's "Wheelhouse" album number six in "The 20 best guitar albums of the decade".

=== Maragold ===
In 2012 it was announced that Howe would play in a new band named Maragold, which would include drummer Gianluca Palmieri (who previously played on Sound Proof), bassist Kevin Vecchione (from Five), and singer Meghan Krauss. A promotional video was uploaded to YouTube on October 6, 2012, and the band's self-titled album was released on April 23, 2013. They would also release three official music videos via YouTube. In a 2016 interview, Howe said that the band was no longer active.

== Session and touring career ==
Currently residing in Las Vegas, Nevada (having previously lived in Easton, Pennsylvania until around 2006), Howe continues to work as a session musician and producer, as well as providing online guitar lessons through his official website. From 2010 onwards he has toured Europe for the first time, having long stated a desire to tour the continent as a solo artist.

During his solo career, Howe has continuously made himself available as a session musician for many of the world's biggest pop stars. Most recently he has played with artists such as Christina Aguilera, Rihanna, Lady Antebellum, P Diddy, T-Pain and Salt-n-Pepa. In 1996, he replaced Jennifer Batten as primary guitarist during the Asian and European legs of singer Michael Jackson's HIStory World Tour. He would later provide guitar duties for singer Enrique Iglesias in 2000, which culminated in a series of high-profile televised performances and a European tour. The following two years saw Howe recruited as lead guitarist for boy band 'N Sync during two tours of the United States. After singer Justin Timberlake left 'N Sync, Howe continued to tour with him in 2003.

Eight years later, Howe teamed up again with Timberlake, as well as rapper T.I., for a performance at the 2009 Grammy Awards. In the same year, Howe played as part of keyboardist/violinist Eddie Jobson's Ultimate Zero Project, in a line-up which included bassists Tony Levin and John Wetton, and drummers Marco Minnemann and Simon Phillips. In 2011, Howe toured Vladivostok, Italy and Israel with drummer Dennis Chambers and bassist Stu Hamm. In November of that year, Michael Jackson's second posthumous album, Immortal, featured Howe's playing on "Dancing Machine" and "Beat It".

=== Protocol ===
In 2017 Howe joined the band Protocol, featuring Simon Phillips on drums, Ernest Tibbs on bass, and Otmaro Ruiz on keyboard. The Protocol 4 album was nominated for Best Contemporary Instrumental Album at the 61st Grammy Awards.

== Equipment ==
As of 2017, Howe is endorsed by DV Mark amplification, who released a 'Maragold' signature amplifier in 2014. He is also endorsed by DiMarzio, D'Addario and Floyd Rose. His effects pedals include Carl Martin, Pigtronix and T-Rex. Also in 2014, Howe was endorsed by Kiesel Guitars, who released a signature 'GH24 model in February 2015. A second signature guitar called the GH3 was released in 2017 by Kiesel Guitars. This guitar featured a three single coil pickups mounted on a pickguard giving it a look similar to the Fender Stratocaster. Kiesel also offers the option of having a Seymour Duncan humbucking pickup in the bridge position of the GH3. As of Feb 2022, Kiesel Guitars offers a Greg Howe signature guitar, with various customizable features such as number of frets and fingerboard wood, with a fixed two single coil, one (bridge) humbucker pickup layout.

== Discography ==
=== Studio albums ===
- 1988: Greg Howe
- 1993: Introspection
- 1994: Uncertain Terms
- 1995: Parallax
- 1996: Five
- 1999: Ascend
- 2000: Hyperacuity
- 2003: Extraction – with Dennis Chambers and Victor Wooten
- 2008: Sound Proof
- 2017: Wheelhouse

=== Compilations ===
- 2006: Collection: The Shrapnel Years

=== Collaborations ===
- 1995: Tilt – with Richie Kotzen
- 1997: Project – with Richie Kotzen

=== Howe II ===
- 1989: High Gear
- 1991: Now Hear This

=== Maragold ===
- 2013: Maragold

=== Other appearances ===
- 1996: Convergence – James Murphy
- 2001: Gentle Hearts – Tetsuo Sakurai
- 2004: Rhythm of Time – Jordan Rudess
- 2004: A Guitar Supreme – various guitarists compilation
- 2004: The Spirit Lives On – Jimi Hendrix tribute
- 2004: Gentle Hearts Tour 2004 – Tetsuo Sakurai
- 2005: Visions of an Inner Mounting Apocalypse: A Fusion Guitar Tribute – various guitarists compilation
- 2006: Io Canto – Laura Pausini
- 2008: Collection – Jason Becker
- 2008: Clean – Dave Martone
- 2009: Out of Oblivion – Ethan Brosh
- 2010: Vital World – Tetsuo Sakurai
- 2011: Immortal – Michael Jackson
- 2017: Protocol 4 – Simon Phillips
- 2018: Triumphant Hearts – Jason Becker
- 2024: Five Steps On The Sun – with DarWin, Simon Phillips, Mohini Dey
