= Hot Streak (album) =

2015 studio album by The Winery Dogs

Studio album by The Winery Dogs
- Released: October 2, 2015
- Genre: Hard rock
- Length: 65:48
- Label: Three Dog Music
- Producer: The Winery Dogs

The Winery Dogs chronology
The Winery Dogs (2013)	Hot Streak (2015)	Dog Years (2017)

Hot Streak is the second album by the American hard rock supergroup The Winery Dogs. It was released on October 2, 2015, but was premiered on September 29 on AllMusic.

Commenting on the record, guitarist and vocalist Richie Kotzen said:

We elevated the band to the next level. [...] There's always that worry with a follow-up record when you have a first one that's so well received, but I believed in it from day one. [...] I also like the fact that there's a commonality between the first and second records — and there's also an evolution too, as we've dug a little deeper.

The opening song "Oblivion", released as the album's first single, was composed during the band's debut album's sessions, and performed live in its subsequent tour. Because Kotzen had the lyrics for the chorus but not for the verses, every time the song was performed, the lyrics would be different.

"Empire" was almost left out of the album, but drummer Mike Portnoy "begged" Kotzen not to discard it since he appreciated the song and wanted to finish it.

The album debuted at No. 6 on Billboard's Top Rock Albums chart, selling 13,000 copies in its first week.

== Track listing ==
All tracks written by The Winery Dogs.

No.	Title	Length
1.	"Oblivion"	4:11
2.	"Captain Love"	5:06
3.	"Hot Streak"	5:10
4.	"How Long"	3:55
5.	"Empire"	6:08
6.	"Fire"	4:46
7.	"Ghost Town"	4:27
8.	"The Bridge"	4:49
9.	"War Machine"	5:11
10.	"Spiral"	5:50
11.	"Devil You Know"	4:29
12.	"Think It Over"	5:02
13.	"The Lamb"	6:44
14.	"Solid Ground" (Japanese edition bonus track)	5:25
Total length:		65:48

== Charts ==
Chart (2015)	Peak position
Oricon weekly chart	30
Billboard Japan Top Albums	20
US Billboard 200	30
US Billboard Top Hard Rock Albums	5
US Billboard Top Rock Albums	6
US Billboard Top Independent Albums	5
US Billboard Top Modern Rock/Alternative Albums	2

== Personnel ==
- Richie Kotzen – lead vocals, guitars, keyboards
- Billy Sheehan – bass, vocals
- Mike Portnoy – drums, percussion, vocals
