= High Gear (Howe II album) =

Studio album by Howe II
- Released: 1989
- Studio: Prairie Sun Recording Studios, Cotati, California
- Genre: Hard rock
- Length: 42:02
- Label: Shrapnel
- Producer: Mike Varney, Steve Fontano, Greg Howe

Howe II chronology
High Gear (1989)	Now Hear This (1991)

High Gear is the first studio album by the American hard rock band Howe II, released in 1989 through Shrapnel Records. Howe II was a short-lived group fronted by guitarist Greg Howe and his brother Albert Howe on vocals.

== Critical reception ==
Professional ratings
Review scores
Source	Rating
AllMusic	4/5 stars
Collector's Guide to Heavy Metal	7/10

Andy Hinds at AllMusic reviewed the album positively, saying that "The songs on High Gear are good, the riffs are killer, and the execution is flawless." He praised Greg Howe's guitar playing as "more effective than ever; focused like a laser, his brilliant solos drive home the point of the songs rather than being the point of the songs" and likened Albert Howe's vocals to David Lee Roth. More praise went to the band overall: "The entire band plays with an articulate, inspired precision and energy that is truly awesome." Journalist Martin Popoff described the album as "a rhythmic good time metal party" and the production as "a bit blocky, but vital like Van Halen".

== Track listing ==
All tracks are written by Albert Howe and Greg Howe.

No.	Title	Length
1.	"High Gear"	4:41
2.	"Carry the Torch"	4:01
3.	"Strat-O-Various"	1:13
4.	"Disorderly Conduct"	4:33
5.	"Thinking of You"	5:02
6.	"Standing on Line"	3:32
7.	"Ferocious"	4:34
8.	"Don't Let the Sloe Gin (Order the Wine)"	5:08
9.	"Party Favors"	3:30
10.	"Social Fever"	5:48
Total length:		42:02

== Personnel ==
Howe II

- Albert Howe – lead vocals
- Greg Howe – guitar, background vocals, mixing, co-producer
- Vern Parsons – bass, background vocals
- Joe Nevolo – drums, background vocals

Guest musicians

- Mike Varney – guitar solo (track 9), producer
- Jason Becker – guitar solo (track 9)

Production

Recorded at Prairie Sun Recording Studios, Cotati, California

- Steve Fontano – producer, engineer, mixing
- Joe Marquez – assistant engineer
- George Horn – mastering at Fantasy Studios, Berkeley, California
- Kerry Doyle – cover art guitar customization
