= The Winery Dogs =

American hard rock band

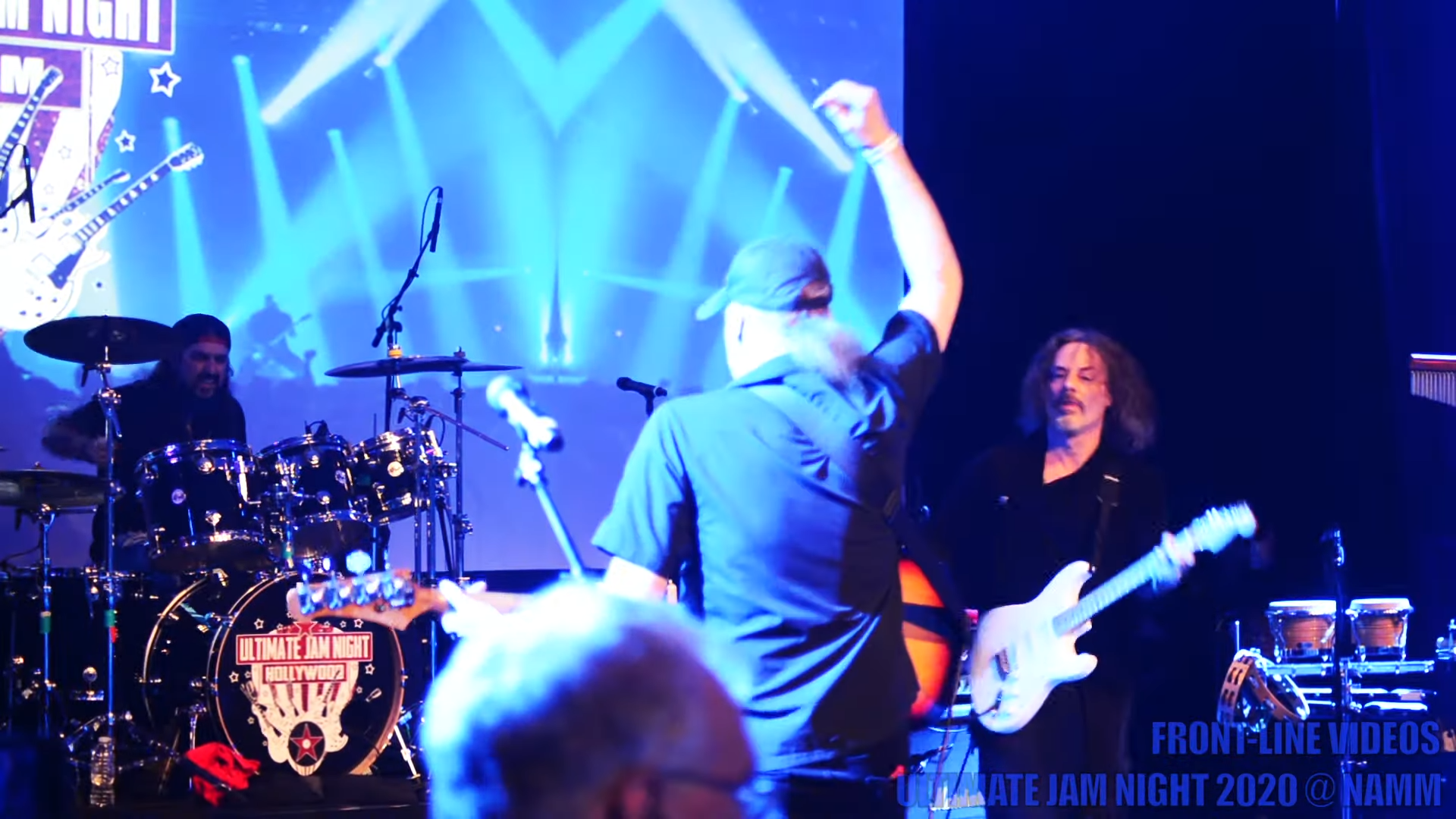
- The Winery Dogs performing in 2020

Background information
- Genres: Hard rock, blues rock, progressive rock
- Years active: 2012–present
- Labels: WHD, Loud & Proud, earMUSIC
- Spinoffs: Sons of Apollo
- Spinoff of: Mr. Big
- Members: Mike Portnoy; Billy Sheehan; Richie Kotzen

The Winery Dogs are an American hard rock supergroup formed in 2012. It consists of Mike Portnoy (drums), Billy Sheehan (bass), and Richie Kotzen (vocals and guitar).

== Background ==
The band was conceived by drummer Mike Portnoy and bassist Billy Sheehan, who were aiming to form a power trio rock band with a lead singer/guitarist as the frontman. After an aborted project, tentatively titled "Bad Apple", with guitarist/vocalist John Sykes, talk show host Eddie Trunk heard about it and suggested Richie Kotzen, who had previously played with Sheehan in the band Mr. Big from 1997 to 2002.

The three musicians got together at Richie Kotzen's studio in Los Angeles and at the end of the jam session, they had a few skeletons of songs that would appear on the debut album. After their first album success, they released a live concert DVD called Unleashed in Japan 2013: The Winery Dogs.

Prior to the Winery Dogs, all three members have had successful careers with other bands. Richie Kotzen is known as a former member of bands Poison and Mr. Big, as well as having a consistent solo career with many albums released. Billy Sheehan is known for playing with Mr. Big, Steve Vai, David Lee Roth, Talas, and Sons of Apollo. Mike Portnoy is known for being the original drummer of Dream Theater, Flying Colors, Transatlantic, Neal Morse Band, Sons of Apollo and Adrenaline Mob.

When asked about the band's main influences, Mike Portnoy commented that they are working towards a classic rock sound, influenced by Led Zeppelin, Cream, Jimi Hendrix, Grand Funk Railroad, as well as newer artists such as Soundgarden, Alice in Chains, the Black Crowes and Lenny Kravitz.

The band's self-titled debut album was released in Japan on May 5, 2013 through Victor subsidiary WHD Entertainment, with a worldwide release following on July 23, 2013 through Loud & Proud Records. It was produced by Jay Ruston. It features 13 songs and they switched out the song "Time Machine" with the song "Criminal" for the Japan edition.

In June 2015, the band entered a studio around Los Angeles to record their second album. In a July interview, Portnoy said the album was about to begin mixing that month, and it should be released before they begin their October tour. The album, titled Hot Streak, was released on October 2, 2015.

The Winery Dogs also have a band clinic in the summer called Dog Camp. This camp allows musicians and fans to come meet, jam with and learn from the band. Not only does it include individual clinics, but it also incorporates a band setting as well.

In April 2017, it was announced by Kotzen that Winery Dogs were taking a break. Kotzen was quoted as saying the band were "still friends", however, and it's likely there will be more releases from them in the future.

On December 5, 2018, Mike Portnoy announced that The Winery Dogs would go on a one-month tour of the U.S. in May 2019.

The band's third album, III, was released on February 3, 2023. The Winery Dogs conducted a world tour from February to November 2023 in the US, Latin America, and the EU/UK regions.

== Band members ==
- Richie Kotzen – lead vocals, guitars, keyboards, piano (2012–present)
- Billy Sheehan – bass, backing vocals (2012–present)
- Mike Portnoy – drums, backing vocals (2012–present)
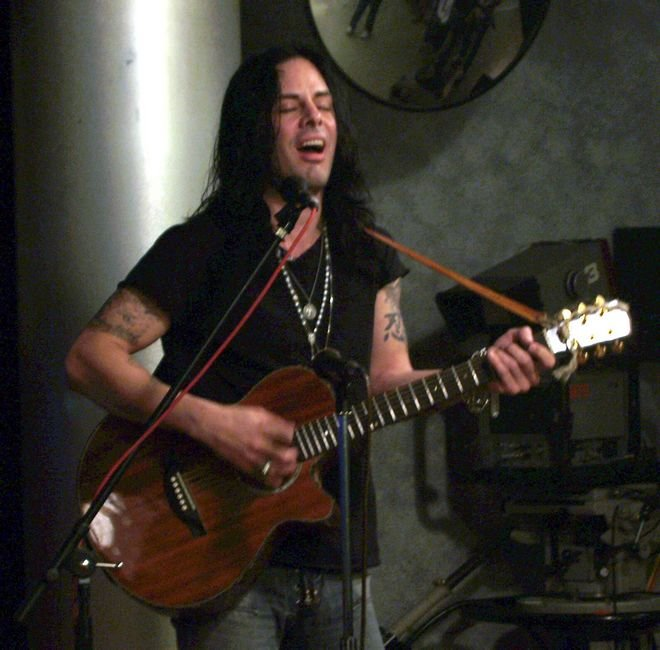
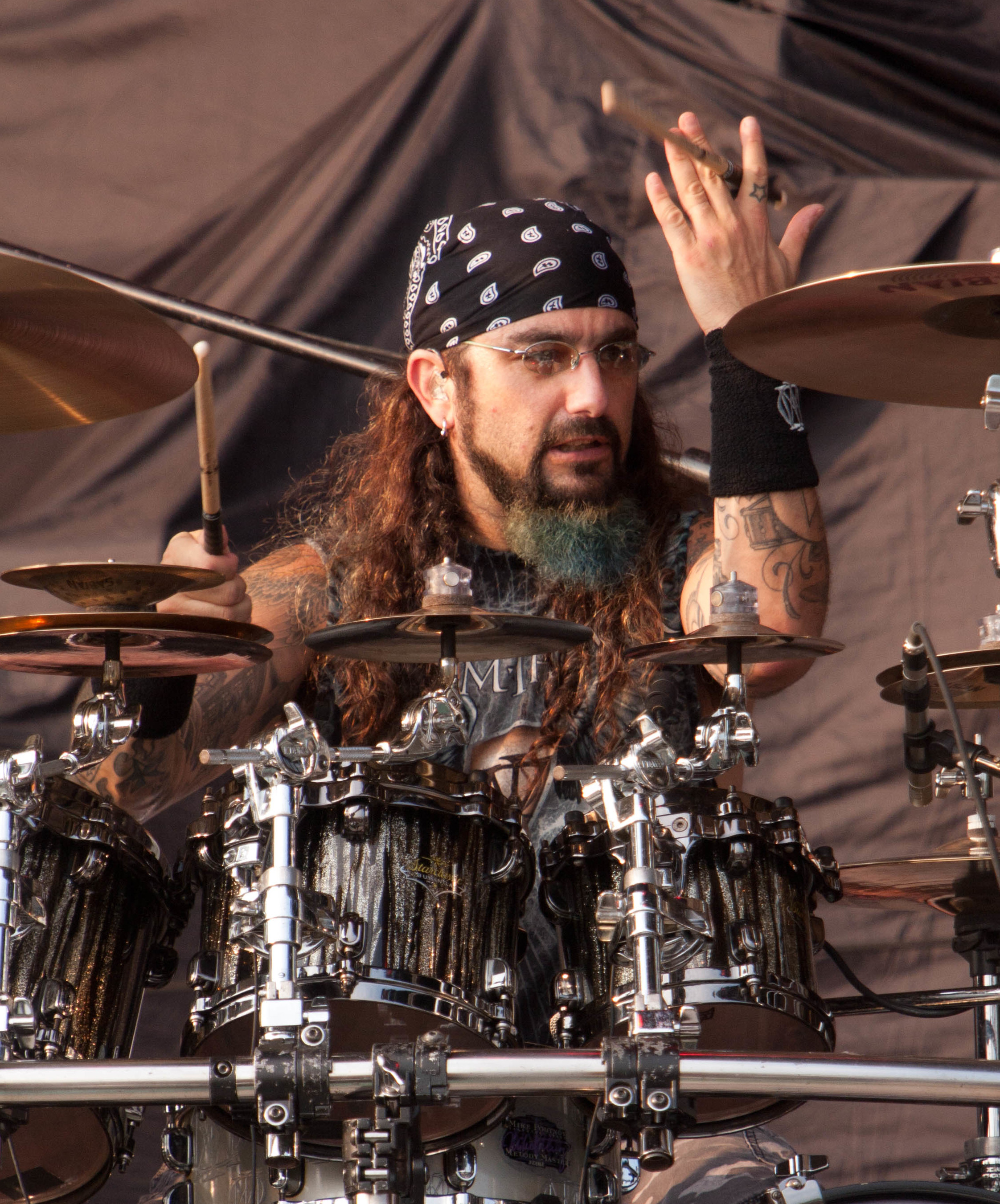
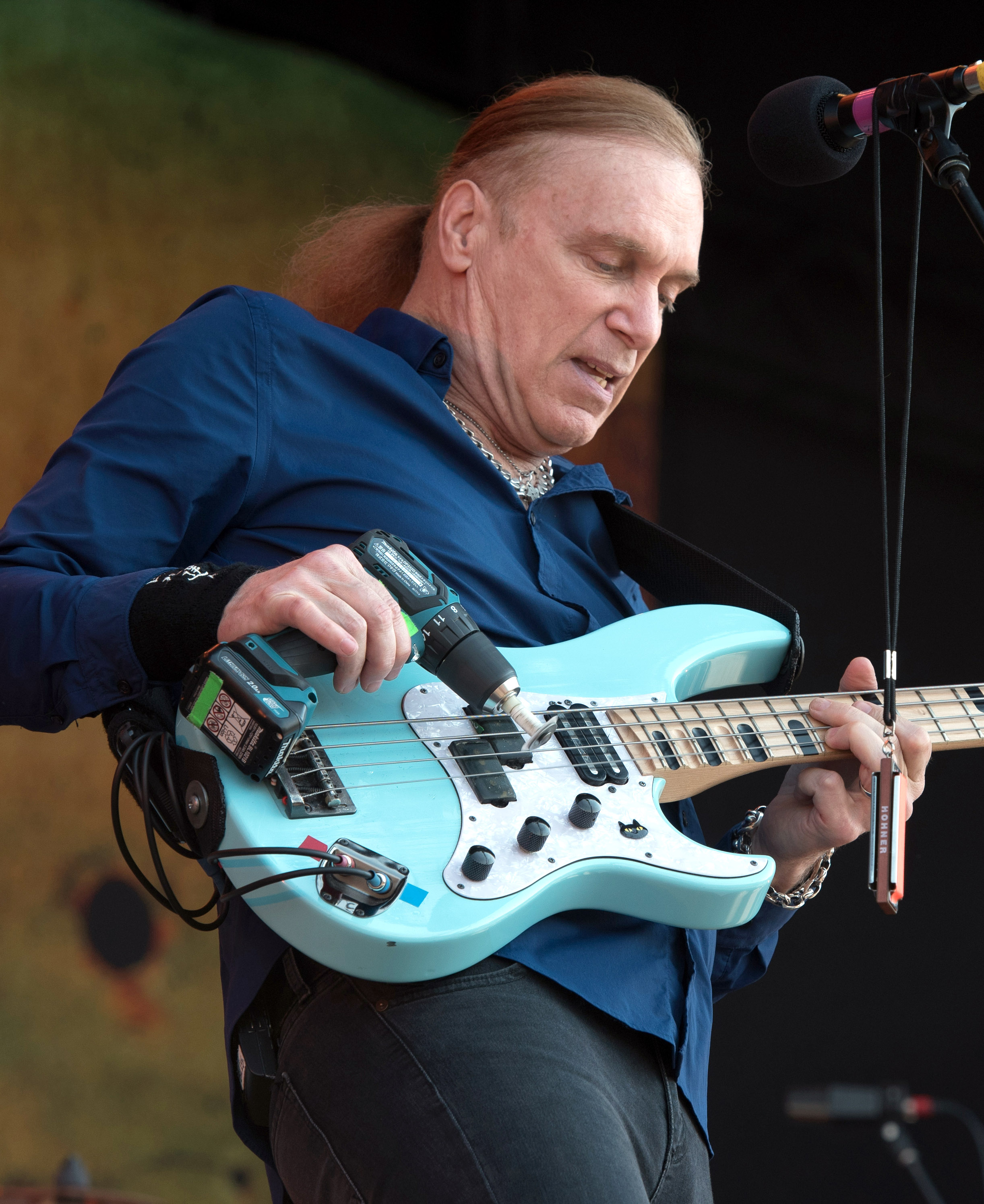
Left to right: Kotzen, Portnoy and Sheehan

== Discography ==
=== Studio albums ===
Year	Title	US	CAN	FIN	JPN	Additional North American chart positions
2013	The Winery Dogs: Released: May 5 (Japan) July 23 (Worldwide); Label: Loud & Proud; Format: Digital download, CD, LP	27	115	38	18	#3 – Top Alternative Albums; #4 – Top Independent Albums; #4 – Tastemakers; #5 – Top Rock Albums; #8 – Top Internet Albums; #30 – Canada Top Internet Albums
2015	Hot Streak: Released: September 23 (Japan) October 2 (Worldwide); Label: Loud & Proud; Format: Digital download, CD, LP	30	—	—	30	
2023	III: Released: February 3; Label: Three Dog Music; Format: Digital download, CD	—	—	—	40	

=== EPs ===
- Dog Years (2017)

=== Live albums ===
- Unleashed in Japan 2013 (2013)
- Dog Years: Live in Santiago & Beyond 2013-2016 (2017)
