= Go Faster =

Studio album by Richie Kotzen
- Released: 2007
- Recorded: at 'The House'
- Genre: Hard rock, blues rock, funk rock, soul, jazz fusion
- Length: 52:55
- Label: Headroom – Inc.
- Producer: Richie Kotzen

Richie Kotzen chronology
| Into the Black (2006) | Go Faster (2007) | Live in São Paulo (2008) |

Alternative cover
- Return of the Mother Head's Family Reunion

Go Faster is the sixteenth official studio album by guitarist/vocalist Richie Kotzen. While Go Faster was only released in US, the album was released in Europe and Japan under different name called Return of the Mother Head's Family Reunion with different cover and distinct songs order plus a bonus track.

A video of "Chase It" was shot in the summer of 2008 in Venice, Italy.

== Track listing ==
All tracks are written by Richie Kotzen.

Return Of The Mother Head's Family Reunion
| No. | Title | Length |
|---|---|---|
| 1. | "Go Faster" | 2:56 |
| 2. | "You Know That" | 3:56 |
| 3. | "Fooled Again" | 8:01 |
| 4. | "Faith" | 6:41 |
| 5. | "Bad Things" | 4:57 |
| 6. | "Dust" | 5:29 |
| 7. | "Chase It" | 3:52 |
| 8. | "Do It to Yourself" | 3:45 |
| 9. | "You’re Crazy" | 5:19 |
| 10. | "Feed My Head" | 3:38 |
| 11. | "Can You Feel It" | 4:25 |
| Total length: | | 50:19 |

Go Faster
| No. | Title | Length |
|---|---|---|
| 1. | "Go Faster" | 2:56 |
| 2. | "Feed My Head" | 3:38 |
| 3. | "Fooled Again" | 8:01 |
| 4. | "Can You Feel It" | 4:25 |
| 5. | "You’re Crazy" | 5:19 |
| 6. | "Chase It" | 3:52 |
| 7. | "Bad Things" | 4:57 |
| 8. | "Do It to Yourself" | 3:45 |
| 9. | "Dust" | 5:29 |
| 10. | "Faith" | 6:41 |
| 11. | "You Know That" | 3:56 |

Japanese version
| No. | Title | Length |
|---|---|---|
| 12. | "Satellite" (bonus track) | 4:16 |

European version
| No. | Title | Length |
|---|---|---|
| 12. | "Drift" (demo) (bonus track) | 4:16 |

== Personnel ==
- Richie Kotzen – vocals, guitar, mandolin
- Arlan Schierbaum – Hammond A-100 organ, Wurlitzer & Rhodes electric pianos, clavinet, Minimoog, Oberheim Two Voice, mellotron, chamberlin, acoustic piano, Yamaha E-70
- Virgil McKoy – bass
- Franklin Vanderbilt – drums and percussion
- August Kotzen – additional background vocals (on "Go Faster", "Can You Feel It", "Faith", "You Know That")
- Lole Diro – recording engineer, mixing
- Dave Donnelly – mastering at DNA Mastering studios
