= Into the Black (album) =

2006 album by Richie Kotzen

Studio album by Richie Kotzen
- Released: December 12, 2006
- Recorded: Headroom – Inc. & The House
- Genre: Post-grunge, blues rock, alternative rock
- Length: 44:36
- Label: Headroom – Inc. The House
- Producer: Richie Kotzen

Richie Kotzen chronology
Ai Senshi Z×R (2006)	Into the Black (2006)	Go Faster (2007)

Into the Black
Review scores
Source	Rating
Metal Express Radio	7/10 stars

Into the Black is the fourteenth solo album by guitarist/vocalist Richie Kotzen. The album has a parental advisory sticker on the front due to the song You Can't Save Me, making it the only Kotzen record to have one. You Can't Save Me was the first song he wrote for the album.

== Track listing ==
No.	Title	Length
1.	"You Can't Save Me"	4:17
2.	"Misunderstood"	4:11
3.	"Fear"	4:47
4.	"The Shadow"	4:37
5.	"Doin' What The Devil Says To Do"	5:17
6.	"Till You Put Me Down"	5:22
7.	"Sacred Ground"	4:09
8.	"Your Lies"	3:42
9.	"Livin' In Bliss"	4:12
10.	"My Angel"	4:03

== Personnel ==
- Richie Kotzen – primary artist, arranger, composer, producer
- Alex Todorov – sound engineering, mixing, recorder
- Dave Donnelly – mastering at DNA Mastering
