= Uncertain Terms =

Studio album by Greg Howe
- Released: November 8, 1994
- Recorded: Greg Howe's home studio in Easton, Pennsylvania
- Genre: Instrumental rock, jazz fusion
- Length: 45:22
- Label: Shrapnel
- Producer: Greg Howe

Greg Howe chronology
Introspection (1993)	Uncertain Terms (1994)	Parallax (1995)

Uncertain Terms is the third studio album by guitarist Greg Howe, released on November 8, 1994 through Shrapnel Records.

== Critical reception ==
Professional ratings
Review scores
Source	Rating
AllMusic	3/5 stars

Andy Hinds at AllMusic gave Uncertain Terms three stars out of five, describing it as following in the footsteps of its 1993 predecessor Introspection and being "Crammed full of completely over the top rock/fusion guitar solos". He praised Howe's guitar playing as having "unfathomable speed and stamina" and that he "has taken all of the innovations of Eddie Van Halen and Yngwie Malmsteen and expanded them to monstrous proportions." He also noted "5 Mile Limit" and "Stringed Sanity" as highlights.

== Track listing ==
All music is composed by Greg Howe.

No.	Title	Length
1.	"Faulty Outlet"	4:24
2.	"5 Mile Limit"	4:43
3.	"Run with It"	4:09
4.	"Business Conduct"	4:35
5.	"Public and Private"	5:31
6.	"Song for Rachelle"	5:17
7.	"Stringed Sanity"	6:03
8.	"Solid State"	5:20
9.	"Second Thought"	5:20
Total length:		45:22

== Personnel ==
- Greg Howe – guitar, drums, bass, engineering, mixing, production
- Lee Wertman – guitar synthesizer solo (track 3)
- Kenneth K. Lee Jr. – mastering
