= Al Caldwell =

- Born: St. Louis, Missouri, United States
- Genres: R&B
- Occupation(s): Instrumentalist, studio engineer, producer
- Instrument(s): Bass guitar, banjo
- Member of: Travelling Black Hillbillies
- Website: www.tbhillbilly.com

Al Caldwell is an American R&B musician who mainly plays the bass guitar and banjo with the Travelling Black Hillbillies. He is also a studio engineer and producer.

== Career ==
Born in St. Louis, Missouri, Caldwell started out as a clarinet player and moved on to the trumpet. He attended Mississippi Valley State on scholarship. He has played for a variety of entertainers including Vanessa Williams, He also works for hire on studio albums as a session musician. He has performed on a number of television shows.

When Caldwell plays electric bass, he usually performs using Extended-range basses, (or "ERBs"), which are electric bass guitars with more range (usually meaning more strings, but sometimes additional frets are added for more range) than the "standard" 4-string bass guitar. The techniques used to play the extended-range bass are closely related to those used for basses, including finger plucking, slapping, popping, and tapping, though a plectrum (pick) is very rarely used. The upper strings of an extended-range bass allow bassists to adopt playing styles of the electric guitar. One such style is the practice of "comping", or playing a rhythmic chordal accompaniment to an improvised solo. Al Caldwell was the first MIDI 9 string bassist. Conklin Basses made the first Midi 9 string for Al Caldwell. Al Caldwell had Benavente Basses make the first 11 string MIDI bass.

== Discography ==
- 2004 9 String Human Being - Baby Al Music
- 2004 Good Livin - Baby Al Music
- 2004 Hillbilly Soul - Baby Al Music
- 2004 Hootananny Soul - Baby Al Music
- 2005 Hell if I know - Baby Al Music
- 2005 Forbidden - Baby Al Music
- 2005 Bass for Lovers - Baby Al Music
