= Introspection (Greg Howe album) =

Studio album by Greg Howe
- Released: 1993
- Studio: Greg Howe's home studio, Easton, Pennsylvania; Kevin Soffera's home studio
- Genre: Instrumental rock, jazz fusion
- Length: 41:27
- Label: Shrapnel
- Producer: Greg Howe

Greg Howe chronology
Greg Howe (1988)	Introspection (1993)	Uncertain Terms (1994)

Introspection is the second studio album by guitarist Greg Howe, released in 1993 through Shrapnel Records.

== Critical reception ==
Professional ratings
Review scores
Source	Rating
AllMusic	4/5 stars

Andy Hinds at AllMusic awarded Introspection four stars out of five, calling it "a breathtaking showcase of one of the best rock/fusion players in the world" and praising Howe's guitar work: "Howe's wide-interval scale figures and inspired phrasing—delivered at light speed—are truly remarkable. ... Howe's playing has evolved so much from his early Shrapnel days that it's hard to believe it's the same person." In particular he highlighted the stylistic shift from Howe's shred-oriented 1988 debut album, Greg Howe, to a more fusion-based approach on Introspection. However, he criticized the album's production values as "antiseptic" and described the triggered drums as "totally lame".

== Track listing ==
All music is composed by Greg Howe, except where noted.

No.	Title	Length
1.	"Jump Start"	4:42
2.	"Button Up"	6:15
3.	"Come and Get It"	5:17
4.	"In Step" (Howe, Alsamad Caldwell)	4:50
5.	"Desiderata"	2:56
6.	"No Place Like Home"	4:23
7.	"Direct Injection"	5:35
8.	"Pay as You Go"	7:29
Total length:		41:27

== Personnel ==
- Greg Howe – guitar, keyboard, engineering, producer
- Kevin Soffera – drums
- Alsamad Caldwell – bass (except tracks 3, 6)
- Vern Parsons – bass (tracks 3, 6), engineering
- Mike Rafferty – engineering
- Chris Midkiff – mixing
- Kenneth K. Lee Jr. – mastering
