= Richie Kotzen =

American guitarist and singer (born 1970)

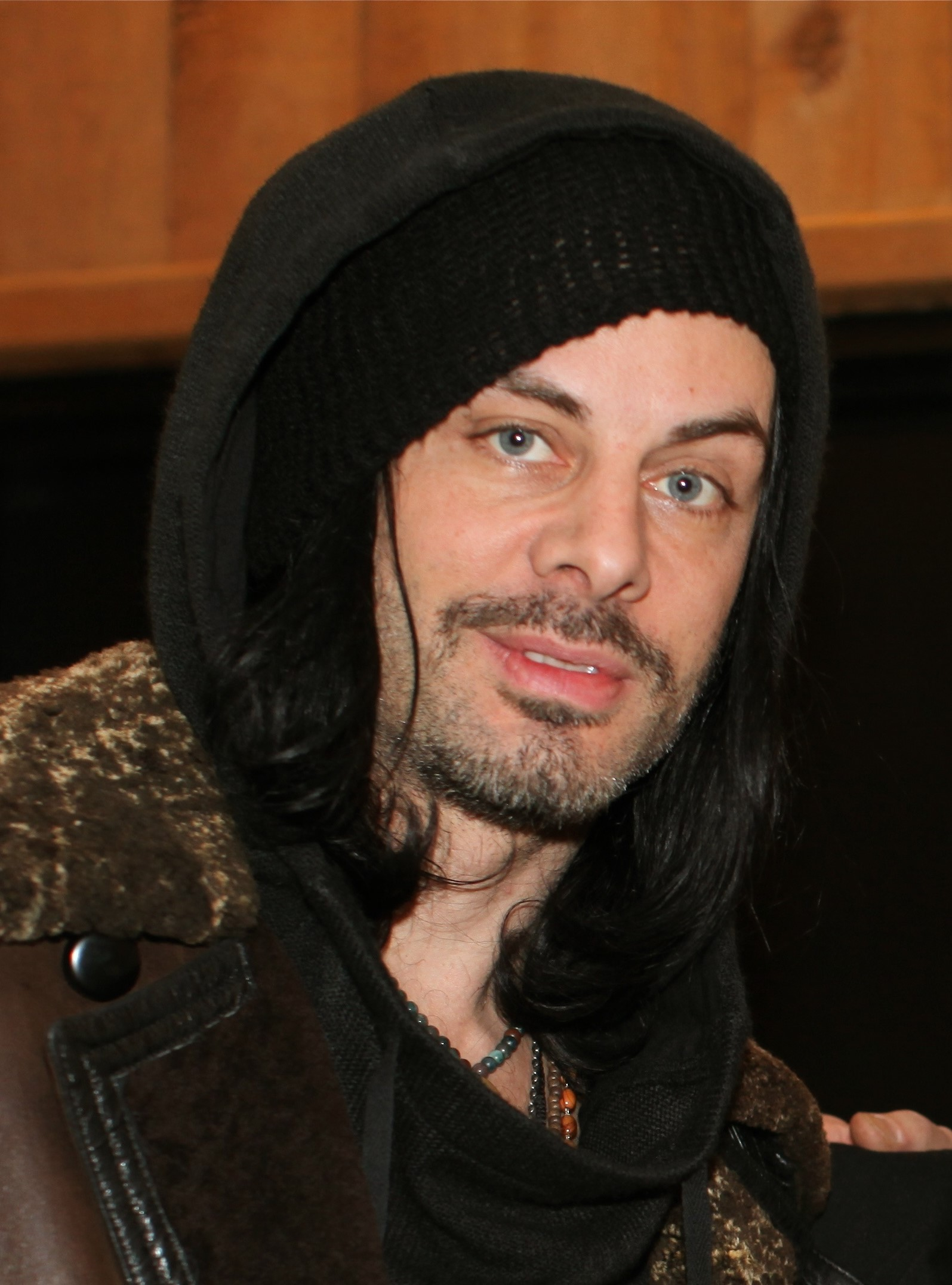
- Kotzen in 2011

Background information
- Also known as: Kent Stanfield
- Born: Richard Dale Kotzen Jr. February 3, 1970 (age 56); Reading, Pennsylvania, U.S.
- Genres: Hard rock; blues rock; rhythm and blues; blue-eyed soul; jazz fusion; pop rock; progressive rock; funk rock; instrumental rock; glam metal
- Occupations: Musician; singer; songwriter; producer
- Instruments: Guitar; vocals; piano
- Works: Discography
- Years active: 1987–present
- Labels: Shrapnel; DGC; MCA; Spitfire; Headroom-Inc
- Member of: The Winery Dogs; Forty Deuce; Smith/Kotzen
- Formerly of: Poison; Vertú; Mr. Big
- Spouse: Julia Lage (m. 2017)
- Website: richiekotzen.com

Richard Dale Kotzen Jr. (born February 3, 1970) is an American rock guitarist, singer, and songwriter. As a solo artist, Kotzen has a back catalogue of more than 20 album releases. He was signed to California-based Shrapnel Records from 1988 to 1991, and again from 1995 to 1997. He was a member of glam metal band Poison from 1991 to 1993, Mr. Big from 1999 to 2002, and since 2012, has been the frontman of the band The Winery Dogs.

== Biography ==
Kotzen began playing piano at the age of five. At the age of seven, he was inspired to learn the electric guitar, by the band Kiss. He started his career in a band named Arthur's Museum. Kotzen was eventually discovered by Shrapnel Records' Mike Varney, and he recorded his first solo album by the age of 19, the first of two instrumental records, simply entitled Richie Kotzen. He created the video Rock Chops for REH video in 1989, highlighting many of his formative techniques, including using wide-intervals and fluid sweeping. One year later, a second solo album called Fever Dream was released, which was the first one to also feature his lead vocals. Since then, Kotzen has released a long series of more than twenty albums with musical influences ranging from rock, hard rock, pop, blues, blue-eyed-soul, R&B and funk to jazz fusion.

In 1991, at age 21, Kotzen joined glam metal band Poison, co-writing and performing on the album Native Tongue. This album produced two top-twenty singles which Kotzen co-wrote, "Stand" and "Until You Suffer Some (Fire and Ice)". He was 7 to 9 years younger than all of the other members, and later said it felt surreal to be in a band that sold 20 million albums while only in his early 20s. Kotzen was fired from Poison in 1993 when it was discovered that he had become romantically involved with drummer Rikki Rockett's former fiancée Deanna Eve. Kotzen went on to marry Eve, and in June 1997 he had a daughter with her named August. Kotzen and Eve later divorced. In a 1999 VH1 interview, Poison singer Bret Michaels said he hadn't spoken to Kotzen since he left Poison and never wanted to see him again, although Kotzen stated in 2021 that he eventually had friendly encounters with the members of Poison over the years. Kotzen also stated he was proud of the work he did with Poison, labelling Native Tongue a "fantastic record".

After leaving Poison, Kotzen then focused on his solo career, regularly releasing song oriented, R&B/soul/blues and funk influenced melodic rock albums. He also made guest appearances on several albums by artists like Glenn Hughes, Stevie Salas and T.M. Stevens. In 1995 and 1997 he collaborated with Greg Howe on two jazz rock fusion albums.

In 1999, Kotzen replaced Paul Gilbert as guitarist in the mainstream hard rock band Mr. Big, performing on their album Get Over It. He also contributed guitars and songwriting to their subsequent release Actual Size. The record included the Kotzen song "Shine".

In 2001, while still in Mr. Big, Kotzen recorded and released another solo album called Slow, which contains a mix of bluesy rock for which a music video was filmed. On some of the songs on Slow Kotzen experimented with the use of a drum computer, while on others he played drums. After Mr. Big disbanded in 2002, Kotzen continued his solo career, and didn't return when the band was reformed in 2009, with Gilbert returned on guitars. He released his next solo album Change, in 2003.

In 2002, Kotzen established a recording studio and production company. He has since produced his own albums and collaborated with various figures in rock (e.g. Gene Simmons), jazz and fusion, including jazz legend Stanley Clarke, with whom he realized the project Vertú.

The 2004, follow-up-album to Change, Get Up featured a more edgy, aggressive rock sound. It was more hard rock oriented than any of his previous solo outputs since Fever Dream and contains the ballad "Remember".

In 2005, Kotzen teamed up with three Japanese punk rockers to form the short-lived Forty Deuce-Project, which only lasted long enough to record and release one album.

Later in the same year, Kotzen collaborated with Funk Rock Fusion guitarist Steve Saluto on his album Rough Beat.

In 2006, Kotzen was the opening act for The Rolling Stones in Japan on their Bigger Bang tour.

During the year 2006, Kotzen produced and released two solo studio albums, first Ai Senshi Z×R, an album on which he played several English sung rock covers of theme songs from the Japanese Gundam anime franchise, and only nine months later Into the Black, containing ten self-penned rock songs

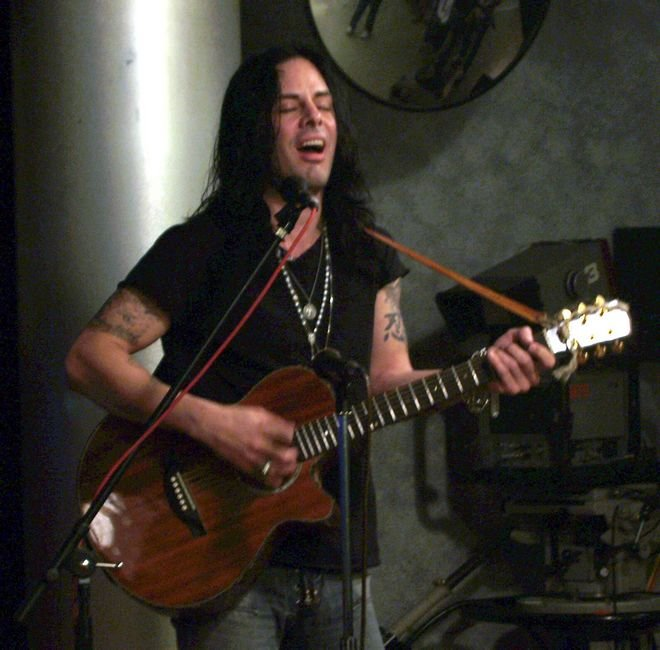
Kotzen performing in 2007

In 2007, Go Faster was released, which alternatively was named Return of the Mother Head's Family Reunion in Europe and Japan. It includes the eight-minute-song "Fooled Again", and the soft pop ballad "Chase It", for which a music video clip was filmed in Venice.

In 2008, Kotzen's first live album, simply entitled Live in São Paulo was released, followed by the acclaimed Peace Sign album in 2009, for which Kotzen played and recorded all instruments.

In 2009, Kotzen also teamed up with songwriter/producer Richie Zito for a short-lived project they called Wilson Hawk. Wilson Hawk produced one album called The Road, on which they celebrate some R&B and soul influenced pop music in the style of the late 60s and 70s and many soulful pop ballads.

After the "Peace Sign" world tour, Kotzen released one single in 2010, Angry Boy.

In 2011, Kotzen released a full-length Solo album titled 24 Hours. The release was followed by another tour.

In 2012, he joined forces with Mike Portnoy and Billy Sheehan to form the rock supergroup The Winery Dogs who released their self-titled debut album on May 15, 2013, in Japan, with a worldwide release on July 23 of the same year. A world tour followed.

After that, Kotzen went on an acoustic solo tour and started working on his 20th solo effort, which became the Cannibals album, that was released on January, 5th, 2015. Cannibals features a more relaxed, and often R&B influenced rock/pop sound. Kotzen's wife, bassist/vocalist Julia Lage, added some background vocals and also appears in the music video for the song "In An Instant". On the song "I'm All In" Kotzen shares the vocals with Doug Pinnick of King's X

Only nine months later, on October 2, 2015, The Winery Dogs released their second album Hot Streak, followed by another world tour.

By the end of 2016, The Winery Dogs went on hiatus and Kotzen focused on his next solo record Salting Earth, which came out on April 14, 2017. The album incorporates a mix of blues rock and laid back pop/rock songs. From August until late September Kotzen completed a European tour.

On January 25, 2018, Kotzen released a video for his new single called The Damned, a heavy blues rocker, via YouTube, which was filmed at Paramount Ranch in Agoura, California by director Vicente Cordero. On June 5, 2018, a second video single called Riot was released via YouTube, which was again directed by Vicente Cordero. On December 11, 2018, Kotzen announced a Winery Dogs Tour through the US for May 2019, via his official Facebook page, which they completed successfully then.

On June 11, 2019, another solo single titled Venom was published, in the style of The Winery Dogs, accompanied by a music video.

For his 50th birthday in 2020, Kotzen wanted to offer his fans something special. This resulted in the 50-track triple-album titled 50 for 50. For the song "Devil's Hand", a video clip was filmed by the seaside, which was again directed by Vicente Cordero, and also includes scenes with Kotzen's wife, Julia Lage. Another music video for the song "As You Are" was shot by Kotzen himself, dancing and playing in his kitchen wearing a pajama, while he was in quarantine with COVID-19.

In the second half of 2020, Kotzen began working on a project called Smith/Kotzen with Iron Maiden guitarist Adrian Smith. Nine songs were created and appear on the eponymous album. The album was released on March 26, 2021, and was produced by Smith and Kotzen and mixed by Kevin Shirley.

On November 26, 2021, Smith/Kotzen released a four-track EP titled Better Days.

In January 2022, they went on a club tour through California (US), with a UK tour following in February and March. Kotzen's wife, Julia Lage, took over on bass guitar. In June 2024 Kotzen toured Europe and played at the Sweden Rock Festival.

== Guitar playing style ==
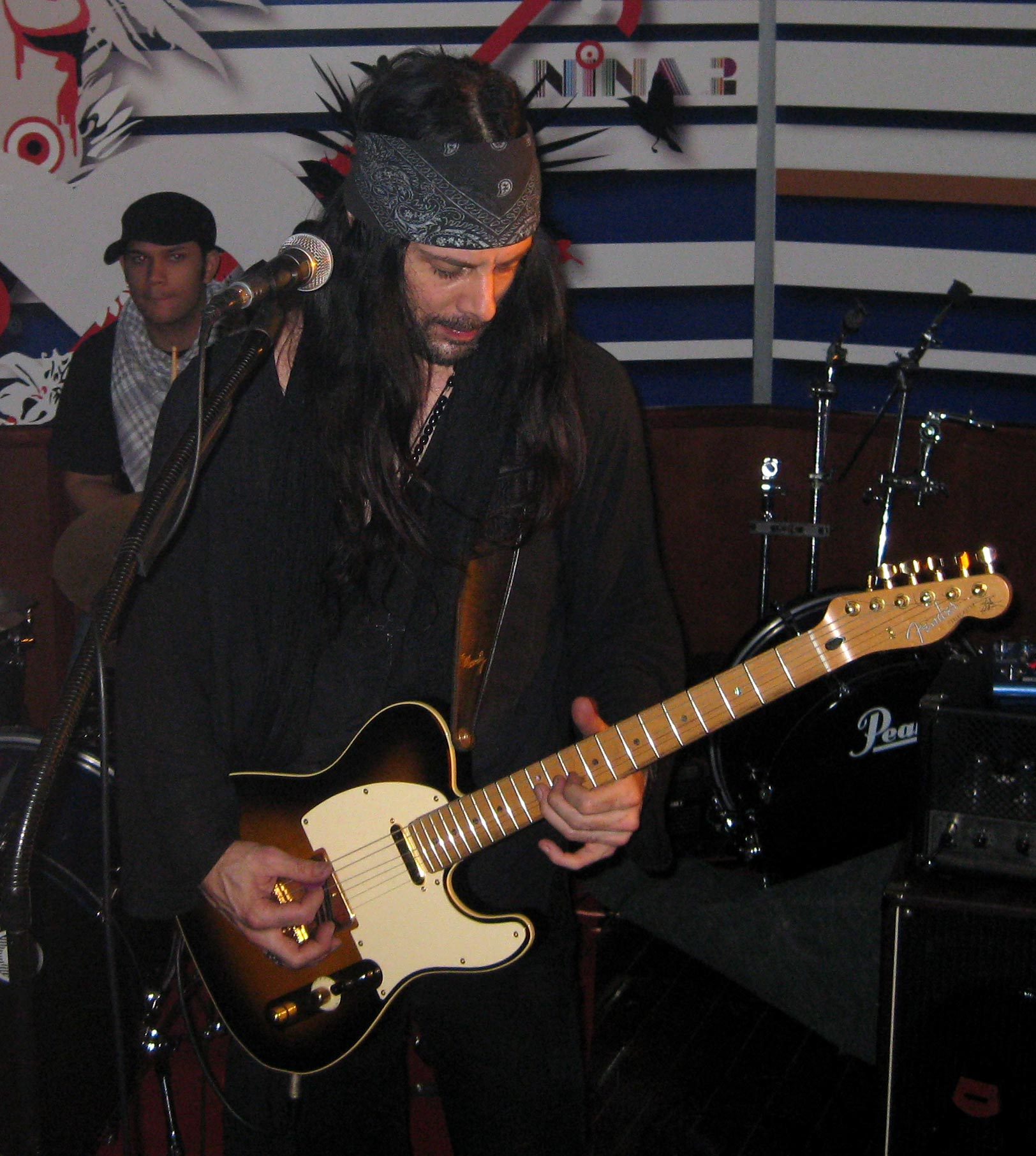
Kotzen in 2009

Kotzen has described his style as a mix of rock, blues, heavy metal, jazz, fusion, and soul music. Kotzen utilizes a heavy amount of legato and sweeping in his playing. As his main influences, he lists Jimi Hendrix, Stevie Ray Vaughan, Eddie Van Halen, Jason Becker (who produced his first album), Allan Holdsworth, and many other jazz and fusion players. Starting around 2007, Kotzen has opted to stop using guitar picks and been playing exclusively with his fingers, although there is a picture from 2009 right above this paragraph showing him using a pick. As of the 2026 Smith/Kotzen tour, however, Kotzen appears to have started playing primarily with a pick once again.

== Instruments and equipment ==
Kotzen has used Fender electric guitars for most of his career, most notably his signature model Telecasters and Stratocasters, as well as other custom-made models. Currently, there are two Richie Kotzen signature models made by Fender Japan – a Stratocaster (STR-145RK) and a Telecaster (TLR-155RK). Both guitars feature ash bodies with laminated flame maple caps, maple necks and one piece maple fretboards with abalone dot inlays and 22 super jumbo frets. The Telecaster model features a DiMarzio Chopper T pickup in the bridge position (single-spaced humbucker) and a DiMarzio Twang King in the neck position. The Stratocaster is fitted with three custom made DiMarzio single coil pickups.

At the beginning of his career, Kotzen used Ibanez guitars and Laney amplifiers before switching to Fender guitars and Marshall amplifiers in the early 1990s. He used Marshall Super Lead, JCM800 and JCM900 models as well as Yamaha DG Series amps in the late 1990s. Yamaha DG1000 preamp with Marshall EL34 100/100 power amp, and Yamaha DG130H, Yamaha DG100 combo etc.

In 2005, Cornford Amplification issued a Richie Kotzen signature model – RK100, a single channel tube amp head developed and designed in collaboration with Kotzen to suit his expansive playing style. Cornford ceased production of all amplifiers, including the RK100, in 2013. There were also matching signature model speaker cabinets, equipped with one or four Celestion Vintage 30 12" speakers. Both the amplifier head and the speaker cabinets were the only Cornford models generally supplied with Kotzen-spec black Tolex covering. The 4 x 12" cabinet also includes a special locking jack socket on the rear.

In 2013 he used a Fender Vibro-King amp with Winery Dogs.

Now Richie uses Victory Amplifiers. He has his very own Signature Victory Amp. Kotzen prefers not to use many pedals (or effects, in general) when playing live. However, over the years, he has been using several versions of Sobbat Drivebraker and Glowvibe pedals on top of Marshall amps when not playing with the Cornford. He also uses reverb and delay effects of his signature series Zoom G2R effects processor, which is connected in the effects loop of the amplifier. In 2014, Tech 21 started selling the Richie Kotzen Signature RK5 Fly Rig, which was developed in close collaboration with Richie, who used the final prototype for the bulk of his 2014 tour with the Winery Dogs.

== Discography ==
=== Solo ===
- Richie Kotzen (1989)
- Fever Dream (1990)
- Electric Joy (1991)
- Mother Head's Family Reunion (1994)
- The Inner Galactic Fusion Experience (1995)
- Wave of Emotion (1996)
- Something to Say (1997)
- What Is... (1998)
- Bi-Polar Blues (1999)
- Break It All Down (1999)
- Slow (2001)
- Change (2003)
- Acoustic Cuts (2003)
- Get Up (2004)
- Ai Senshi Z×R (music from the anime series Gundam) (2006)
- Into The Black (2006)
- Go Faster/Return of the Mother Head's Family Reunion (2007)
- Peace Sign (2009)
- 24 Hours (2011)
- Cannibals (2015)
- Salting Earth (2017)
- 50 for 50 (2020)
- Nomad (2024)

=== Poison ===
- Native Tongue (1993)

=== Mr. Big ===
- Get Over It (1999)
- Actual Size (2001)

=== The Winery Dogs ===
- The Winery Dogs (2013)
- Hot Streak (2015)
- III (2023)

=== Smith/Kotzen ===
- Smith/Kotzen (2021)
- Black Light/White Noise (2025)

Wilson Hawk

- The Road (2009)
