= Speed Metal Symphony =

- Cover backdrop by Guy Aitchison

Studio album by Cacophony
- Released: 1987
- Recorded: May–June 1987
- Studios: Prairie Sun, Cotati, California
- Genres: Heavy metal; neoclassical metal
- Length: 45:07
- Label: Shrapnel
- Producers: Marty Friedman; Mike Varney

Cacophony chronology
Speed Metal Symphony (1987)	Go Off! (1989)

Speed Metal Symphony is the first studio album by the American heavy metal band Cacophony, released in 1987 through Shrapnel Records.

== Music ==
Andy Hinds of AllMusic said Speed Metal Symphony was "one of the more extreme entries in the Shrapnel Records catalog." He described the album's sound as "twin Yngwie Malmsteens playing simultaneously over a bed of Megadeth rhythm tracks." He said the album's songs were performed at "warp-speed tempos".

== Reception and legacy ==
Professional ratings
Review scores
Source	Rating
AllMusic	2.5/5 stars
Collector's Guide to Heavy Metal	6/10
Rock Hard	8.5/10

In a contemporary review, Frank Trojan of Rock Hard magazine found Speed Metal Symphony "much harder and faster" than the works of Tony MacAlpine, Vinnie Moore or Yngwie Malmsteen, "which means that some tracks are speed kills with super solos". He added that, although "the pure instrumentals are, unfortunately, again the usual mixtures of classic elements and endless revival on well-known riffs and standards, Cacophony could appeal to a bigger circle by their rough, and sometimes also partly speedy way of playing, than just pure guitar freaks." The album was re-released on CD in 1991.

Andy Hinds at AllMusic called Speed Metal Symphony "tough to digest". He noted its technical complexity and lack of production quality, while suggesting that it is "some of the most indulgent music ever recorded." Praise was nevertheless given to the skill of guitarists Jason Becker and Marty Friedman, though Hinds suggested that both their subsequent solo releases (Perpetual Burn and Dragon's Kiss, respectively) were superior. Canadian journalist Martin Popoff defined the album "an expertly played, mostly instrumental affair" and "a slightly less arch and arcane version of Yngwie's debut", criticising Peter Marrino's vocals "buried in the mix" and not "up to standards" of the other musicians.

In 2009, Guitar World magazine ranked the album ninth on its list of the all-time top ten shred albums.

== Track listing ==
Side one
No.	Title	Writer(s)	Length
1.	"Savage"	Marty Friedman	5:48
2.	"Where My Fortune Lies"	Friedman, Jason Becker	4:32
3.	"The Ninja"	Friedman	7:24
4.	"Concerto"	Friedman, Becker	4:37

Side two
No.	Title	Writer(s)	Length
5.	"Burn the Ground"	Friedman, Becker	6:50
6.	"Desert Island"	Friedman	6:24
7.	"Speed Metal Symphony"	Friedman, Becker	9:32
Total length:			45:07

== Personnel ==
Cacophony

- Peter Marrino – vocals
- Marty Friedman – lead and rhythm guitars, bass, producer
- Jason Becker – lead and rhythm guitars
- Atma Anur – drums

Production

- Steve Fontano – engineer
- Dino Alden – assistant engineer
- George Horn – mastering at Fantasy Studios, Berkeley, California
- Mike Varney – executive producer
