= Jason Becker: Not Dead Yet =

- Film poster
- Directed by: Jesse Vile
- Produced by: Jesse Vile
- Starring: Jason Becker; Gary Becker; Pat Becker; Ehren Becker; Marty Friedman; Joe Satriani; Steve Vai
- Edited by: Gideon Gold
- Music by: Jason Becker; Michael Lee Firkins
- Distributed by: Kino Lorber (US); Dogwoof Pictures (UK)
- Release dates: 3 March 2012 (Cinequest); 16 November 2012 (United Kingdom); 14 December 2012 (United States)
- Running time: 87 minutes
- Countries: United States; United Kingdom
- Language: English

Jason Becker: Not Dead Yet is a feature-length documentary film directed by Jesse Vile about guitarist Jason Becker and his 22 years living with amyotrophic lateral sclerosis.

The film includes footage from Becker's childhood and his early days with guitarist Marty Friedman and the rock band Cacophony. The film premiered at the 2012 Cinequest Film Festival, and also screened at Hot Docs, Sheffield Doc/Fest, Full Frame Documentary Film Festival and the Hamptons International Film Festival. The film's distribution rights were acquired by Dogwoof Pictures in the UK and Kino Lorber in the US, and it was released theatrically in November 2012.

== Synopsis ==
The film documents Becker's rise to near-stardom, following him from the first time he touched a guitar as a five-year-old to when he was drafted into The David Lee Roth Band as lead guitarist at the age of 19. In 1990, this was considered perhaps the most coveted rock guitar gig on the planet, as Becker would be following in the footsteps of acclaimed guitarists Eddie van Halen and Steve Vai, both of whom played with David Lee Roth as lead guitar player. It was shortly after that Becker was diagnosed with amyotrophic lateral sclerosis, more popularly known as Lou Gehrig's disease, and given just 3 to 5 years to live. Becker was able to finish the recording of Roth's third full-length studio album A Little Ain't Enough but was unable to make the tour due to his physical decline.

Despite his diagnosis, Becker continued to write music even after losing all the ability to move and speak. Becker would go on to write and record two full-length studio albums Perspective (1996) and Collection (2008). Becker communicates exclusively via an eye pattern chart invented by his father, artist and poet, Gary Becker.

Although the film examines Becker's physical decline and his missed shot at rock superstardom, the film is a positive account of Becker's strength and survival for the past 22 years of his life.

The film makes extensive use of Becker's family archives through photographs, Super 8mm film and VHS footage. The film features interviews with Becker's family and friends as well as notable guitarists Joe Satriani and Steve Vai.

== Critical reception ==
Jason Becker: Not Dead Yet opened to general acclaim from critics. On the review aggregator Rotten Tomatoes, it holds an approval rating of 83%, based on 24 reviews with an average score of 7.17/10. At Metacritic, which assigns a weighted average rating out of 100 reviews from mainstream critics, the film received an average score of 70%, considered to be "generally favorable reviews".

The film was a New York Times Critics' Pick with Neil Genzlinger stating "This heartfelt documentary is also, more subtly, a tribute to the squadron of caregivers that has enabled Mr. Becker not only to survive for an extraordinarily long time but also to continue to compose music, using virtually the only part of him that still moves, his eyes."

Empire gave the film four stars saying "Air Guitar World, Anvil! and It Might Get Loud set the bar pretty high for guitar-based documentaries, but when the phrase "triumph of the human spirit" seems inadequate, you know you’re onto something special. The delicately-named Jesse Vile’s crowd-funded film tells the jaw-dropping-slash-heart-breaking story of the genius guitar player who came this close to succeeding Eddie Van Halen and Steve Vai in David Lee Roth’s band, only to be struck down in his prime by the degenerative nerve condition ALS, aka Lou Gehrig’s disease."

David Parkinson of Radio Times gave the film four stars saying the film "Rivals Julian Schnabel's 2007 film The Diving-Bell and the Butterfly in its portrayal of human courage and fortitude." Henry Fitzherbert of The Daily Express called the film "A moving, funny and uplifting documentary about a one-time guitar prodigy, Jason Becker, struck down a horrendous degenerative disease."

Drew Hunt of Slant Magazine said, "Jesse Vile's film, despite its best intentions, is merely a serviceable extension of his own fandom."

== Accolades ==
- Grierson Award for Best Newcomer (Jesse Vile) [Nominated]
- Special Jury Prize (Hamptons International Film Festival) [Won]
- Outstanding Achievement in Filmmaking (Newport Beach Film Festival) [Won]
- Grand Jury Prize presented by Leonard Maltin (Biografilm Festival Bologna) [Won]
- Crystal Heart Award for Best Documentary Feature (Heartland Film Festival) [Won]
- Audience Award (San Francisco Documentary Film Festival) [Won]
- Audience Award (Cinequest Film Festival) [Won]
- Special Jury Prize for Documentary (Cinequest Film Festival) [Won]
- Audience Award (Calgary International Film Festival) [Won]
- Charles Guggenheim Emerging Artist Award (Jesse Vile) [Nominated]
- British Independent Film Awards (Raindance Award) [Nominated]
- Inspiration Award (Full Frame Documentary Film Festival) [Nominated]
- Golden Athena Award (Athens International Film Festival) [Nominated]
