= Collection (Jason Becker album) =

Studio album by Jason Becker
- Released: November 10, 2008
- Recorded: 1988–2008
- Genre: Rock, heavy metal, neoclassical metal, shred
- Length: 76:16
- Label: Shrapnel
- Producer: Mike Varney

Jason Becker chronology
The Blackberry Jams (2003)	Collection (2008)	Boy Meets Guitar, Vol. 1 (2012)

Professional ratings
Review scores
Source	Rating
AllMusic	4/5 stars

Collection is the fifth studio album by Jason Becker released by Shrapnel Records on November 4, 2008. The album includes three new songs in addition to some older recordings. It includes many musicians and features guitarists such as Marty Friedman, Greg Howe, Joe Satriani, Michael Lee Firkins, Steve Vai, and Steve Hunter.

== Collection ==
This album contains a mixture of remastered songs from Becker's previous projects, as well as three new songs. Even though he can no longer move and speak due to amyotrophic lateral sclerosis, he was still able to compose for the album. He explained his method in an HTML file included on the album disc.

"I used a music software program called LogicPro with a Mac computer and a synthesizer keyboard hooked up to it. My father had invented a very fast and effective communication system for me when I was losing my voice. It is a sign language that requires only eye movements and is faster than any computer. I would try to explain to my caregiver (usually my dad, mom, or my close friends) what to play on the keyboard. When they got fairly close, I would have them take me into LogicPro where I could edit every part of every note. After composing in this way I got together with my friend and co-producer, Dan Alvarez. We worked on arrangements and sounds to make it better. Then we got musician friends to add their talents to the mix."

In addition to 13 tracks, the disc also includes bonus features that are playable on a computer. These features include demo versions of Becker's piece End of the Beginning recorded while he could still barely play, as well as a demo of Go Off! from Cacophony and a recording of Becker "noodling" on guitar.

== Track listing ==
All tracks are written by Jason Becker, except where noted.

No.	Title	Writer(s)	Length
1.	"Rain"		3:12
2.	"River of Longing"		5:54
3.	"Images"		3:45
4.	"Opus Pocus"		5:39
5.	"Higher"		5:26
6.	"It's Showtime!"	David Lee Roth, Becker	3:47
7.	"Altitudes"		5:41
8.	"End of the Beginning"		11:45
9.	"River of Longing (Reprise)"	Dan Alvarez	4:16
10.	"Meet Me in the Morning"	Bob Dylan	5:24
11.	"Air"		5:39
12.	"Electric Prayer for Peace"		11:50
13.	"Mandy's Throbbing Little Heart"		1:22
Total length:			70:55

== Musicians ==
- Jason Becker - Guitar, Producer, Mixing
- Dan Alvarez - Organ, Piano, Arranger, Keyboards, Choir, Chorus, Synclavier, Drum Programming, Keyboard Arrangements
- Caren Anderson - Soprano
- Atma Anur - Drums
- Jennie Bemesderfer - Alto
- Mike Bemesderfer - Flute, Throat Singing
- Gregg Bissonette - Percussion, Drums
- Matt Bissonette - Bass, Vocals
- Joey Blake - Vocals
- Deen Castronovo - Drums
- Bryan Dyer - Choir, Chorus
- Cathy Ellis - Soprano
- Michael Lee Firkins - Dobro, Guitar
- Marty Friedman - Guitar
- Steve Hunter - Guitar
- Danny Griffin - Throat Singing
- Greg Howe - Guitar
- Raz Kennedy - Vocals
- Marc LaFrance - Vocals
- Alison Lewis - Choir, Chorus
- Dave Lopez - Guitar
- Salar Nader - Tabla, Dhol
- DJ D Sharp - Beats
- Jimmy O'Shea - Bass
- Melanie Rath - Vocals
- Steve Rosenthal - Cymbals
- David Lee Roth - Vocals
- Joe Satriani - Guitar
- Anisha Thomas - Soprano
- Brett Tuggle - Keyboards, Vocals
- Steve Vai - Guitar

== Production ==
- Mike Varney - Executive producer
- Ashley Moore - Mastering
- Jason Becker - Producer, Mixing
- Dan Alvarez - Producer, Mixing
- Mike Bemesderfer - Producer, Editing, Mixing
- Matt Bissonette - Bass, Vocals, Producer
- Steve Fontano - Producer
- Marty Friedman - Producer
- Greg Howe - Producer
- John Lowry - Engineer
- Bob Rock - Producer, Mixing

== Personnel ==
- Gary Becker - Cover Painting
- Mark Leialoha - Photography
- Tony Masterantonio - Graphic Design
- Ross Pelton - Photography
- Dave Stephens - Graphic Design
