= Perpetual Burn =

Studio album by Jason Becker
- Released: August 1988
- Recorded: 1988
- Studio: Prairie Sun Recording Studios in Cotati, California
- Genres: Neoclassical metal, instrumental rock
- Length: 42:01
- Label: Shrapnel
- Producers: Jason Becker, Marty Friedman, Steve Fontano, Mike Varney

Jason Becker chronology
Perpetual Burn (1988)	Perspective (1996)

Professional ratings
Review scores
Source	Rating
AllMusic	4/5 stars
Collector's Guide to Heavy Metal	6/10
Kerrang!	2.5/5 stars
Rock Hard	7.0/10

Perpetual Burn is the first studio album by the American guitarist Jason Becker. It was released in 1988 through Shrapnel Records (United States) and Roadrunner Records (Europe).

The album was released at around the same time as Dragon's Kiss, the first album by his fellow Cacophony guitarist Marty Friedman, who also co-produced and performed on Perpetual Burn.

This is the only solo album Becker released before his diagnosis with ALS in 1989.

== Music ==
The track "Air" is played almost entirely with clean guitar tones. The track makes use of fingerpicking and counterpoint. It has drawn comparisons to Bach.

== Track listing ==
All music is composed by Jason Becker, except where noted.

Side one
No.	Title	Length
1.	"Altitudes"	5:40
2.	"Perpetual Burn"	3:30
3.	"Mabel's Fatal Fable"	4:52
4.	"Air"	5:39

Side two
No.	Title	Length
5.	"Temple of the Absurd" (Becker, Marty Friedman)	4:42
6.	"Eleven Blue Egyptians" (Becker, Friedman)	5:44
7.	"Dweller in the Cellar"	6:15
8.	"Opus Pocus"	5:39
Total length:		42:01

== Personnel ==
Musicians

- Jason Becker – lead and rhythm guitars, bass guitar, keyboards, producer
- Marty Friedman – additional guitar solos (tracks 5–7), co-producer
- Atma Anur – drums

Production

- Steve Fontano – co-producer, engineer, mixing
- Joe Marquez – assistant engineer
- George Horn – mastering at Fantasy Studios, Berkeley, California
- Mike Varney – executive producer
