= Richie Kotzen (album) =

Studio album by Richie Kotzen
- Released: August 11, 1989
- Recorded: Prairie Sun Recording Studios in Cotati, California
- Genre: Instrumental rock
- Length: 40:12
- Label: Shrapnel
- Producer: Jason Becker, Mike Varney

Richie Kotzen chronology
Richie Kotzen (1989)	Fever Dream (1990)

Professional ratings
Review scores
Source	Rating
AllMusic	3/5 stars
Collector's Guide to Heavy Metal	4/10
Rock Hard	5.0/10

Richie Kotzen is the self-titled first studio album by the American guitarist Richie Kotzen, released on August 11, 1989, through Shrapnel Records.

== Track listing ==
All music is composed by Richie Kotzen.

No.	Title	Length
1.	"Squeeze Play"	4:38
2.	"Strut It"	4:10
3.	"Unsafe at Any Speed"	3:15
4.	"Rat Trap"	4:31
5.	"Cryptic Script"	3:57
6.	"Plaid Plesiosaur"	4:16
7.	"Spider Legs"	5:50
8.	"Jocose Jenny"	4:31
9.	"Noblesse Oblige"	5:04
Total length:		40:12

== Personnel ==
Musicians

- Richie Kotzen – guitar, keyboards
- Stuart Hamm – bass
- Steve Smith – drums

Production

- Jason Becker, Mike Varney – producers
- Tori Swenson – engineer, mixing
- Joe Marquez, Marc Reyburn - assistant engineers
- Mark Rennick – mixing assistant
- George Horn – mastering at Fantasy Studios, Berkeley, California
