= The Blackberry Jams =

Compilation album by Jason Becker
- Released: March 11, 2003
- Recorded: 1987–1988
- Genre: Instrumental rock, heavy metal
- Length: 68:22
- Label: Shrapnel

Jason Becker chronology
The Raspberry Jams (1999)	The Blackberry Jams (2003)	Collection (2008)

Professional ratings
Review scores
Source	Rating
Allmusic	2.5/5 stars

The Blackberry Jams is the fourth studio album by Jason Becker. It is a collection of private recordings made by Becker between 1987 and 1988.

== Track listing ==
All songs written by Jason Becker except where noted

No.	Title	Writer(s)	Length
1.	"Go Off! Intro"		0:56
2.	"Groin-Grabbingly Transcendent"		1:48
3.	"Opitudes"		5:32
4.	"Church of the Weird"		4:01
5.	"Mabel's Air...Could It Be Any Faster?"		4:15
6.	"Short X-Ray Eyes""		0:50
7.	"Airage"		1:29
8.	"Perpetual Burn"		3:26
9.	"Ashram of You, Lee"		3:17
10.	"Images Intro"		0:21
11.	"Mabel...Simple Little Nibbling"		2:12
12.	"Jewel"	Jason Becker, Marty Friedman	1:44
13.	"Kind of Like a Spring"		0:56
14.	"Air"		2:48
15.	"Ten Yellow Pointy Kitties"	Jason Becker, Marty Friedman	2:42
16.	"Absurd Temple Jig"		1:04
17.	"Part of Stranger"		0:48
18.	"There's That"		1:33
19.	"Black Cat"	Jason Becker, Marty Friedman	4:14
20.	"Little Rippage"		0:35
21.	"Perpetual Tides"		4:50
22.	"Floor Pie"		1:06
23.	"El Beckero"		1:04
24.	"Pocus I Say"		1:38
25.	"Conglomeration...Boy Meets Guitar"		5:10
26.	"Little Dweller"		1:00
27.	"Jewel #2"	Jason Becker, Marty Friedman	2:49
28.	"Long X-Ray Eyes"		4:58
29.	"Altitudes Jam"		2:50
30.	"Bemesderfer's Wooping Stick"	Mike Bemesderfer	1:14
31.	"If It Weren't So Purdy I'd Call It Skin Flute"	Mike Bemesderfer	2:31
Total length:			73:41

== Musicians ==
- Jason Becker - Composer, Multi-Instruments
- Marty Friedman - Guitar, Keyboards

=== Production ===
- Mike Bemesderfer - Digital Mastering, Digital Restoration, Flute, Wind Controller
- Mike Varney - Executive Producer
- George Bellas - Booklet Design
- Gary Becker - Cover Art, Lettering, Photography
- Robert Becker - Photography
- Pat Johnson - Photography
- Ross Pelton - Photography
