= Introduction (Marty Friedman album) =

Studio album by Marty Friedman
- Released: November 8, 1994
- Recorded: November–December 1993
- Studio: Total Access Recording in Redondo Beach, California; Alex Wilkinson's studio in Shadow Hills, Los Angeles
- Genre: Instrumental rock, ambient
- Length: 42:04
- Label: Shrapnel
- Producer: Marty Friedman, Steve Fontano, Alex Wilkinson, Mike Varney

Marty Friedman chronology
Scenes (1992)	Introduction (1994)	True Obsessions (1996)

Introduction is the third studio album by guitarist Marty Friedman. It was released on November 8, 1994, through Shrapnel Records in the United States and Roadrunner Records in Europe. It is Friedman's second album to feature Nick Menza on drums; both Friedman and Menza were members of Megadeth at the time. Additionally, Nick's father Don Menza plays shakuhachi on the album. Introduction was released just one week after the Megadeth album Youthanasia.

== Critical reception ==
Professional ratings
Review scores
Source	Rating
AllMusic	4.5/5 stars

Robert Taylor at AllMusic gave Introduction 4.5 stars out of 5, calling it "An unexpected masterpiece in a genre that could use more releases such as this." The album was described as having built on the formula set out in Friedman's previous album, Scenes (1992), but "with more maturity and musical diversity. Themes are not just introduced and abandoned in favor of gratuitous technical noodling, rather the compositions are thoughtfully explored and brought to a natural conclusion."

== Track listing ==
All tracks are written by Marty Friedman.

No.	Title	Length
1.	"Arrival"	4:52
2.	"Bittersweet"	5:27
3.	"Be"	4:51
4.	"Escapism"	9:14
5.	"Luna"	5:17
6.	"Mama"	3:55
7.	"Loneliness"	4:08
8.	"Siberia"	4:20
Total length:		42:04

== Personnel ==
- Marty Friedman – guitar, bass, arrangement, production
- Brian BecVar – keyboard, piano, additional sound replacement
- Nick Menza – drums
- Alex Wilkinson – additional orchestration
- Sachi McHenry – cello
- Charlie Bisharat – violin
- Don Menza – shakuhachi
- Steve Fontano – engineering
- Alex Wilkinson – engineering, production
- Jared Johnson – engineering
- Seth Cooperrider – engineering
- Kenneth K. Lee, Jr. – mastering
- Mike Varney – executive production
