= The Raspberry Jams =

Album by Jason Becker

Compilation album by Jason Becker
- Released: October 19, 1999
- Genre: Instrumental rock, heavy metal
- Length: 61:02
- Label: Shrapnel
- Producer: Jason Becker

Jason Becker chronology
Perspective (1996)	The Raspberry Jams (1999)	The Blackberry Jams (2003)

Professional ratings
Review scores
Source	Rating
Allmusic	3.5/5 stars

The Raspberry Jams: A Collection Of Demos, Songs, And Ideas On Guitar is the third studio album by Jason Becker, released on October 19, 1999.

== Track listing ==
All songs written by Jason Becker except where noted:

No.	Title	Writer(s)	Length
1.	"Becker-Ola"		3:50
2.	"Mandy's Throbbing Little Heart"		1:22
3.	"Amma"		0:46
4.	"When You Wish Upon a Star"		1:54
5.	"Jasin Street"		4:08
6.	"Beatle Grubs"		2:41
7.	"Grilled Peeps"		1:20
8.	"If You Have to Shoot...Shoot-Don't Talk"		5:03
9.	"Purple Chewable Fern"		2:37
10.	"Black Stallion Jam"	Jason Becker, Marty Friedman	3:15
11.	"Amarnath"		0:36
12.	"Angel Eyes"		3:12
13.	"Throat Hole"		1:50
14.	"Dang Sea of Samsara"		4:24
15.	"Urmila"		2:11
16.	"Thousand Million Suns"		5:27
17.	"Clean Solo"		3:05
18.	"Too Fast, No Good for You!"		0:45
19.	"Sweet Baboon"		1:36
20.	"Shock Tea"		1:07
21.	"Ghost to the Post"		4:37
22.	"Blood on the Traches"		2:11
23.	"Oddly Enough"		2:07
24.	"Crush"		0:26
25.	"Vocal Silliness"		0:34
Total length:			61:02

== See also ==
- Cacophony
