= Scenes (album) =

Studio album by Marty Friedman
- Released: November 17, 1992
- Studio: Goodnight L.A.B. in Panorama City, Los Angeles; Kitarō's home studio in Ward, Colorado; Devonshire Studios in North Hollywood, Los Angeles
- Genre: Instrumental rock, ambient
- Length: 40:00
- Label: Shrapnel
- Producer: Marty Friedman, Kitarō, Steve Fontano

Marty Friedman chronology
Dragon's Kiss (1988)	Scenes (1992)	Introduction (1994)

Scenes is the second studio album by guitarist Marty Friedman, released on November 17, 1992 through Shrapnel Records (United States) and Roadrunner Records (Europe). It is a notable stylistic departure from Friedman's first album, Dragon's Kiss (1988), as well as his heavier work with Cacophony and Megadeth, in that it predominantly features mellow, clean-tone playing instead of his usual distortion. The final track, "Triumph", is a remake of "Thunder March" from Dragon's Kiss. The album also features then-Megadeth bandmate Nick Menza on drums.

== Critical reception ==
Professional ratings
Review scores
Source	Rating
AllMusic	3/5 stars

Robert Taylor at AllMusic gave Scenes three stars out of five, saying that "This recording marked the true arrival of one of the most important and original guitarists to emerge from the neo-classical genre", and that it "revealed a level of depth and maturity that equally surprised Megadeth and guitar-shred fans everywhere." In addition to Friedman's work, the production by Kitarō and keyboards by Brian BecVar were also heavily praised.

== Track listing ==
All tracks are written by Marty Friedman.

No.	Title	Length
1.	"Tibet"	2:35
2.	"Angel"	3:39
3.	"Valley of Eternity"	8:14
4.	"Night"	6:39
5.	"Realm of the Senses"	5:32
6.	"West"	5:44
7.	"Trance"	1:56
8.	"Triumph"	5:41
Total length:		40:00

== Personnel ==
- Marty Friedman – guitar, bass, production
- Brian BecVar – keyboard, percussion
- Nick Menza – drums
- Steve Fontano – engineering, mixing, production
- Kitarō – engineering, mixing, production
- Mike Stock – engineering
- Dary Sulich – engineering
- Sir John – engineering
- Gordon Sutcliffe – engineering
- Kenneth K. Lee, Jr. – mastering
