= Loud, Wild and Heavy =

EP by Hawaii
- Released: 1984
- Recorded: 1984
- Genre: Speed metal
- Length: 18:22
- Label: Cavern Productions
- Producer: Hawaii

Hawaii chronology
One Nation Underground (1983)	Loud, Wild and Heavy (1984)	The Natives Are Restless (1985)

Professional ratings
Review scores
Source	Rating
AllMusic	2.5/5 stars
Collector's Guide to Heavy Metal	7/10

Loud, Wild and Heavy is the sophomore release by the United States speed metal band Hawaii.

Bassist/vocalist Gary St. Pierre, who featured on the One Nation Underground debut LP, was replaced by bassist Joey Galisa and vocalist Eddie Day. Galisa had previously played with Honolulu's Rat Attack while Day was a former member of Marty Friedman's old Maryland-based band Deuce.

"Escape the Night" had previously been recorded by Marty Friedman's pre-Hawaii outfit Vixen for their 1983 Made in Hawaii EP and was re-cut by Hawaii for One Nation Underground.

Loud, Wild & Heavy was officially re-issued on CD in 2018 by Greek label No Remorse Records as part of a series of early Marty Friedman works.

== Track listing ==
No.	Title	Length
1.	"Bad Boys of Metal"	3:34
2.	"Loud, Wild and Heavy"	5:36
3.	"Escape the Night"	4:02
4.	"Rhapsody in Black"	7:04

== Personnel ==
Hawaii

- Eddie Day - lead vocals
- Marty Friedman - guitars, backing vocals
- Joey Galisa - bass guitar, backing vocals
- Jeff Graves - drums

Production

- Jim Linkner - engineer
