= The Natives Are Restless =

- Original US cover

Studio album by Hawaii
- Released: 1985
- Recorded: March–April 1985
- Studio: Rendez-Vous Recording, Honolulu, Hawaii
- Genre: Speed metal
- Length: 38:32
- Label: Shockwaves (US); Axe Killer (France); SPV/Steamhammer (Germany)
- Producer: Hawaii, Darryl Amaki, Harris Okuda

Hawaii chronology
Loud, Wild and Heavy (1984)	The Natives Are Restless (1985)

Professional ratings
Review scores
Source	Rating
AllMusic	3/5 stars
Collector's Guide to Heavy Metal	7/10

The Natives Are Restless is the third and last studio release by the American speed metal band Hawaii and the only one to feature guitarist Tom Azevedo, formerly of Honolulu band Rat Attack.

It is also the band's only album to see an official overseas release, with France's Axe Killer Records and Germany's SPV/Steamhammer both issuing the record in Europe, using individual cover artwork. SPV would re-issue the album on CD in 1988; Axe Killer followed in 1997 and again in 2007.

The song "Beg for Mercy" was originally recorded by Marty Friedman with his previous band Vixen for their 1983 Made In Hawaii EP.

== Track listing ==
Side one
No.	Title	Lyrics	Music	Length
1.	"Call of the Wild"	Marty Friedman, Eddie Day	Friedman, Jeff Graves, Joey Galisa	3:52
2.	"Turn It Louder"	Friedman	Friedman	4:30
3.	"V.P.H.B"	Day	Friedman, Day, Graves	4:07
4.	"Beg for Mercy"	Day	Friedman, Day, Graves, Galisa	5:07

Side two
No.	Title	Lyrics	Music	Length
5.	"Unfinished Business"	Friedman, Day	Friedman, Day	4:30
6.	"Proud to Be Loud"	Friedman, Day	Friedman, Day, Graves	4:05
7.	"Lies"	Day	Friedman	3:30
8.	"Omichan No Uta" (instrumental)		Friedman	3:33
9.	"Dynamite"	Day	Friedman, Graves	4:45

== Personnel ==
Hawaii

- Eddie Day – lead vocals
- Marty Friedman – lead guitar, backing vocals
- Tom Azevedo – rhythm guitar
- Joey Galisa – bass guitar
- Jeff Graves – drums, backing vocals

Production

- Pierre Grill - engineer, mixing
- Darryl Amaki, Harris Okuda - executive producers
