= Dr. A =

Dr. A is a pseudonym used by the following people:

- Isaac Asimov, in The Sensuous Dirty Old Man (1971)
- Marty Friedman, under the band Red Dye #2 from 2000 to 2001
