= Fifth Angel (album) =

- Cover art by Guy Aitchison

Studio album by Fifth Angel
- Released: September 1986
- Recorded: October 1984, 1985
- Studio: Steve Lawson Productions, Seattle, Washington
- Genre: Heavy metal; power metal
- Length: 37:39
- Label: Shrapnel
- Producer: Terry Date, Fifth Angel

Fifth Angel chronology
Fifth Angel (1986)	Time Will Tell (1989)

Professional ratings
Review scores
Source	Rating
AllMusic	4/5 stars
Collector's Guide to Heavy Metal	10/10

Fifth Angel is the first studio album by the American heavy metal band Fifth Angel. It was originally released in 1986. Musically, it shows much more resemblance to modern power metal than their other albums. After recording a four song demo in late 1983 and early 1984, which they sent to over 100 record labels, Mike Varney of Shrapnel Records signed the band and financed the recording of five additional songs and released the album in 1986. Epic Records re-released it in 1988 with new artwork.

The record was produced by Fifth Angel and Terry Date.

== Track listing ==
All songs written by Ed Archer, James Byrd and Ted Pilot except "Only the Strong Survive" by Archer, Byrd, Ken Mary and Pilot

Side one
No.	Title	Length
1.	"In the Fallout"	3:55
2.	"Shout It Out"	4:27
3.	"Call Out the Warning"	3:34
4.	"Fifth Angel"	4:04
5.	"Wings of Destiny"	4:34

Side two
No.	Title	Length
6.	"The Night"	4:45
7.	"Only the Strong Survive"	3:48
8.	"Cry Out the Fools"	4:23
9.	"Fade to Flames"	4:04
Total length:		37:39

== Personnel ==
Band Members

- Ted Pilot – lead vocals
- James Byrd – lead guitar, vocals
- Ed Archer – rhythm guitar, bass (uncredited) and vocals
- Ken Mary – drums, vocals
- Randy Hansen – bass (uncredited)
- Kenny Kay – bass (credited on original release, but does not play on the record)

Production

- Produced by Terry Date & Fifth Angel
- Recorded and mixed at Steve Lawson Productions
- Terry Date – engineer, mixing
- Mastered at Fantasy Studios
- George Horn – mastering
- Maarten De Boer – mastering
- Guy Aitchison – cover art
- Ed Archer – cover concept

== Charts ==
Chart (1986)	Peak position
The Billboard 200	117
