= True Obsessions =

Studio album by Marty Friedman
- Released: April 17, 1996
- Recorded: November 6, 1995 – February 14, 1996
- Studio: Far Planet Studios, Van Nuys, Los Angeles; Jai Winding Studios, Santa Monica, California; Vintage Recorders, Phoenix, Arizona; Wilkinson Productions; Sun Valley, Los Angeles
- Genre: Instrumental rock, hard rock
- Length: 49:40
- Label: Toshiba EMI
- Producer: Marty Friedman, Steve Fontano

Marty Friedman chronology
Introduction (1994)	True Obsessions (1996)	Music for Speeding (2003)

Professional ratings
Review scores
Source	Rating
AllMusic	2.5/5 stars

True Obsessions is the fourth studio album by guitarist Marty Friedman, released on April 17, 1996 through Toshiba EMI (Japan) and October 8, 1996 through Shrapnel Records (United States). It was also the last to feature Nick Menza on drums.

== Track listing ==
All tracks are written by Marty Friedman except where noted.

No.	Title	Length
1.	"Rock Box"	2:38
2.	"Espionage"	4:30
3.	"Last September" (Steve Fontano, Friedman, Stanley Rose)	4:22
4.	"Intoxicated"	5:56
5.	"Shine on Me"	3:53
6.	"Hands of Time"	4:13
7.	"Rio"	4:32
8.	"Live and Learn" (Fontano, Friedman, Rose)	4:03
9.	"Glowing Path"	6:21
10.	"The Yearning"	3:46
11.	"Farewell"	5:26
Total length:		49:40

United States edition
No.	Title	Length
1.	"Rio"	4:32
2.	"Espionage"	4:30
3.	"Last September"	4:22
4.	"Rock Box"	2:38
5.	"The Yearning"	3:46
6.	"Live and Learn"	4:03
7.	"Glowing Path"	6:21
8.	"Intoxicated"	5:56
9.	"Farewell"	5:26
10.	"Thunder March" (demo)	3:52
Total length:		45:26

== Personnel ==
- Marty Friedman – guitar, synthesizer, production
- Stanley Rose – vocals
- Brian BecVar – keyboard, piano
- Nick Menza – drums
- Greg Bissonette – drums ("Last September", "Intoxicated", "Hands of Time")
- Carmine Appice – drums ("Shine on Me", "Live and Learn)"
- Tony Franklin – bass
- Jimmy Haslip – bass ("Intoxicated")
- Alex Wilkinson – orchestral instrumentation, percussion
- Tom Gattis – background vocals
- Steve Fontano – engineering, mixing, production
- Zach Blackstone – mixing
- Mike Tacci – mixing
- Ryan Dorn – engineering
- Brian Kinkel – engineering
- Billy Moss – engineering
- Larry Jacobson – engineering
- Wally Traugott – mastering
