= Triumphant Hearts =

Studio album by Jason Becker
- Released: December 7, 2018
- Recorded: 2018
- Genre: Instrumental, instrumental rock, progressive rock
- Length: 77:39
- Label: Music Theories / Mascot Label Records

Jason Becker chronology
Boy Meets Guitar, Vol. 1 (2012)	Triumphant Hearts (2018)

Professional ratings
Review scores
Source	Rating
Blabbermouth.net	10/10 stars
Sonic Perspectives	9.3/10 stars

Triumphant Hearts is the sixth studio album by American musician Jason Becker. Though paralyzed by amyotrophic lateral sclerosis, Becker is able to compose new material with a computer-assisted system. In October 2016, Becker launched a campaign to fund the album, which was initially estimated for release in July 2017. The campaign raised more than $100,000. The album was released on December 7, 2018.

The album has many guest appearances, including guitarists Marty Friedman, Joe Satriani, Jeff Loomis, Richie Kotzen, Gus G., Greg Howe, Steve Morse, Paul Gilbert and Steve Vai.

== Track listing ==
1. "Triumphant Heart" (feat. Marty Friedman, Glauco Bertagnin & Hiyori Okuda) - 4:08
2. "Hold On To Love" (feat. Codany Holiday) - 7:26
3. "Fantasy Weaver" (feat. Jake Shimabukuro) - 5:07
4. "Once Upon A Melody" - 6:45
5. "We Are One" (feat. Steve Knight) - 5:50
6. "Magic Woman" (feat. Uli Jon Roth & Chris Broderick) - 7:07
7. "Blowin’ in the Wind" (Gary Rosenberg & Jason Becker) - 4:57
8. "River of Longing" (feat. Joe Satriani, Aleks Sever, Guthrie Govan, Steve Morse) 5:49
9. "Valley of Fire" (feat. Michael Lee Firkins, Steve Vai, Joe Bonamassa, Paul Gilbert, Neal Schon, Mattias IA Eklundh, Marty Friedman, Greg Howe, Jeff Loomis, Richie Kotzen, Gus G., Steve Hunter, Ben Woods) - 9:04
10. "River of Longing" (feat. Trevor Rabin) - 5:53
11. "Taking Me Back" - 4:23
12. "Tell Me No Lies" - 4:20
13. "Hold On To Love" (feat. Codany Holiday) [Chuck Zwicky Remix] - 5:56
14. "You Do It" - 0:54
