= Rock Fujiyama =

- Rock Fujiyama logo
- Starring: Marty Friedman; Kenny Guy; Shelly; Rolly
- Ending theme: "Elixir" by Marty Friedman "Fujiyama de ai masho u" by Rock Fujiyama Band
- Country of origin: Japan
- No. of episodes: 51

Production
- Running time: 24 minutes

Original release
- Network: TV Tokyo
- Release: April 3, 2006 – March 26, 2007

Rock Fujiyama (Japanese: ロックフジヤマ, Hepburn: Rokku Fujiyama) is a Japanese music variety television show that was broadcast by TV Tokyo from April 3, 2006, to March 26, 2007. It is the substantial remake of Heavymeta-san that was broadcast in 2005 in Japan. Despite the title, the key genre in the program is heavy metal, just like Heavymeta-san.

In June 2020, "Rock Fujiyama" official YouTube channel was established.

== List of guests ==
- #01 - Kohei Otomo
- #02 - Hideki Saijo
- #03 - Masaki Kyomoto
- #04 - Kenji Ohtsuki
- #05 - Yoshio Nomura
- #06 - Nanase Aikawa
- #07 - Takanori Takeyama
- #08 - Shinya
- #09 - Shirō Sano
- #10 - Noriko Aota
- #11 - MCU
- #12 - Takahiro Azuma
- #13 - Kaela Kimura
- #14 - Andrew W.K.
- #15 - Takashi Utsunomiya, Jake Shimabukuro
- #16 - Hiroshi "Mush" Kamayatsu, DragonForce
- #17 - Genki Sudo
- #18 - Demon Kogure
- #19 - Masahiro Takashima, Luke Takamura
- #20 - Kone, Luke Takamura
- #21 - Kankuro Kudo
- #22 - Kohei Otomo
- #23 - Football Hour
- #24 - Paul Gilbert
- #25 - Beni Arashiro
- #26 - Takako Shirai, Hajime Anzai
- #27 - Koji Yamamoto
- #28 - Maki Oguro
- #29 - Haruo Chikada
- #30 - Jun Miura, Hajime Anzai
- #31 - Kerry King
- #32 - Kenji Ohtsuki
- #33 - Nanase Aikawa, Shinya
- #34 - Masahiro Takashima
- #35 - Toru Hidaka, Taro Kato (Beat Crusaders)
- #36 - Shiro Sano
- #37 - Yoshio Nomura, Luke Takamura
- #38 - The Collectors
- #39 - George Takahashi
- #40 - Mika Mifune
- #41 - Makoto Ayukawa
- #42 - Starless Takashima
- #43 - Ayako Nakanomori
- #44 - Rize
- #45 - Polysics
- #46 - Triceratops
- #47 - Paul Gilbert, Eu Phoria
- #48 - B-Dash
- #49 - Dohatsuten
- #50 - Ken Yokoyama
- #51 - Triceratops, Luke Takamura
- #52 - Herman Li, Sam Totman (DragonForce)
