= Jackson Kelly =

Jackson Kelly may refer to:

- Jackson Kelly (law firm), a full service law firm headquartered in the United States
- Jackson Kelly (guitar), a heavily modified version of the Gibson Explorer produced by Jackson Guitars
- Jackson Kelly Star, a radically shaped solid body electric guitar produced by Jackson Guitars
