= Hawaii (band) =

American heavy metal band

- Origin: Honolulu, Hawaii, U.S.
- Genres: Heavy metal, speed metal
- Years active: 1981–1985
- Past members: Eddie Day; Marty Friedman; Tom Azevedo; Jeff Graves; Joey Galisa

Hawaii was an American heavy metal band formed in 1981 by former Deuce guitarist Marty Friedman, originally called Vixen (not to be confused with the 1980s female band of the same name). Vixen recorded several demos and appeared on the U.S. Metal Vol. II (1982) compilation album, before releasing the Made In Hawaii EP in 1983. Another early recording appeared on Metal Massacre II (1982) under the name Aloha, with Lisa Ruiz taking over lead vocals from Kim La Chance.

After Hawaii split up, Marty Friedman formed the band Cacophony with Jason Becker; bassist/vocalist Gary St. Pierre joined Vicious Rumors as lead vocalist on their 1985 debut album Soldiers of the Night.

Vixen vocalist Kim La Chance surfaced with Malisha and Serve Your Savage Beast in 1986. She was also the executive producer behind the Vixen – The Works (2003) demo compilation CD release, including "Angels from the Dust" from Shrapnel Records' U.S. Metal Vol. II.

== Band members ==
- Eddie Day – vocals
- Gary St. Pierre – bass, vocals on One Nation Underground
- Marty Friedman – lead guitar
- Tom Azevedo – rhythm guitar
- Joey Galisa – bass
- Jeff Graves – drums
- Bob Shade- drums/ backing vocals
- Kim La Chance – vocals on Made In Hawaii
- Kimo – bass on Made In Hawaii

== Discography ==
- Made in Hawaii (EP) (as Vixen) (1983)
- One Nation Underground (1983)
- Loud, Wild and Heavy (EP) (1984)
- The Natives Are Restless (1985)
- The Works (as Vixen) (2003)
