= One Nation Underground =

One Nation Underground may refer to:

- One Nation Underground (Pearls Before Swine album) (1967)
- One Nation Underground (Hawaii album) (1983)
- One Nation Underground (Ill Niño album) (2005)
