= Go Off! =

Studio album by Cacophony
- Released: January 1989
- Studios: Studio D Recording, Sausalito; Fantasy Studios, Berkeley; Prairie Sun Recording Studios, Cotati
- Genres: Heavy metal; neoclassical metal
- Length: 40:13
- Label: Shrapnel
- Producers: Steve Fontano; Marty Friedman; Jason Becker; Mike Varney

Cacophony chronology
Speed Metal Symphony (1987)	Go Off! (1989)

Go Off! is the second and final studio album by heavy metal band Cacophony, released in January 1989 through Shrapnel Records. About two years after the album's release, guitarist Jason Becker was diagnosed with ALS, which eventually led to his near-total paralysis. Also two years later, guitarist Marty Friedman joined the band Megadeth. The album was re-released on CD in 1991.

== Critical reception ==
Professional ratings
Review scores
Source	Rating
AllMusic	2.5/5 stars
Collector's Guide to Heavy Metal	8/10
Rock Hard	7.5/10

In a contemporary review, Wolfgang Schäfer of Rock Hard was not overly impressed by the album but remarked how Friedman and Becker refrained "from superfluous solo escapades", making the music more accessible and fueling the suspicion that Mike Varney wanted "to repeat the success of the dissolved Racer X with this band."

Andy Hinds at AllMusic found Go Off! an improvement on their 1987 debut album Speed Metal Symphony and compared the "slightly more song-oriented approach" to contemporaries Racer X. He praised Friedman and Becker's technical craft as "a very interesting listen at times" and that "there are even some beautiful moments, like the outro of the title track", while also noting an element of restraint in their playing compared to Speed Metal Symphony. However, much criticism was directed at singer Peter Marrino, with Hinds lambasting his vocals as "annoying" and the lyrics "ridiculous".

Martin Popoff reviewed positively the album and considered it "too crazy, professional and intense for its day", becoming "a cult classic" and "a mid-years progressive metal cornerstone." He was also critical of Marrino's vocals, but praised Deen Castronovo's performance as "possibly his chopsiest of a long career."

== Track listing ==
Side one
No.	Title	Writer(s)	Length
1.	"X-Ray Eyes"	Marty Friedman, Jason Becker	5:10
2.	"E.S.P"	Friedman	6:06
3.	"Stranger"	Becker, Steve Fontano	3:24
4.	"Go Off!"	Friedman, Becker	3:46

Side two
No.	Title	Writer(s)	Length
5.	"Black Cat"	Friedman, Becker	7:45
6.	"Sword of the Warrior"	Friedman, Fontano	5:09
7.	"Floating World"	Friedman	5:10
8.	"Images"	Becker	3:43
Total length:			40:13

== Personnel ==
Cacophony

- Peter Marrino – vocals
- Marty Friedman – guitar, producer
- Jason Becker – guitar, producer
- Jimmy O'Shea – bass
- Kenny Stavropoulos – drums (credited but does not play on the album)
- Deen Castronovo – drums

Production

- Steve Fontano – producer, engineer
- Joe Marquez, Scott Tatter, Michael Rosen – engineers
- Dino Alden, Marc Reyburn – assistant engineers
- George Horn – mastering at Fantasy Studios, Berkeley, California
- Mike Varney – executive producer
