= Warmth in the Wilderness: A Tribute to Jason Becker =

Studio album by Various Artists
- Released: October 2, 2001
- Genre: Hard rock
- Length: 155:47
- Label: Lion Music
- Producer: Mattias Eklundh, Torben Enevoldsen, Ron Keel, John Pace, Jeff Scheetz

Various Artists chronology
Warmth in the Wilderness: A Tribute to Jason Becker (2001)	Warmth in the Wilderness, Vol. 2: A Tribute to Jason Becker (2002)

Professional ratings
Review scores
Source	Rating
Allmusic	3/5 stars

Warmth in the Wilderness is a tribute album to guitar virtuoso Jason Becker. It features many artists such as Paul Gilbert, Marty Friedman, Mike Campese, Anders Johansson, Lars-Eric Mattsson, Paul Nelson, Jeff Pilson and other groups as well. A second tribute album was released in 2002, with the title "Warmth in the Wilderness Vol. 2 - A Tribute to Jason Becker". Many songs were originally written by Jason Becker and David Lee Roth, before Becker was stricken with Lou Gehrig's disease.

== Track listing ==
Disc One
No.	Title	Writer(s)	Length
1.	"A Little Ain't Enough - performed by Stormwind"	Jason Becker, David Lee Roth	4:32
2.	"Altitudes - performed by Torben Enevoldsen"	Becker	5:48
3.	"Eleven Blue Egyptians - performed by Ron Keel's Iron Horse"	Jason Becker, Marty Friedman	5:51
4.	"A Jam for Jason - performed by Cosmosquad"	Jeff Kollman	10:22
5.	"Higher - performed by Dave Martone"	Becker	7:00
6.	"Alfie and Linda MacDonald of Phantom Blue-Becker Ola - performed by Puamana"	Becker	4:17
7.	"Dogtown Shuffle - performed by Rolf Munkes' Empire"	Steve Hunter, David Lee Roth, Brett Tuggle	3:50
8.	"Go Off - performed by Evolution"	Becker, Friedman	3:48
9.	"Hammerhead Shark - performed by Lars-Eric Mattsson & Mark Boals"	Eric Lowen, Roth, Preston Sturges	3:36
10.	"Jasin Street - performed by Hit the Ground Runnin'"	S. Williams	4:22
11.	"If You Have to Shoot... Shoot-Don't Talk - performed by Tony Baena"	Becker	4:50
12.	"Baby's On Fire - performed by Josephine of Phantom Blue"	Hunter, Roth, Sturges	3:26
13.	"Sensible Shoes - performed by Jeff Scheetz"	Dennis Morgan, Roth, Sturges	5:06
14.	"ESP - performed by Cyril Achard"	Becker, Friedman	5:58
15.	"Air - performed by Phi Ansari Yaan-Zek"	Becker	6:00

Disc Two
No.	Title	Writer(s)	Length
1.	"Opus Pocus 2 - performed by Project Alcazar"	Jason Becker	5:43
2.	"Mandy's Little Throbbing Heart - performed by Eric Sands"	Becker	3:33
3.	"Blue - performed by Paul Nelson"	Jason Becker	3:36
4.	"It's Showtime - performed by May Lian"	Becker, Roth	3:39
5.	"Becker's Bolero - performed by Jeff Pilson"	Becker	3:18
6.	"Lydia's House - performed by Mattias Eklundh"	Becker	3:33
7.	"Drop in the Bucket - performed by All the Usual Suspects"	Becker, David Lee Roth	5:13
8.	"Forcefield - performed by Rob Johnson"	Rob Johnson	4:15
9.	"Urmila - performed by Mistheria"	Becker	4:30
10.	"Black Stallion Jam - performed by Marty Friedman"	Becker, Friedman	3:35
11.	"Hawking - performed by Paul Gilbert"	Todd Rundgren	7:09
12.	"Primal - performed by Anders Johansson"	Becker	6:47
13.	"Rain - performed by Eric Zimmermann"	Becker	3:51
14.	"Concerto - performed by Mike Campese"	Becker, Friedman	5:00
15.	"Tell the Truth - performed by Lars-Eric Mattsson"	Steve Hunt, David Lee Roth, Brett Tuggle	6:49
16.	"Outro Jam - performed by Lars-Eric Mattsson"		6:30
Total length:			155:47
