= Fifth Angel =

American heavy metal band

- Origin: Bellevue, Washington, U.S.
- Genres: Heavy metal; power metal
- Years active: 1983–1990; 2010; 2017–present
- Labels: Epic; Shrapnel; Nuclear Blast

Fifth Angel is an American heavy metal band from Bellevue, Washington.

== Biography ==
Fifth Angel was formed in the suburbs of Seattle in 1983, specifically, in the Bellevue area. The band's initial lineup consisted of Ted Pilot (vocals), James Byrd (lead guitar), Ed Archer (rhythm guitar), Ken Mary (drums) and Kenny Kay (bass). This line up went into Steve Lawson Productions studio in late 1983 with Terry Date as producer/engineer and recorded a four-song demo that consisted of "Fade to Flames", "Fifth Angel", "In the Fallout", and "Wings of Destiny". Shrapnel Records signed them in 1985 and financed the recording of five more songs to complete a self-titled album, that eventually appeared in 1986.

Kenny Kay left the group in 1987 and was replaced by John Macko. The group was signed a major label deal with Epic Records in 1988 and the debut album was re-released. As the band prepared to record a second album they brought on Kendall Bechtell to replace founding guitar player James Byrd. In 1989, the follow-up record, Time Will Tell appeared, but the band had lost its label support, with its members going their separate ways by 1990. However, in 1990, their song "Midnight Love" was used as the theme song for the TV show The Howard Stern Show, which would run until the summer of 1992.

In 2009 Ed Archer, John Macko and Kendall Bechtel reunited; they were joined by drummer Jeffrey McCormack and in 2010, the band played its first show in its history at the Keep it True Festival, with guest singer Peter Orullian (ex-Heir Apparent). McCormack left the group in 2011, along with announced lead singer David Fefolt (the latter performed on some demos, but never actually performed live or officially recorded with the band).

By 2017, Fifth Angel had been active once again. Original drummer Ken Mary rejoined the group, and vocalist Peter Orullian returned to sing for some 2017 engagements. The band booked two shows for the year: April 22, 2017 at El Corazon in Seattle, Washington, and the Keep it True Festival in Germany on April 29, 2017. The band also had a huge slate of demos that it planned to work on following the Keep It True Festival, in hopes of finally putting together a new record. Their third album, The Third Secret, was released on October 26, 2018 on Nuclear Blast. Fifth Angel announced it would headline Germany's Crusher Festival in 2024.

== Band members ==
=== Current members ===
- Ed Archer – guitar (1983–1989, 2010, 2017, 2018–present)
- Ken Mary – drums (1983–1989, 2017–present)
- John Macko – bass (1986–1989, 2010, 2017–present)
- Ethan Brosh – guitar (2019–present)
- Steven Carlson – vocals (2019–present)

=== Former members ===
- Ted Pilot – vocals (1983–1989)
- James Byrd – guitar (1983–1987)
- Kendall Bechtel – guitar (1987–1989, 2010, 2017–2019), vocals (2017–2019)
- Kenny Ray – bass (1983–1985)
- Richard Stuverud – drums (1989)
- Tim Branom - vocals (2010)
- Peter Orullian – vocals (2010, 2017)
- Jeffrey McCormack – drums (2010, 2017)
- Jim Dofka – guitar (2023)

== Discography ==
=== Studio albums ===
- Fifth Angel (Shrapnel, 1986; re-released on Epic, 1988) US No. 117
- Time Will Tell (Epic, 1989)
- The Third Secret (Nuclear Blast, 2018)
- When Angels Kill (Nuclear Blast, 2023)
