= Time Will Tell (Fifth Angel album) =

Studio album by Fifth Angel
- Released: August 23, 1989
- Recorded: 1989
- Studio: Carriage House, Stamford, Connecticut; Mediasound, New York City; Triad, Redmond, Washington
- Genre: Heavy metal; hard rock
- Length: 48:36
- Label: Epic
- Producer: Terry Brown

Fifth Angel chronology
Fifth Angel (1986)	Time Will Tell (1989)	The Third Secret (2018)

Time Will Tell is the second album by American heavy metal band Fifth Angel, released in 1989. It was produced by Terry Brown, and was Fifth Angel's last full-length studio album for 29 years, until the release of The Third Secret in 2018.

== Track listing ==
All music is composed by Ed Archer, Ted Pilot except where noted.

No.	Title	Writer(s)	Length
1.	"Cathedral"	Ed Archer, Ken Mary, Ted Pilot	4:08
2.	"Midnight Love"		4:38
3.	"Seven Hours"		4:51
4.	"Broken Dreams"	Archer, Mary, Pilot	4:56
5.	"Time Will Tell"	Archer, Kendall Bechtel, Pilot	4:23
6.	"Lights Out" (U.F.O. cover)	Michael Schenker, Phil Mogg, Andy Parker, Pete Way	4:05
7.	"Wait for Me"	Archer, John Macko, Pilot	4:48
8.	"Angel of Mercy"		4:32
9.	"We Rule"	Archer, Mary, Pilot	3:32
10.	"So Long"		4:48
11.	"Feel the Heat"		3:55
Total length:			48:36

== Personnel ==
- Ted Pilot – lead vocals
- Kendall Bechtel – lead guitar
- Ed Archer – rhythm guitar, keyboards
- John Macko – bass, keyboards
- Ken Mary – drums

=== Additional musicians ===
- Carol Howell – keyboards and programming
- Scott Humphrey – keyboards and programming
- Lisa Dal Bello – backing vocals on tracks 4 and 10

=== Production ===
- Terry Brown – producer
- Mixed at Metalworks Studios
- Noel Golden – engineer, mixing
- Artie Smith – drum technician
- Stephen Byram – art direction
- Amy Guip – illustration
- Derek Simon – management
