= Peter Orullian =

American writer and musician

- Born: August 31, 1969 (age 56); Salt Lake City, Utah, U.S.
- Education: University of Utah (BA)
- Occupations: Writer and musician
- Writing career
- Genre: Fantasy
- Website: orullian.com

Peter Orullian is an American fantasy author and musician. He currently resides in Seattle, Washington.

== Biography ==
Orullian graduated from the University of Utah with a BA Honors in English in 1991. He has since published short stories in various anthologies, including stories which are set in Aeshau Vaal, the fictional world of book The Unremembered. James Frenkel has written, "When I first read Peter Orullian's early draft of The Unremembered, I was attracted by the characters, and then by mysteries in the story that made me feel I absolutely had to find out what was going on. Then, as I read more, I realized that I was hooked on his world, which has a rich history and culture, as well as some surprises I couldn't have anticipated."

Orullian's musical endeavors include involvement in the Keep it True tour in Germany with Heir Apparent and creating albums with Inner Resonance and Continuum. In 2010 he took the stage with Fifth Angel as a guest vocalist.

== Bibliography ==
=== Books ===
- Metropolis Pt. 2: Scenes from a Memory, a novelization of progressive metal band Dream Theater's album of the same name (2024, upcoming)
- The Astonishing (co-written with John Petrucci), novelization of progressive metal band Dream Theater's album of the same name (2018, ISBN 1733810501)
- Wired for Madness, novelization of Dream Theater keyboardist Jordan Rudess's album of the same name (2019, ISBN 1733810528)
- At the Manger: The Stories of Those Who Were There (2001, ISBN 0-9712909-0-3)
- "Songs of the Dead," (co-written with Brandon Sanderson), Book 1 of a new series (forthcoming)

=== Vault of Heaven series ===
1. The Unremembered (2011, ISBN 0-7653-2571-3)
2. Trial of Intentions (2015, ISBN 978-0-7653-2572-3)

==== Short stories set in Aeshau Vaal (the world for his book The Unremembered) ====
- "Sacrifice of the First Sheason," (2011)
- "The Great Defense of Layosah," (2011)
- "The Sound of Broken Absolutes," Unfettered, edited by Shawn Speakman (2013)
- "The Battle of the Round," (2011)
- "A Beautiful Accident," Tor.Com (2015, ISBN 978-1-4668-8616-2)
- "The Hell of It," Tor.com (2015)
- "A Slow Kill," Unfettered II, edited by Shawn Speakman (2019)
- "Stories Are Gods," Unbound, edited by Shawn Speakman (2016)

=== Short stories ===
- "Lilith", in the Hags, Sirens, and Other Bad Girls of Fantasy Anthology (2006, ISBN 0-7564-0369-3)
- "God Uses a Rag", in the Cosmic Cocktails Anthology (2006, ISBN 0-7564-0398-7)
- "Beats of Seven", in Orson Scott Card's InterGalactic Medicine Show (2007, ISBN 0-7653-2000-2)
- "In Thought", in the Front Lines Anthology (2008, ISBN 978-0-7564-0478-9)
- "RPG Reunion", in the Crime Spells Anthology (2009, ISBN 0-7564-0538-6)
- "Canticle of Abraham and Isaac", in the Swordplay Anthology (2009, ISBN 0-7564-0559-9)
- "Guilt by Association", in the Intelligent Design Anthology (2009, ISBN 0-7564-0568-8)
- "Roxanne", in The Problem with Heroes Anthology (ISBN 0-7564-0579-3)
- "The Quality of Light Is not Strained," in Shared Nightmares, edited by Steve Diamond (2015)
- "A Fair Man," Grimdark Magazine, edited by Adrian Collins (2020)
- "The Paper Man," in Unfettered III, edited by Shawn Speakman (2021)
- "A Poor Reflection," in Unbound II (2022)
- "A Piece of Moveable Type," in The King Must Fall, edited by Adrian Collins (2022)

== Musical endeavors ==
=== Continuum ===
- Lead vocalist, also lyricist; co-writer on select tunes 1991-1993
  - Continuum (self-titled debut release) 1992
  - Continuum EP 1993

=== Inner Resonance ===
- Lead vocalist; also co-writer on select songs: 1997–2000
  - Solar Voices (debut release)

=== Heir Apparent ===
- Heir Apparent: 2006
  - Lead vocalist, Keep It True Festival, Lauda-Königshofen, Germany

=== Fifth Angel ===
- Fifth Angel: 2010, 2017
  - Lead vocalist, Keep It True Festival, Lauda-Königshofen, Germany (2010)
  - Lead vocalist, Keep It True Festival, Lauda-Königshofen, Germany (2017)

=== Symphony North ===
- Composer, producer, lyricist, and lead vocalist on select songs
  - The Bell Ringer (debut release), an original Christmas story and rock experience, in the vein of Trans-Siberian Orchestra
