= Shelly (model) =

Japanese model (born 1984)

- Born: 11 May 1984 (age 42); Yokohama, Kanagawa Prefecture, Japan
- Occupations: Model; tarento; television presenter
- Years active: 1999–present
- Agent: Stardust Promotion
- Style: Fashion
- Height: 1.64 m (5 ft 5 in)

Shelly (stylized as SHELLY, born 11 May 1984, in Yokohama, Kanagawa Prefecture) is a Japanese model, tarento, and television presenter. She has American citizenship. She is represented by Stardust Promotion.

== Politics ==
In 2015, in a rare display of political expression from a Japanese celebrity, Shelly expressed support for SEALDs, a student activist group which was protesting Shinzo Abe backed the Legislation for Peace and Security that expanded the kinds of armed conflict that the nation could participate in.

== Filmography ==
=== TV series ===
==== Current appearances ====
Year	Title	Network	Notes	Ref.
2011	Nikkei Special: Mirai Seiki Zipangu –Futtō Genba no Keizai-gaku–	TV Tokyo	Presenter; On maternity leave from 4 January to 15 April 2016	
2012	Hirunandesu!	NTV	Tuesday regular; On maternity leave from January to June 2016 (Note: Joy took her place before she joined.)	
2012	Konya kurabete mimashita	NTV	Presenter; On maternity leave from 2 February to 8 November; appeared as a guest on 8 November; the following week she returned as MC	

==== Quasi-regular appearances ====
Year	Title	Network	Notes
2007	The Best House 123	Fuji TV	
2008	Bakushō Red Carpet	Fuji TV	Jurist
2008	Hitachi Sekai fushigi Hakken!	TBS	Contestant
2013	Shiawase! Bomby Girl	NTV	Studio panelist
	Sokogashiritai: Tokusō! Bandō Research	CBC	

==== Former appearances ====
Year	Title	Network	Notes
2006	Rock Fujiyama	TV Tokyo	
2006	U-La-La	Tokyo MX	MC
2007	Shin Kankaku wakaru Tsukaeru Eibunhō	NHK-E	As Nancy
2008	Little Charo: Karada ni shimikomu Eikaiwa	NHK-E	Navigator
2008	Namahōsō Tokuban!! Little Charo: Kētai de Tamesou anata no Eigojikara 1	NHK-E	Navigator
2008	Little Charo: Kētai de Tamesou anata no Eigojikara 2	NHK-E	Navigator
2009	Little Charo: Kētai de Tamesou anata no Eigojikara 3	NHK-E	Navigator
2009	Little Charo: Kētai de Tamesou anata no Eigojikara 4	NHK-E	Navigator
2009	Digital Stadium	NHK BS2	
2009	Fuji Rock Festival	WOWOW	
2010	Little Charo 2: Eigo ni Koisuru Monogatari	NHK-E	Navigator
2011	A-Studio	TBS	3rd assistant
2011	Ikinari! Ōgane Densetsu.	TV Asahi	
2012	Ran × Suma: Machi no Kaze ni nare	NHK BS1	
2012	3-Kagetsu Topic Eikaiwa: Eigo de Tanoshimu! Little Charo –Tōhoku-hen–	NHK-E	Navigator
	7-Ri no Comte Samurai	NHK BS Premium	1st, 6th, 11th member
2013	Little Charo 4: Eigo de Aruku New York	NHK-E	Navigator
2013	Home-Comi: Nippon Daisuki Gaikoku Hito Sekai no Mura ni Satogaeri	MBS	
2014	Summers no Sekai no sugēni Twitetter	MBS	Regular Twitetter

==== One-off programmes ====
Year	Title	Network	Notes
	Kensaku de Go! Totte oki Seikaiisan	NHK-G	
	Horiken no Kandō Shin Taiken: Dōbutsu Scoop Ōkoku	HBC	
2010	Nande Suiri Show: Hatena no Deguchi	Fuji TV	
	Miracle Jikken Show	SUT	
2011	Oha! 6 News Live Special	NTV	Oha! 6 Special MC (Note: Produced by and aired in NTV News 24.)
2012	Shiawase no Kiiroi Koinu	CTV	Guest with Tatsuo Umemiya
2013	4 Yoru Renzoku Chiteki tanken Special: Renai wa Kagakuda!	Fuji TV	
2013	Nana-ri no Comte Samurai	NHK BS Premium	
2014	Chikyuunohate: Hoshi Furu Sabaku to Maboroshino Hanazono Nanbei Tairiku e	TBS	MC
2014	Tomoni Ikiteiku: Shelly to Daniel ga Aruita Tōhoku 500-kilo	BS Japan	
2014	Sā, Ashita wa Getsuyōbi	TV Tokyo	Presenter
2016	Mimigaitai TV	NTV	Corner MC

=== Radio ===
Year	Title	Network	Notes
2006	Kiss And Hug	J-Wave	Navigator
2014	Shelly Go Round	NBS	Personality
	Shinbō Jirō Zoom: Soko made Iu ka!	NBS	

=== Serials ===
Title
CD Journal "Shelly's Happy×2 Talk"

=== Advertisements ===
Title	Notes	Ref.
Kanebo Cosmetics Coffret D'or		
Kirin Beverage Fire neo	Co-starred with Junichi Okada, Bananaman, Knights, Casey Takamine, Sérgio Echigo, and Dave Spector	
Taisho Pharmaceutical Co. Lipovitan	Co-starred with Kie Kitano and Fumino Kimura	
Kao Corporation Clear Clean EX		
Kao Corporation Clear Clean Senkōeki Direct Wash		
Kanebo Cosmetics Jun ururi	Co-starring with Ikko	
Ajinomoto Consommé		
Kirin Brewery Nodogoshi All Right	Co-starring with Keisuke Koide	

=== Others ===
Year	Title	Notes	Ref.
2010	Saru Lock: The Movie public memorial event	MC; The event was censored for two minutes due to unforeseen circumstances. She appearance at U-La-La @ 7 "Geinō U-La-La" was later broadcast on 22 February of the same year. (Note: At the same time Tokyo MX News and Mie Television Broadcasting aired Tottemo Wakudoki! in a similar manner.)	
2011	Yokohama Tai Yakult ceremonial first pitch		
