= Wall of Sound (album) =

Studio album by Marty Friedman
- Released: August 4, 2017
- Studio: Studio 606, Northridge, CA
- Genre: Instrumental rock
- Length: 53:39
- Label: Prosthetic Records
- Producer: Marty Friedman

Marty Friedman chronology
Inferno (2014)	Wall of Sound (2017)	Tokyo Jukebox 3 (2020)

Professional ratings
Review scores
Source	Rating
Blabbermouth.net	9/10 stars

Wall of Sound is the twelfth studio album by the American guitarist Marty Friedman, released on August 4, 2017, through Prosthetic Records.

== Track listing ==
All tracks are written by Marty Friedman.

No.	Title	Length
1.	"Self Pollution"	5:53
2.	"Sorrow and Madness"	6:40
3.	"Streetlight"	4:05
4.	"Whiteworm"	4:35
5.	"For a Friend"	3:18
6.	"Pussy Ghost"	5:57
7.	"The Blackest Rose"	3:40
8.	"Something to Fight"	4:45
9.	"The Soldier"	3:57
10.	"Miracle"	3:53
11.	"Last Lament"	6:56
Total length:		53:39

== Personnel ==
- Marty Friedman - guitars, bass
- Kiyoshi - bass
- Anup Sastry - drums
- Hiyori Okuda - cello (Self Pollution, Sorrow And Madness, Streetlight, The Soldier, Last Lament)
- Nicolas Farmakalidis - piano (Sorrow And Madness)
- Tatsuya Nishiwaki - piano (Sorrow And Madness, Streetlight, The Blackest Rose, Miracle)
- Jinxx - violin

== Charts ==
Chart (2017)	Peak position
US Billboard 200	12
US Heatseekers Albums (Billboard)	153
US Independent Albums (Billboard)	26
