= One Nation Underground (Hawaii album) =

Studio album by Hawaii
- Released: November 1983
- Recorded: March–May 1983
- Studio: Rendez-Vous Recording, Honolulu, Hawaii
- Genre: Speed metal
- Length: 34:09
- Label: Shrapnel
- Producer: Hawaii, Pierre Grill

Hawaii chronology
One Nation Underground (1983)	Loud, Wild and Heavy (1984)

Professional ratings
Review scores
Source	Rating
AllMusic	2.5/5 stars
Collector's Guide to Heavy Metal	6/10
Metal Forces	7/10

One Nation Underground is the title of the first studio album released by Hawaii, a speed metal band from the United States.

== Track listing ==
All songs by Marty Friedman and Jeff Graves, except where indicated.

Side one
No.	Title	Writer(s)	Length
1.	"Living in Sin"	Friedman, Graves, Gary St. Pierre	3:15
2.	"Silent Nightmare"	Friedman, Graves, St. Pierre	3:01
3.	"One Nation Underground"	Friedman, Graves, St. Pierre	4:03
4.	"You're Gonna Burn"	Friedman, Graves, St. Pierre	4:05
5.	"Escape the Night"		3:49

Side two
No.	Title	Length
6.	"Nitro Power"	4:26
7.	"The Pit and the Pendulum"	3:07
8.	"Secret of the Stars"	4:38
9.	"Overture Volcanica"	3:42

== Notes ==
- "Living in Sin" and "Escape the Night" had previously been recorded by Marty Friedman's pre-Hawaii outfit Vixen for their Made in Hawaii EP (1983). "Secrets of the Stars" was also featured on the Shrapnel Records compilation U.S. Metal Vol. III (1983).

== Personnel ==
Hawaii

- Gary St. Pierre - bass guitar, lead vocals
- Marty Friedman - guitars, backing vocals
- Jeff Graves - drums, backing vocals

Additional musicians

- Rocky DeSopa, Roger Holland - additional backing vocals

Production

- Pierre Grill - producer, engineer
