= Rolly Teranishi =

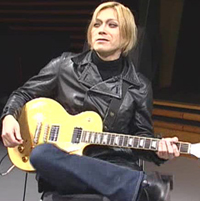

Background information
- Born: September 6, 1963 (age 63); Osaka, Japan
- Genres: Rock; glam rock
- Instruments: Guitar; banjo; mandolin
- Years active: 1982–present
- Member of: Scanch
- Website: Rollynet.com

Rolly Teranishi (ローリー 寺西, Rōrī Teranishi) more commonly known as Rolly, is a Japanese musician and music producer.

== Personal life ==
Teranishi was born Kazuo Teranishi (寺西 一雄, Teranishi Kazuo; on September 6, 1963) in Kyoto. He grew up in Takatsuki, Osaka, Japan.

== Career ==
Teranishi was the lead guitarist and singer of the Japanese rock band, Scanch (すかんち, Sukanchi). Scanch continued until 1996. Once Scanch broke up, Rolly pursued his solo musical career and also acting.

Teranishi played Genesis in the Japanese thriller Suicide Circle (2002). He is in the movies Iden & Tity, Swallowtail, Get It On?. He also made an appearance as "Yaha" in the PlayStation 2 game Drag-on Dragoon 2.

2006 was the 15th-year anniversary of Scanch. All the members of Scanch reunited for two concerts that occurred on March 10 and March 17. It was also released on CD (Scanch’n’Roll Show II).

Teranishi starred in a TV show called Rock Fujiyama alongside Marty Friedman, ex lead guitarist of the thrash metal band Megadeth. Rolly also appears in his own television show Rolly Kingdom every two weeks, and also co-hosts KKTV, a family show that airs every Saturday night.

He has also contributed to the soundtrack of Kamen Rider Agito for his performance of the third ending theme "Deep Breath." This was the second song that he performed as the lead vocalist for Rider Chips, after being featured as a vocalist on "Power Child."

He served as the Japanese voice of Tamatoa in the Japanese dub version of the Disney film Moana.

In 2017, he was Amos Callaway in the Japanese production of the Big Fish musical.

== Discography ==
Scanch

- Scanch’n’Roll Show (1988)
- Ultra Operation of Love Affair for All the Young Boys and Girls (1990)
- Ultra Romantic Bombers for the Unlimited Lovers of the World (1991)
- A Case Of Rosy Murder For Miracle Lovers Only (1992)
- Opera (1993)
- Gold (1994)
- Sweets – Scanch Best Collection (1994)
- Double Double Chocolate (1995)
- Historic Grammar (1996)
- CD & DVD – The Best Scanch (2005)
- Scanch’n’Roll Show II (2006)

Solo

- "Rolly's Rock Theater" (2016)
- Rolly's RockyRolly (1996)
- Bootleg (1995)
- Rolly Original Musical Songs (2001)
- 2001 (2001)
- Steel Hard Rocker (2003)
- Rolly in Aoiheya (2005)

Singles

- "SOS '99" (1998)
- "Muchi Muchi Rock'n'Roll" (1999)
- "Transformation" (2000)
- "Samurai" (2001) – the opening theme song to The Family's Defensive Alliance

Others

- Kamen Rider Black (Cover), Masked Rider Spirits 2000 Live (2000)
- 21st Century Stars (1996)
- Kiss Tribute in Japan (1998)
- Kamen Rider Agito (2002)
- Rider Chips – Otonagai (2005)
- Heavy Metal Thunder (2005)
- The Auris (Super) Band (2006)
- Rock Fujiyama Band (2006)
- Tribute To David Bowie (2007)

== Filmography ==
Film

- Suicide Club (2002)
- Saya Zamurai (2010)
- Too Young To Die! (2016)
- Hit Me Anyone One More Time (2019)
- KY Rock (2024)

Moana- Tamatoa (Japanese dub)

Television

- Ataru (2012, guest appearance)
- Garo: Makai no Hana (2014)
