= Inferno (Marty Friedman album) =

Studio album by Marty Friedman
- Released: May 27, 2014
- Genre: Progressive metal; avant-garde metal; instrumental rock
- Length: 48:45
- Label: Prosthetic
- Producer: Marty Friedman

Marty Friedman chronology
Metal Clone X (2012)	Inferno (2014)	Wall of Sound (2017)

Professional ratings
Review scores
Source	Rating
Blabbermouth.net	9.5/10 stars

Inferno is the eleventh studio album by guitarist Marty Friedman, released in 2014 through Prosthetic Records.

== Track listing ==
All tracks are written by Marty Friedman, unless otherwise noted.

No.	Title	Writer(s)	Length
1.	"Inferno"		5:42
2.	"Resin"		4:38
3.	"Wicked Panacea" (Featuring Rodrigo y Gabriela)	Friedman, Rodrigo y Gabriela	3:03
4.	"Steroidhead" (Featuring Keshav Dhar)	Friedman, Keshav Dhar	3:18
5.	"I Can't Relax" (Featuring Danko Jones)	Friedman, Danko Jones	3:15
6.	"Meat Hook" (Featuring Jørgen Munkeby)	Friedman, Jørgen Munkeby	3:36
7.	"Hyper Doom"		1:55
8.	"Sociopaths" (Featuring Dave Davidson)	Friedman, Dave Davidson	6:14
9.	"Lycanthrope" (Featuring Danko Jones and Alexi Laiho)	Friedman, Danko Jones, Alexi Laiho	4:03
10.	"Undertow"		4:22
11.	"Horrors"	Friedman, Jason Becker	6:50
12.	"Inferno (Reprise)"		1:56
Total length:			48:45

=== Japanese Bonus tracks ===
No.	Title	Writer(s)	Length
13.	"Jasmine Cyanide" (Featuring Skyharbor and Danko Jones)	Friedman, Skyharbor, Danko Jones	4:28
14.	"Ballad of the Barbie Bandits" (Full Studio Version)		2:21
Total length:			56:16

== Personnel ==
=== Main personnel ===
- Marty Friedman - lead & rhythm guitar (all tracks)
- Toshiki Oomomo - bass (tracks 1–3, 5–7, 11–12, 14)
- Jens Bogren - mixing
- Tony Lindgren - mastering

=== Additional musicians ===
- Keshav Dhar - guitar (tracks 4, 13)
- Danko Jones - vocals (tracks 5, 9, 13)
- Daniel Tompkins - vocals (track 13)
- Alexi Laiho - vocals, lead guitar (track 9)
- Dave Davidson - vocals, guitar (track 8)
- Anup Sastry - drums (tracks 1–9, 11–14)
- Gregg Bissonette - drums (track 10)
- Tony Franklin - bass (track 10)
- Chris Aiken - bass (track 4, 13)
- Jens Johansson - keyboards (track 10)
- Ramin Sakurai - keyboards (tracks 2–3, 10)
- Brian BecVar - keyboards (tracks 10, 14)
- Wachu - keyboards (tracks 10, 14)
- Nicolas Farmakalidis - piano, keyboards (tracks 6, 10, 14)
- Jørgen Munkeby - saxophone (track 6)
- Ewan Dobson - acoustic guitar (track 11)

== Charts ==
Chart (2014)	Peak position
US Heatseekers Albums (Billboard)	4
