= Loudspeaker (album) =

Studio album by Marty Friedman
- Released: June 28, 2006 (Japan); September 18, 2006 (Europe); November 14, 2006 (South Korea); March 13, 2007 (US)
- Recorded: 2005–2006
- Genre: Instrumental rock
- Length: 47:07
- Labels: Avex (Japan); Shrapnel Records (U.S.A.)
- Producers: Allen Isaacs; Marty Friedman

Marty Friedman chronology
Music for Speeding (2003)	Loudspeaker (2006)	Future Addict (2008)

Professional ratings
Review scores
Source	Rating
Blog Injection	5.5/10 stars

Loudspeaker is the sixth studio album by guitarist Marty Friedman, released in 2006 in Japan, and 2007 in United States. It entered the Japanese national chart at #33. This marks the first Top 40 chart position for any of his solo albums.

The album features guest performances of Steve Vai, Kirito, John Petrucci, Jens Johansson, Mick Karn, Masaki, Ryuichi Nishida, and Billy Sheehan.

== Track listings ==
No.	Title	Length
1.	"Elixir"	4:35
2.	"Street Demon" (Santa Rosa Wrecking Crew mix)	3:30
3.	"Black Orchid" (featuring John Petrucci)	4:31
4.	"Paradise Express"	4:47
5.	"Sekai Ni Hitotsu Dake No Hana" (SMAP cover)	4:16
6.	"Glycerine Flesh"	5:15
7.	"Stigmata Addiction"	7:07
8.	"Viper" (featuring Steve Vai)	3:05
9.	"Static Rain" (Instrumental Version)	2:51
10.	"Coloreas Mi Vida"	3:13
11.	"Devil Take Tomorrow"	3:59

Japan Limited edition release
No.	Title	Length
1.	"Elixir"	4:35
2.	"Street Demon" (Santa Rosa Wrecking Crew mix)	3:30
3.	"Black Orchid" (featuring John Petrucci)	4:31
4.	"Paradise Express"	4:47
5.	"Sekai Ni Hitotsu Dake No Hana" (SMAP cover)	4:16
6.	"Glycerine Flesh"	5:15
7.	"Stigmata Addiction"	7:08
8.	"Viper" (featuring Steve Vai)	3:05
9.	"Coloreas Mi Vida"	3:13
10.	"Devil Take Tomorrow"	4:00
11.	"Static Rain" (featuring KIRITO)	2:47

== Musicians ==
- Marty Friedman - guitars (all tracks), bass (6,8,9)
- Ryuichi Nishida - drums (1,2,3,4,6,10)
- Jeremy Colson - drums (5,7,8,11)
- Tetsu Mukaiyama - drums (9)
- Billy Sheehan - bass (1,4)
- Masaki - bass (2,3,5,7)
- Mick Karn - bass (10)
- Ikuo - bass (11)
- John Petrucci - lead guitar (3)
- Steve Vai - lead guitar (8)
- Jens Johansson - keyboards (6)
- Geri Soriano-Lightwood - voice (10)
- Ramin Sakurai - manipulation (10)
- Tom Harriman - manipulation (10), string arrangement (11)

Track numbers are shown according to "second" pressing
