= Music for Speeding =

Studio album by Marty Friedman
- Released: May 20, 2003
- Genre: Instrumental rock, hard rock
- Length: 47:09
- Label: Favored Nations

Marty Friedman chronology
True Obsessions (1996)	Music for Speeding (2003)	Loudspeaker (2006)

Professional ratings
Review scores
Source	Rating
Allmusic	link

Music for Speeding is the fifth studio album by guitarist Marty Friedman, released on May 20, 2003 through Favored Nations Entertainment. It was his first solo album since True Obsessions in 1996 and since leaving Megadeth in January 2000. It was also the first album without drummer Nick Menza after three albums, as Jeremy Colson took over the drums.

== Track listing ==
No.	Title	Length
1.	"Gimme a Dose"	3:45
2.	"Fuel Injection Stingray"	3:27
3.	"Ripped"	4:24
4.	"It's the Unreal Thing"	4:02
5.	"Cheer Girl Rampage"	3:59
6.	"Lust for Life"	4:25
7.	"Lovesorrow"	4:25
8.	"Nastymachine"	4:27
9.	"Catfight"	3:56
10.	"Corazon de Santiago"	3:50
11.	"0-7-2"	0:40
12.	"Salt in the Wound"	2:02
13.	"Novocaine Kiss"	3:47

== Personnel ==
- Marty Friedman – guitars, programming and sequencing, shamisen
- Jimmy O'Shea – bass
- Barry Sparks – bass
- Jeremy Colson – drums
- Brian Becvar - keyboards
- James "Jake" Jacobson – synths and arrangements on track 7
- Jason Moss – additional programming
- Ben Woods – flamenco guitar on track 7
