= Perspective (Jason Becker album) =

Studio album by Jason Becker
- Released: May 21, 1996
- Genres: Neoclassical metal, instrumental rock, baroque music, world music, blues, blues rock, avant-garde metal
- Length: 60:43
- Label: Jason Becker Music
- Producers: Jason Becker, Danny Alvarez, Mike Bemesderfer, Steve Hunter

Jason Becker chronology
Perpetual Burn (1988)	Perspective (1996)	The Raspberry Jams (1999)

Alternative cover
- 2001 reissue

Professional ratings
Review scores
Source	Rating
AllMusic	4/5 stars

Perspective is the second studio album by the guitarist Jason Becker, released independently on May 21, 1996, through Jason Becker Music and reissued on May 22, 2001, through Warner Bros. Records.

According to Becker's web site, the album features "Steve Perry, Michael Lee Firkins, Matt and Gregg Bissonette, Steve Hunter, members of Bobby McFerrin’s Voicestra and members of the San Francisco Girls Chorus."

== Track listing ==
All tracks are written by Jason Becker, except where noted.

No.	Title	Length
1.	"Primal"	7:03
2.	"Rain" (Becker, Billy Duffy)	3:14
3.	"End of the Beginning"	11:46
4.	"Higher"	5:28
5.	"Blue"	4:46
6.	"Life and Death"	9:11
7.	"Empire"	5:15
8.	"Serrana"	8:38
9.	"Meet Me in the Morning" (Bob Dylan)	5:22
Total length:		60:43

== Musicians ==
- Jason Becker - guitar, orchestration
- Ehren Becker - bass guitar
- Caren Anderson - soprano vocals
- Danny Alvarez - keyboards, organ, percussion, piano, Synclavier
- Gary Becker - classical guitar
- Gregg Bissonette - drums, fretless bass
- Joey Blake - vocals
- Cathy Ellis - soprano vocals
- Steve Hunter - rain stick, clean guitar, "that cool harmonic thing", production
- Raz Kennedy - choir/chorus, vocals
- Steve Perry - guest vocals
- Melanie Rath - soloist, vocals
- Steve Rosenthal - cymbals, snare drums
- Gary Schwantes - bamboo flute
- David Stuligross - trombone
- Anisha Thomas - soprano vocal
- Rick Walker - percussion
- Michael Lee Firkins - guitar

== Personnel ==
- Jason Becker - composer, cover design, mixing, art direction
- Danny Alvarez - digital enhancement, editing, engineer,
- Mike Bemesderfer - digital enhancement, editing, engineer, mixing, WX7 wind controller
- Gary Becker - executive producer, illustrations, introduction, paintings, photography,
- Annie Calef - cover art concept, graphic design
- Dave Collins - mastering
- Glen A. Frendel - engineer
- Tony Mills - engineer
- Chris Minto - engineer
- Jeff Sheehan - assistant engineer
- John Lowry - engineer
