= Jackson Kelly (guitar) =

Modified version of the Gibson Explorer guitar

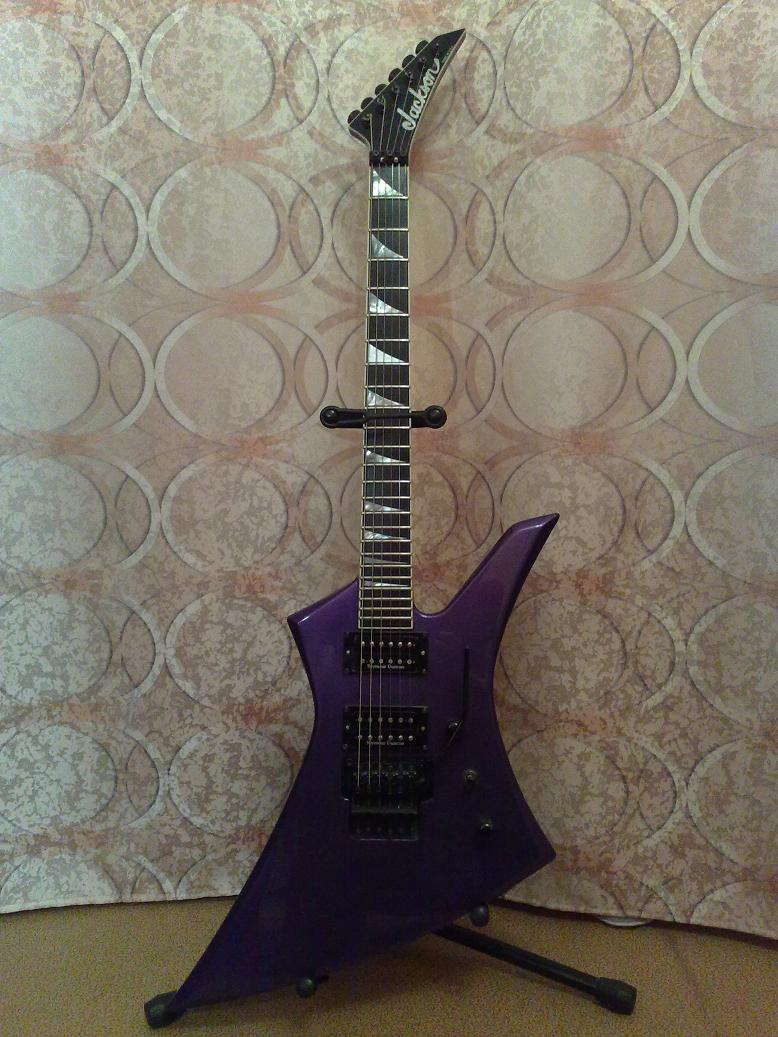
- Jackson USA KE-2
- Manufacturer: Jackson Guitars
- Period: 1982-present

Construction
- Body type: Solid
- Neck joint: Neck-thru, Bolt-on

Woods
- Body: Alder, Basswood
- Neck: Maple
- Fretboard: Rosewood, Ebony

Hardware
- Bridge: Locking tremolo and Fixed
- Pickup: H-H

Colors available
- Gloss Black, Vanilla Shake, Tobacco Sunburst, Midnight Wine, Ferrari Red, Ivory, Silverburst, Snow White, Viola Burst

The Jackson Kelly or KE is a heavily modified version of the Gibson Explorer produced by Jackson Guitars. The guitar has been in production since the early 1980s, and is available in several different formats. It was heavily popularized in the early to mid 1990s due to its use by the guitarist Marty Friedman of Megadeth.

== History ==
It was designed by and named after Bradford Kelly, guitarist for Australian heavy metal band Heaven in the early '80s. It was later more popularized by Megadeth guitarist Marty Friedman who had his own signature model at the time.

The Jackson Kelly has been available in several formats over the years, some having been removed from production such as the Marty Friedman signature model, the Jackson KE1, and the 'Professional' series.

== Design ==
The Kelly typically features the classic Jackson pointed head-stock. The neck is generally of a very thin profile, featuring a standard 24 jumbo frets, a neck-thru design and is generally quite extended from the body. These factors grant the Kelly a very high level of play-ability, especially in genres such as heavy metal. The only exception to this is the 'JS32', an entry-level model that had a bolt-neck and dot style inlays, although the JS32 model now features Sharkfin inlays. The PS6T of the Performer Series is a Bolt on 22 fret version of the Kelly.

The neck generally features shark fin inlays and has a Rosewood or Ebony fingerboard. The body is made of usually either Alder or Basswood.

The guitar is available in both active and passive pickup design. The first model of the Jackson Kelly to feature active pickups is the 'Jackson KEXMG', of the 'Jackson X Series' range. It features an active 'EMG 81' pickup in the bridge position, and an active 'EMG 85' in the neck position. In 2020 Jackson announced a signature Jeff Loomis Kelly model that featured Jeff Loomis own signature Seymour Duncan Blackouts. With exception to the KEXMG and Jeff Loomis signature, all other models contain passive pickups. The entry level 'JS32' features stock Jackson pickups, whilst the more expensive models feature differing models of Seymour Duncan pickups.

The model can come equipped with a locking tremolo system. Generally, it is a Floyd Rose Special, though in the more expensive models that are produced in the US, Floyd Rose Original systems are used. The 'JS32' models can also come with a Jackson-licensed Floyd Rose. Vision Eternel guitarist Alexander Julien notably used a Jackson Kelly KE3 equipped with a Floyd Rose SpeedLoader bridge.

As standard, the Jackson Kelly features a volume knob, a tone knob and a switch to change the pickup being used.

It is available in several colours, most popularly 'Gloss Black'.

== Notable Users ==
- Bradford Kelly
- Marty Friedman
- Jeff Loomis
- Adrian Smith
- Brandon Ellis
- Dan Gargiulo

== See also ==
- Gibson Explorer
- Dean Z
- Jackson Guitars
- Heaven
- Marty Friedman
- Sodom
- Jeff Loomis
