= Scanch =

Japanese rock band

- Origin: Japan
- Genres: Glam rock
- Years active: 1982–1996, 2006 and 2007 (reunions), 2010–present
- Labels: Sony Records
- Members: Rolly shima-chang
- Past members: Ogawa Bunmei; Doctor Tanaka; Obata Pump

Scanch (Japanese: すかんち, Hepburn: Sukanchi) is a Japanese rock band originally active from 1982 to 1996. The members of Scanch met and formed the band in 1982 - while they were still in high school. The band started with Rolly, shima-chang, Obata Pump and Doctor Tanaka as members.

By the year 1990, they had their debut carried out from CBS/Sony. Dr. Tanaka left the band in 1993 and as a new keyboardist for the band they got Ogawa Bunmei. The remaining members continued the band until 1996.

Scanch has also lent their songs "Bomber Love" and "Namida no Sentakukamoku" to the anime K.O. Beast.

== Members ==
- Rolly – guitar, vocals
- shima-chang – bass, vocals
- Kenji Sato (佐藤研二) – support bass (2010–present)

Former members

- Ogawa Bunmei (小川文明) – keyboards (died 2014)
- Doctor Tanaka (ドクター田中) – keyboards (died 2019)
- Obata Pump (小畑ポンプ) – drums (until 2023)

== Discography ==
Studio albums

- Ojitasu no Nazo (オジタスの謎; 1985)
- Scanch'n Roll Show (1988)
- Ultra Operation of Love Affair For All the Young Boys and Girls (恋のウルトラ大作戦; 1990)
- Ultra Romantic Bombers For Unlimited Lovers in the World (恋のロマンティック大爆撃; 1991)
- A Case of Rosy Murder For Miracle Lovers Only (恋の薔薇薔薇殺人事件; 1992)
- Opera (1993)
- Gold (1994)
- Double Double Chocolate (1995)
- Scanch'n Roll Show II (2006)

Singles

- "Love's T.K.O." (恋のT.K.O.; 1990)
- "Love's $1,000,000 Man" (恋の1,000,000$マン; 1990)
- "Love's Romantic Boogie" (恋のロマンティック・ブギ; 1991)
- "Magic Love Potion" (恋のマジックポーション; 1991)
- "Miracle Summer of Love" (恋のミラクルサマー; 1992)
- "My Beloved Mary-lou" (恋するマリールー; 1992)
- "You You You" (1993)
- "Love Is The Last Fairy Tale" (恋は最後のフェアリー・テール; 1994)
- "Liar's Paradise" (うそつき天国; 1994)
- "It Always Rains in December" (12月はいつもレイン; 1994)
- "Letter Man" (レターマン; 1995)
- "Pechika" (ペチカ; 1995)
- "If It Were Christmas Everyday" (もしも毎日がクリスマスだったら; 1995)

Compilation albums

- Sweets (1994)
- Historic Grammar (1996)
- Star Box Extra (2001)
- The Best of Scanch (2005)
- 30th (2012, self cover album)
