= Dragon's Kiss =

Studio album by Marty Friedman
- Released: August 8, 1988
- Studios: Prairie Sun Recording Studios, Cotati, California
- Genres: Instrumental rock, neoclassical metal
- Length: 36:06
- Label: Shrapnel
- Producer: Marty Friedman

Marty Friedman chronology
Dragon's Kiss (1988)	Scenes (1992)

Dragon's Kiss is the first studio album by the American heavy metal guitarist Marty Friedman, released on August 8, 1988, through Shrapnel Records (United States) and Roadrunner Records (Europe). The album was reissued on CD in 1991.

Friedman would later send a copy of the album to Megadeth frontman Dave Mustaine, who upon hearing the album, would hire Friedman. Friedman would subsequently feature on Megadeth's 1990 studio album, Rust in Peace.

== Critical reception ==
Professional ratings
Review scores
Source	Rating
AllMusic	4.5/5 stars
Collector's Guide to Heavy Metal	8/10
Kerrang!	3.75/5 stars
Rock Hard	8.0/10

In a contemporary review, Holger Stratmann of Rock Hard did not recommend the album, but considered it as "quite good" in mixing "speed and folkloric influences from his old days in Hawaii" with "the typical and probably indispensable nature of the Shrapnel horde."

Andy Hinds of AllMusic considered Dragon's Kiss an excellent album, and wrote that it "may be the most definitive sampling of Friedman's talents available." Martin Popoff in his Collector's Guide to Heavy Metal described Dragon's Kiss as "a structured album of artful instrumental rock that kills all that came before" and "ushered in a new classy, mature era in shred records."

== Track listing ==
All music is composed by Marty Friedman, except where noted.

Side one
No.	Title	Length
1.	"Saturation Point" (Friedman, Jason Becker)	4:53
2.	"Dragon Mistress"	3:41
3.	"Evil Thrill"	5:31
4.	"Namida (Tears)"	2:47

Side two
No.	Title	Length
5.	"Anvils"	2:38
6.	"Jewel" (Friedman, Becker)	4:05
7.	"Forbidden City"	8:18
8.	"Thunder March"	4:13
Total length:		36:06

== Personnel ==
Credits adapted from liner notes, except as otherwise noted.

Musicians

- Marty Friedman – guitar, bass, keyboard
- Jason Becker – additional guitar solos (tracks 1, 6)
- Deen Castronovo – drums
- Maija – piano (track 1)

Production

- Marty Friedman – producer
- Dino Alden – engineering
- George Horn – mastering at Fantasy Studios, Berkeley, California
- Dave Stephens Graphics – graphic design
- Pat Johnson Studios – photography
- Ross Pelton – Deen Castronovo photo
- Mike Varney – executive producer
