= Prairie Sun Recording Studios =

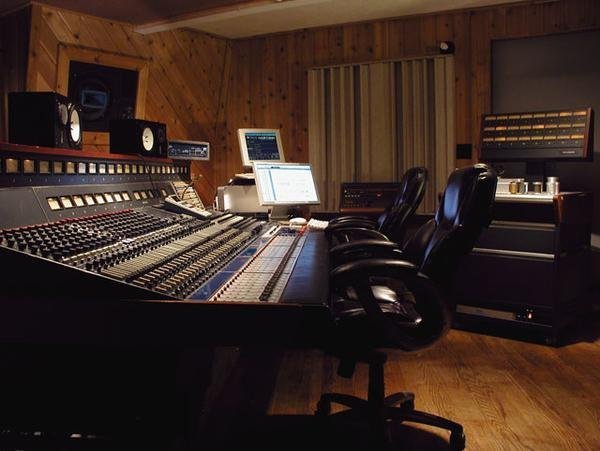
- Located north of San Francisco, Prairie Sun Recording Studios was founded by Mark "Mooka" Rennick in the late 1970s.

General information
- Type: Independent
- Hardware: Vintage analogue/digital
- Software: Pro Tools HD
- Associated: Eric Gales, Primus, Tom Waits
- Website: www.prairiesun.com

Prairie Sun Recording Studios is an audio recording studio located in Cotati, California. It began operations in 1978 with engineer and studio owner Mark "Mooka" Rennick and co-owner Clifton Buck-Kauffman. It is a complex based on a 10-acre former chicken farm with three recording studios, a guest lounge, office building, and guest house facility. The studio is a turnkey destination with facilities for tracking, mixing, and mastering.

== History ==
Prairie Sun co-owner, Mark "Mooka" Rennick, is a musician (bass player, primarily) who toured with Commander Cody's Billy C. Farlow in the late 1970s. After trying to balance life as a touring musician with that of a studio owner/producer, he left the road for his - at that time - garage-style studio near Sonoma State University, which is what initially brought him to the area from his native Illinois. "I started with the Beach Boys' 'Clover' mixing desk and a 1-inch 8-track machine," recalls Rennick. "Then I got a 2-inch 16-track, and by 1979 I had bought a 24-track 2-inch machine from Wally Heider's Studio when they went out of business. So, 'Boom,' I'm in the studio business - because I had the hardware."

In 1981, Mooka teamed up with chicken-ranch owner Clifton Buck-Kauffman and relocated Prairie Sun to his 12-acre farm. The studio became known as a residential recording facility, combining vintage analogue devices with the modern digital recording technology. The studio evolved to become a complete audio destination: living areas, rehearsal space for pre-production, tracking/overdubbing rooms, and mixing/mastering suites. The sole permanent resident of Prairie Sun is studio cat Bubba Feats.

== Recording artists ==
Artists that Prairie Sun has recorded include: Tony MacAlpine, Jason Becker, Cacophony, Vinnie Moore, Tom Waits, John Hammond Jr., AFI, ...And You Will Know Us by the Trail of Dead, Primus, Exodus, Racer X, Groundation, The Mountain Goats, Steel Train, UFO, Rob Wasserman, Norton Buffalo, Neko Case, Booker T. Jones, High on Fire, Carlos Santana, Charlie Musselwhite, Steve Kimock, Kehoe Nation, Larry Coryell, Joe Louis Walker, Raw Sun, Volker Strifler, Ramblin' Jack Elliot, Dick Dale, Doobie Brothers, Elvin Bishop, Eric Gales, Faith No More, Gregg Allman, Journey, Steve Smith, Michael Schenker, Huey Lewis and the News, Nine Inch Nails, The Tubes, Paul McCartney, Wu-Tang Clan, Van Morrison, Roy Rogers, Marty Friedman, The Cuts, Kenny Loggins, Chris Duarte and Gavin Bryars (who recorded Waits' section of Jesus' Blood Never Failed Me Yet at Prairie Sun).

== Record labels ==
Prairie Sun has worked with labels in the music industry from major to independent: Birdman Records, 4AD, Drive-Thru Records, BGP, Capitol Records, Epic Records, Geffen Records, Island Records, Relativity Records, SBK, MTV, Mint Records, Blind Pig Records, Columbia Records, Epitaph Records, Interscope Records, MCA Records, National, Geographic, Roadrunner Records, Relapse Records, Luaka Bop, Kamikaze Records, Surf Dog, Atlantic Records, Necropolis Records, Relix Records, Rykodisc Records, Warner Bros. Records, Ze Flat Tire Music, Shrapnel Records, Virgin Records, Young Tree Inc., Pointblank Records, Tone Center and Magna Carta.
