= Jason Becker =

American guitarist and composer (born 1969)

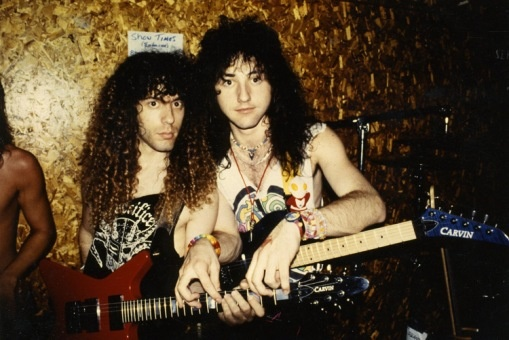
- Jason Becker (right) with Cacophony bandmate Marty Friedman in 1989

Background information
- Born: Jason Eli Becker; July 22, 1969 (age 57); Richmond, California, U.S.
- Genres: Instrumental rock, neoclassical metal, heavy metal
- Occupations: Musician, composer
- Instrument: Guitar
- Years active: 1986–present
- Label: Shrapnel
- Formerly of: Cacophony
- Website: jasonbecker.com

Jason Eli Becker (born July 22, 1969) is an American composer and guitarist. At the age of 16, he became part of the Shrapnel Records-produced duo Cacophony with his friend Marty Friedman, and they released two albums, Speed Metal Symphony (1987) and Go Off! (1989). Since the dissolution of Cacophony in 1989, Becker has undertaken a solo career, releasing seven albums since his 1988 debut Perpetual Burn. He later joined David Lee Roth's solo band and recorded one album with him, A Little Ain't Enough.

Becker's performing career was cut short by amyotrophic lateral sclerosis (ALS), which he was diagnosed with in 1990. By 1996, Becker had lost the ability to speak, and he now communicates with his eyes via a system developed by his father. He continues to compose with the aid of a computer and has since released Collection in 2008 and Triumphant Hearts in 2018, as well as various compilations.

== Biography and career ==
=== Early years ===
Becker was born in Richmond Hospital on 23rd Street on July 22, 1969, and raised in Richmond, California, by his parents, Gary and Patricia (Heffley) Becker. His maternal grandfather was actor Wayne Heffley. He was exposed to the guitar at an early age by both his father and his uncle, who were guitar players. He absorbed all kinds of music from around the world and melded different aspects of each style into his playing. He cited Bob Dylan, Eric Clapton, Jimi Hendrix and Eddie Van Halen as early influences.

=== Cacophony and solo career ===
Becker started out playing alongside Marty Friedman in the Mike Varney-produced duo, Cacophony. Together, they put out two albums, Speed Metal Symphony in 1987 and Go Off! in 1989, and toured Japan and the U.S. While they never went mainstream in the U.S., they proved popular enough in Europe to sell out almost every performance. In 1989 Becker joined David Lee Roth's solo band, having released his first solo album titled Perpetual Burn in 1988, while Friedman joined Megadeth in 1990. He has since released the albums Perspective, Collection and Triumphant Hearts, as well as three albums of demos, entitled The Raspberry Jams, The Blackberry Jams and The Strawberry Jams.

=== Amyotrophic lateral sclerosis diagnosis ===
In 1989, Becker joined David Lee Roth's solo band to work on his third album A Little Ain't Enough, replacing Steve Vai, who left the band to record and tour with Whitesnake. While preparing for the album, Becker began to feel what he called a "lazy limp" in his left leg. He was soon diagnosed with amyotrophic lateral sclerosis (ALS; Lou Gehrig's disease) and was given three to five years to live. He finished the recording using lighter gauge guitar strings and other techniques, which made it easier for him to play with his weakening hands. Although he managed to finish the album, he did not join the supporting tour due to his inability to perform on stage; former Lizzy Borden guitarist Joe Holmes took Becker's place on tour.

His ALS gradually robbed him of his ability to play guitar, to walk, and eventually his ability to speak. He now communicates with his eyes via a system developed by his father. Due to the nature of the disease, he remains mentally sharp and, with the aid of a computer, continues composing. In the back of the Perspective CD case, Becker states "I have Amyotrophic Lateral Sclerosis. It has crippled my body and speech, but not my mind." His medical condition has remained stable since 1997. In 2003, Becker posted on his website that he was feeling better and had gained some weight, while the folder for his 2008 album Collection also mentions an upcoming book.

=== Perspective and Raspberry Jams ===
In 1996, Becker released an album called Perspective, an instrumental album composed by him (with the exception of Bob Dylan's song "Meet Me in the Morning"). The writing of the music had been started before ALS completely disabled his abilities. By using guitar, and, later, when he was unable to use both hands, a keyboard, he continued to compose while his disease worsened. However, when Becker could no longer even play the keyboard, his friend and music producer Mike Bemesderfer helped him with a music-composing computer program that reads movements of his head and eyes, enabling Becker to continue to compose after he lost control of the rest of his body.

Three years later, Becker released Raspberry Jams (1999) and Blackberry Jams (2003); the first contained various unreleased demo tracks, and the latter contained demo tracks and alternate versions of songs that were later reworked and published on other albums.

Two tribute albums to Jason Becker have been released - Warmth in the Wilderness: A Tribute to Jason Becker (2001) and Warmth in the Wilderness Vol.II: A Tribute to Jason Becker (2002). Both feature notable guitarists such as Steve Vai, Paul Gilbert, Marty Friedman, Joe Becker, Steve Morse, Jeff Watson, Patrick Rondat, Chris Poland, Ron "Bumblefoot" Thal Rusty Cooley, and Mattias Eklundh. The album profits were sent to Becker to help him with his medical finances.

=== Collection ===
On November 4, 2008, Shrapnel Records released a new Becker album entitled Collection. The album includes three new songs in addition to some older recordings (some previously unreleased) and features Marty Friedman, Greg Howe, Joe Satriani, Michael Lee Firkins, Steve Vai, and Steve Hunter.

=== Boy Meets Guitar ===
On August 20, 2010, Becker declared that he was considering releasing an album of music he recorded when he was in his teenage years. He released this album, titled Boy Meets Guitar, in 2012.

=== Triumphant Hearts ===
In October 2016, Becker launched a campaign to fund an album, which was initially estimated for release in July 2017. The campaign raised more than $100,000. The album, Triumphant Hearts, was released on December 7, 2018.

== Musical style ==
Considered a virtuoso guitarist and one of the top players of his time, Becker studied the works of violinist Niccolò Paganini and was a playing partner with Marty Friedman. He later arranged Paganini's 5th Caprice, performing it during an instructional guitar video. Becker's compositions often include high speed scalar and arpeggio passages—trademarks of his shred style of guitar playing. Often incorporating advanced techniques such as sweep picking, alternate picking, artificial harmonic accenting, tapping and hybrid picking, he was among the leaders of the field during the technical shred guitar and neoclassical metal trend of the mid to late 1980s and is still respected and honored by his musician peers today. The song "Serrana" appearing in the album Perspective, is an example of his sweep-picking skills. He demonstrated the arpeggio sequence during a clinic at the Atlanta Institute of Music. A video of this performance first appeared on his Hot Licks guitar instructional video.

== Influence on other guitarists ==
Many guitarists cite Becker's playing as an influence, including Nita Strauss, Guthrie Govan, Herman Li, Chris Broderick, and Daniel Mongrain, among others.

== In media ==
Becker has appeared on many magazine covers throughout his career, including the February 1991 issue of Guitar for the Practicing Musician along with Jim Martin of Faith No More, the June 1991 issue of Young Guitar, and the July 2012 issue of Guitar Player, among others. He was also extensively interviewed for the 2017 book, Shredders!: The Oral History Of Speed Guitar (And More), by author Greg Prato.

== Equipment ==
Becker's first guitar was a Franciscan acoustic. Prior to joining Cacophony in 1987, Becker worked his way through the Franciscan, a Takamine acoustic, a Fender Musicmaster, and finally, a black "Dan Smith" era Fender Stratocaster (likely a 1982 or 1983 model) with a DiMarzio Steve Morse humbucker in the bridge (seen in the "Black Star" video, c. 1986). On his message board, Becker said "I recorded SMS [Speed Metal Symphony] with my Strat."

For his next guitar, Becker said on his message board "Mike Varney got Hurricane to endorse us after we recorded Speed Metal Symphony. I liked how they were like Strats, only beefier."

On Perpetual Burn, Becker said on his message board: "I used my white and black Hurricane guitar for everything. For clean tone I went direct. For dirty tone I used a 100 Watt Marshall with a Boss Super Overdrive pedal."

The Moridira Hurricane guitar he used is called a Limited Edition LTD.2 model, believed to be made in Japan. (It is not a Hurricane EX series, which appears to be lower quality.) His LTD.2 was a "strat copy", but with a HSS pickup setup, a 24-fret rosewood fingerboard, and unique Floyd Rose where you do not have to cut the strings. For pickups, Becker said on his message board: "I just used the stock pickups it came with." The pickups were Japanese-made pickups.

While Becker is pictured with a blue Hurricane guitar on the cover of Perpetual Burn, he did not use this blue guitar on the album. Differences on this guitar from his first Hurricane include DiMarzio pickups, a maple fretboard, and 24 frets. (Marty Friedman recorded the whammy parts of his song "Dragon Mistress" using Becker's blue Hurricane, one of the rare times Marty has recorded whammy work.)

For the second Cacophony album, Becker switched over to Carvin gear, utilizing 2 DC Series models, one in a trans blue finish with flamed maple top, and another one in a solid burgundy finish (This is the guitar seen in the famous "Yo Yo" video from the 1989 Japan tour with Cacophony). Both have double cutaway bodies, Kahler locking tremolo systems, six in line machine heads and two Carvin humbucker pickups. He used these up until he was diagnosed with ALS in 1989.

During the sessions for A Little Ain't Enough, Becker used various Carvin, Ibanez, ESP and Valley Arts guitars, as well as a Les Paul on some tracks and a Gibson acoustic for select things. Becker has also been pictured with a few Hamer superstrats as well. From 1989 to 1991, Becker used various guitars, most notably a Peavey custom model with the numbered fretboard markers. Also used were an Ibanez Custom Shop guitar (probably based on an RG), a custom from Performance Guitars, a couple of various unknown Strat style guitars and a black Hurricane with three single coil pickups.

Becker has allowed Paradise Guitars USA to release a Jason Becker signature guitar. It is similar in appearance to the numbered Peavey, but with a different headstock shape.

Becker used various types of amplifiers in his music. Before joining Cacophony, he used a small Peavey Studio Pro 40 with the older style Peavey vertical silver stripes on the grille cloth. During his early days Becker was also seen with a red Marshall JCM800 head and 4x12 cabinet.

For the first Cacophony album, Becker used an ADA MP1 preamp. He recorded Perpetual Burn with a borrowed 1970s Marshall half stack and a BOSS Super Overdrive and Cacophony's second album was recorded with a Carvin X100B stack.

For the David Lee Roth album A Little Ain't Enough, Becker used "eight different Marshall amps." He also used the SX300H head at some point during that era. After Cacophony, Becker used various amps, including a "Fender M80", an unknown Marshall amp, an ADA preamp and possibly the aforementioned Peavey combo.

Becker typically used Dean Markley and SIT strings.

=== Paradise Guitar ===
In 2008 Paradise Guitars worked with Becker to design a Jason Becker signature guitar. The design is based on the Peavey with colored number fret inlays. Features include an alder body, maple neck with steel 2-way truss rod, maple 16" radius fingerboard, 24 jumbo thin frets with colored number fret marker inlays, black Floyd Rose Pro Style floating Tremolo with Floyd Rose Tremolo stop, Sperzel red satin tuners, 14-degree tilt-back headstock with black Paradise logo and matching tremolo and electronics plates. The pickups are DiMarzio pickups; a PAF Pro-Custom in the neck colored yellow and red, a DP116 HS-2 in the middle colored green, and a Tone Zone-Custom in the bridge colored pink and blue. These colored pickups complement the colored inlays and seem to give the guitar a rainbow effect. There is also a red five-way switch and purple 1–11 volume knob.

=== Kiesel/Carvin Tribute Guitars ===
In 2012, Carvin worked with Becker to design the JB200C Jason Becker Tribute, a guitar that is modeled after the original DC200 guitar he used toward the latter part of his career.

In 2015, Kiesel Guitars, which took over Carvin's guitar manufacturing, worked with Becker to release a second tribute model, called the JB24 "Numbers" guitar. It is the third incarnation of his "Numbers" guitar, previously released by Peavey and Paradise guitars.

For the official launch of Becker's signature Seymour Duncan Perpetual Burn Humbucker and the Carvin JB24 numbers guitar, Danny Young was chosen as the guitarist for both performances due to his stylistic resemblance to Becker and Paganini. The Perpetual Burn performance was played on the Carvin JB200C.

== Documentary film ==
A feature-length documentary film about Becker entitled Jason Becker: Not Dead Yet, was released in 2012. The film includes interviews with Becker, his family and friends, and the various musicians he has worked with, including Marty Friedman, Steve Vai, Joe Satriani, Richie Kotzen, and Steve Hunter.

== Discography ==
Cacophony

- Speed Metal Symphony (1987)
- Go Off! (1989)

Marty Friedman

- Dragon's Kiss (1988)
- Inferno (2014)

Solo

- Perpetual Burn (1988)
- Perspective (1996)
- The Raspberry Jams (1999)
- The Blackberry Jams (2003)
- Collection (2008)
- Boy Meets Guitar, Vol. 1 of the Youngster Tapes (2012)
- Triumphant Hearts (2018)
- The Strawberry Jams (2026)

David Lee Roth

- A Little Ain't Enough (1991)

Joe Becker

- Short Stories (2005)

Other works

- Richie Kotzen (1989, producer)
- Daydream by the Hudson on Steve Hunter's 2013 The Manhattan Blues Project

Compilations

- Guitar Masters, 1989, Roadrunner Records
- Metal Guitars – High Voltage Instrumentals,1998, Disky Communications
- Shrapnel's Super Shredders: Neoclassical, 2009, Shrapnel
- This is Shredding, Vol. 1, 2009, Shrapnel
- This is Shredding, Vol. 2, 2009, Shrapnel

Tribute

- Warmth in the Wilderness: A Tribute to Jason Becker, 2001, Lion Music
- Warmth in Wilderness 2: Tribute Jason Becker, 2002, Lion Music
- Jason Becker's Not Dead Yet! (Live in Haarlem), 2012, Primal Events

Instructional

- Hot Licks – The Legendary Guitar of Jason Becker
- In The Style Of Jason Becker, feat. Max Dible. DC Music School

Films

- Jason Becker: Not Dead Yet (2012)
- One Track Heart: The Story of Krishna Das (2012)
