= Cacophony (band) =

American heavy metal band

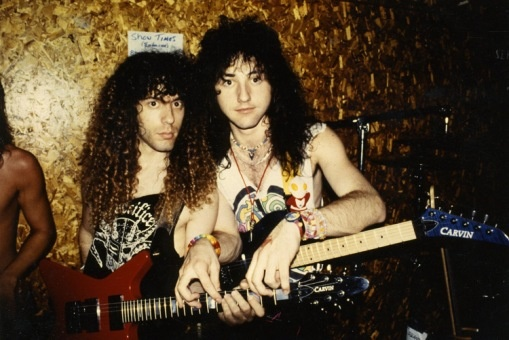
- Cacophony founders Marty Friedman and Jason Becker in 1989

Background information
- Origin: San Francisco, California, U.S.
- Genres: Heavy metal; speed metal; neoclassical metal
- Years active: 1986–1989
- Label: Shrapnel
- Past members: Peter Marrino; Dan Bryant; Marty Friedman; Jason Becker; Atma Anur; Deen Castronovo; Kenny Stavropoulos; Jimmy O'Shea; Craig Swain

Cacophony was an American heavy metal band formed in 1986 by guitarists Marty Friedman and Jason Becker, and signed to Shrapnel Records. They released two studio albums and remained active until 1989, after which both guitarists forged their own solo careers and joined other bands.

Steve Huey of AllMusic described the band's sound as "highly technical neo-classical metal".

== History ==
The two albums released by Cacophony, Speed Metal Symphony (1987) and Go Off! (1989), were showpieces of the kind of highly technical playing typical of the 1980s shred era, with songs featuring fast tempos, melodic solos, exotic neoclassical scales and dual guitar harmonizations. Several of the tracks were entirely instrumental, which prominently demonstrated Friedman and Becker's renowned technical skills. In a 2009 article by Guitar World magazine, Speed Metal Symphony was ranked ninth in a list of all-time top ten shred albums.

Both Friedman and Becker released their own solo albums—Dragon's Kiss and Perpetual Burn, respectively—in 1988, before the release of Go Off! Friedman later joined the thrash metal band Megadeth in 1990, remaining with them for nine years as well as releasing several more solo albums, while Becker enjoyed a short stint in David Lee Roth's solo band from 1989 to 1991. Becker's time with Roth was abruptly cut short due to an onset of amyotrophic lateral sclerosis, a degenerative disease that rendered him completely unable to play and, soon afterwards, move or speak.

== Band members ==
- Peter Marrino – vocals
- Dan Bryant – vocals (last tour only)
- Marty Friedman – guitar
- Jason Becker – guitar
- Atma Anur – drums
- Deen Castronovo – drums
- Kenny Stavropoulos – drums (live only)
- Jimmy O'Shea – bass, backing vocals
- Craig Swain – bass, backing vocals (live only)

== Discography ==
- 1987: Speed Metal Symphony
- 1989: Go Off!
