= Mike Varney =

American record producer

- Genres: Instrumental rock, hard rock, progressive metal, speed metal, blues rock, blues, jazz, jazz fusion, heavy metal
- Occupation: Record producer
- Years active: 1980–present
- Labels: Shrapnel, Tone Center, Blues Bureau, Magna Carta
- Formerly of: The Nuns
- Website: shrapnelrecords.com

Michael Varney (born 1958) is an American record producer and music publisher. He is the founder of the Shrapnel Label Group, which includes Shrapnel Records, Tone Center Records, and Blues Bureau International. He also owns 50% of Magna Carta Records, a New York–based label. Varney is often credited with popularizing the mid-1980s shred guitar boom, and has continuously specialized in producing musicians within the genres of instrumental rock, hard rock, jazz, jazz fusion, blues, blues-rock, progressive metal, and speed metal.

== Early life ==
Mike Varney grew up in Novato, California, in the San Francisco Bay Area. Before forming Shrapnel Records, Varney played extensively with the pre-punk band, The Nuns. The Nuns were one of the most successful bands in the Bay Area at that time, regularly selling out at the local venues and clubs. He co-wrote and performed "Rock Justice" along with Jefferson Airplane and Jefferson Starship's Marty Balin, released by EMI in 1980. Varney also led his band, Cinema, which received wide recognition in the San Francisco Bay Area. He was known for searing lead guitar runs performed on his collection of Gibson SG guitars.

== Career ==
=== Shrapnel Records ===
Shrapnel Records was founded in 1980 by Mike Varney at the age of 22. It was the first record company in the U.S. strictly dedicated to heavy metal. Shrapnel was at the forefront of the neo-classical electric guitar and shred movements. Shrapnel Records was the first label to bring world attention to guitarists such as Yngwie Malmsteen (Steeler), Marty Friedman, Jason Becker, Paul Gilbert, Racer X, Tony MacAlpine, Vinnie Moore, Greg Howe, Richie Kotzen, John5, and many others. Today Shrapnel continues to record guitarists and has also returned to his metal roots by releasing some classic metal and hard rock records due to a resurgence in interest.

=== Guitar Player's Spotlight column ===
Mike Varney began his "Spotlight" column in Guitar Player magazine in 1982 as a vehicle for discovering talent among the magazine's audience. His monthly column featured many guitarists who sent in demos to showcase their abilities. Several players who were featured received opportunities to record with Shrapnel Records.

=== Blues Bureau International ===
Blues Bureau International, founded in 1991, is a label that has focused its attention on the blues-rock genre. Through the years the label has recorded many artists including Pat Travers, Rick Derringer, Eric Gales, Scott Henderson's solo records as well as records from his group "Tribal Tech", Glenn Hughes, Marc Ford, Chris Duarte, Neal Schon, The Outlaws, Joe Louis Walker, etc. The label continues to record artists in the electric blues style.

=== Tone Center ===
Tone Center Records, founded in 1997, is an independent record company owned by Varney, dedicated to recording high-level jazz, jazz/rock and fusion music. The roster is made up of some of the most well-known names in the instrumental jazz/rock/fusion world. The label's records include performances by Frank Gambale, Eric Johnson, Warren Haynes, Steve Morse, Victor Wooten and Mike Stern.

== Partial list of artists who have appeared on releases on Varney's record labels ==
=== Shrapnel Records ===
- Apocrypha
- Artension
- Brides of Destruction
- Cacophony
- Chastain
- Craig Goldy
- Deen Castronovo
- Derek Taylor
- George Lynch
- Glenn Hughes
- Great White
- Greg Howe
- Haji's Kitchen
- Jake E. Lee
- James Murphy
- Jason Becker
- Jeff Watson
- Jizzy Pearl
- Joey Tafolla
- John5
- Johnny Hiland
- John West
- L.A. Guns
- Marc Rizzo
- Marty Friedman
- Michael Lee Firkins
- Michael Schenker Group
- Michelle Meldrum
- Nicole Couch
- Paul Gilbert
- Racer X
- Richie Kotzen
- Timelord
- Tony Fredianelli
- Tony MacAlpine
- UFO
- Vicious Rumors
- Vinnie Moore
- Vitalij Kuprij
- War & Peace
- Winger
- Yngwie Malmsteen

=== Tone Center Records ===
- Adam Rogers
- Anthony Jackson
- Bill Connors
- Bill Frisell
- Bireli Lagrene
- Brett Garsed
- Chris Duarte
- Craig Erickson
- Dennis Chambers
- Eric Johnson
- Frank Gambale
- Gary Willis
- Jack DeJohnette
- Jimmy Haslip
- Jimmy Herring
- John Abercrombie
- John Patitucci
- John Scofield
- Kai Eckhardt
- Larry Coryell
- Mike Stern
- OHM
- Pat Martino
- Rob Wasserman
- Robben Ford
- Ron Keel
- Scott Henderson
- Scott Kinsey
- Simon Phillips
- Steve Bailey
- Steve Khan
- Steve Lukather
- Steve Marcus
- Steve Morse
- Steve Smith
- Stuart Hamm
- TJ Helmerich
- T Lavitz
- Tom Coster
- Victor Wooten
- Vinnie Colaiuta
- Walter Trout
- Warren Haynes

=== Blues Bureau Records ===
- Blindside Blues Band
- Chris Cobb
- Craig Erickson
- Eric Gales
- Glenn Hughes
- Joe Louis Walker
- Johnny Nitro
- Jon Butcher
- Leslie West
- Marc Ford
- Neal Schon
- Pat Travers
- Paul Gilbert
- Richie Kotzen
- Rick Derringer
- Scott Henderson
- The Outlaws
- Tony Spinner

=== Magna Carta Records ===
- Age of Nemesis
- Alex Skolnick
- Andy West
- Billy Sheehan
- Bozzio Levin Stevens
- Caliban
- Clinton Administration
- David Lee Roth
- Derek Sherinian
- Doug Pinnick
- Enchant
- Ethan Brosh
- Explorers Club
- Fareed Haque
- Ice Age
- James LaBrie
- Jordan Rudess
- Kansas
- Khallice
- Liquid Tension Experiment
- Liquid Trio Experiment
- Magellan
- Martone
- Michael Lee Firkins
- Mike Portnoy
- Niacin
- OHMphrey
- Ozric Tentacles
- Points North
- Robert Berry
- Robert Walter
- Royal Hunt
- Shadow Gallery
- Steve Morse
- Steve Stevens
- Stripsearch
- Tempest
- Terry Bozzio
- Tiles
- Tony Hymas
- Tony Levin
- World Trade
