= Shrapnel Records =

American record label

- Parent company: Sony Music Entertainment
- Founded: 1980
- Founder: Mike Varney
- Distributor(s): The Orchard
- Genre: Heavy metal; speed metal; neoclassical metal; hard rock; instrumental rock
- Country of origin: United States
- Location: Novato, California
- Official website: shrapnelrecords.com

Shrapnel Records is an American record label group founded by record producer Mike Varney. The group principally uses the Shrapnel Records record label, a guitar-oriented label which features shred guitar, hard rock, metal and progressive metal. In the 1990s, he also started the Tone Center Records and Blues Bureau International sublabels to promote fusion and blues.

Blues Bureau artists include Rick Derringer, Eric Gales, Marc Ford, Chris Duarte, Leslie West and Pat Travers.

Tone Center Records grew out of Varney's admiration for the jazz fusion of the 1970s and groups such as The Tony Williams Lifetime, Mahavishnu Orchestra, Return to Forever, and Soft Machine. Tone Center's early releases included drummer Steve Smith and guitarists Larry Coryell, Frank Gambale, and Scott Henderson.

== History ==
Guitarist Marty Friedman (formerly of Megadeth and Cacophony), one of the label's most successful artists, first appeared on the album Unsung Guitar Heroes II in 1980 with the band Vixen. Vixen would later change their name to Hawaii and release the album One Nation Underground for Shrapnel. In 1981, a friend gave Mike Varney a tape featuring a 17-year-old Swedish guitarist named Yngwie Malmsteen. A year later, Malmsteen wrote to the label stating that he wanted to export his music to America. Varney, who started writing a column called "Spotlight" for Guitar Player magazine in 1982, featured Malmsteen in his February 1983 column. The record executive flew Yngwie to California and set him up with vocalist Ron Keel's new band called Steeler. Steeler's self-titled album became a best selling release for Shrapnel Records.

Blues Bureau was created as a subsidiary in 1992, as an American guitar oriented, blues, and blues rock independent record label.

The label was acquired by The Orchard, subsidiary of Sony Music Entertainment, in November 2015.

== Related labels ==
In 1989, Mike Varney co-founded progressive rock/metal label Magna Carta Records.

Tone Center Records a jazz oriented label featuring fusion guitar as well as a number of jazz tributes.

== Notable releases ==
=== Shrapnel Records ===
#	Artist	Title	Year	Note
SH-1001	Unsung Guitar Heroes (V.A.)	U.S. Metal Vol. 1	1982	
SH-1002	Unsung Guitar Heroes (V.A.)	U.S. Metal Vol. 2	1982	feat. Michael Angelo Batio and Marty Friedman
SH-1003	Wild Dogs	Wild Dogs	1983	feat. Deen Castronovo
SH-1004	Exciter	Heavy Metal Maniac	1983	
SH-1007	Steeler	Steeler	1983	feat. Yngwie Malmsteen
SH-1008	Culprit	Guilty as Charged	1983	
SH-1009	Hawaii	One Nation Underground	1983	
SH-1013	Unsung Guitar Heroes (V.A.)	U.S. Metal Vol. 4	1984	feat. Shawn Lane
SH-1014	Keel	Lay Down the Law	1984	
SH-1018	Chastain	Mystery of Illusion	1985	
SH-1019	London	Non-Stop Rock	1985	
SH-1020	Vicious Rumors	Soldiers of the Night	1985	
SH-1021	Tony MacAlpine	Edge of Insanity	1986	
SH-1022	Fifth Angel	Fifth Angel	1986	
SH-1023	Racer X	Street Lethal	1986	
SH-1024	Chastain	Ruler of the Wasteland	1986	
SH-1027	Vinnie Moore	Mind's Eye	1986	
SH-1028	MacAlpine, Aldridge, Rock, Sarzo	Project: Driver	1986	
SH-1030	Joey Tafolla	Out of the Sun	1987	
SH-1031	Cacophony	Speed Metal Symphony	1987	
SH-1032	Racer X	Second Heat	1987	
SH-1033	Vicious Rumors	Digital Dictator	1988	
SH-1035	Marty Friedman	Dragon's Kiss	1988	
SH-1036	Jason Becker	Perpetual Burn	1988	
SH-1037	Greg Howe	Greg Howe	1988	
SH-1038	Racer X	Extreme Volume Live	1988	
SH-1040	Cacophony	Go Off!	1988	
SH-1042	Richie Kotzen	Richie Kotzen	1989	
SH-1043	Phantom Blue	Phantom Blue	1989	
SH-1044	Howe II	High Gear	1989	
SH-1045	Michael Lee Firkins	Michael Lee Firkins	1990	

=== Blues Bureau ===
- Eric Gales - Relentless (2010)
- Marc Ford - Weary and Wired(2007)
- Joe Louis Walker - New Direction (2004)
- Leslie West - Got Blooze (2005)
- Chris Duarte - Blue Velocity (2007)
- Jimi Kidd/Paul Gilbert - Raw Blues Power (2001)
- Glenn Hughes - Blues L.A. Authority Volume II (1992–93)
- Rick Derringer - Back to the Blues (1993)
- Pat Travers - Just A Touch (1993)
- Outlaws - Hittin' The Road Live! (1993)
- Outlaws - Diablo Canyon (1994)
- Jon Butcher - Positively the Blues (1995)
- Marc Ford & The Neptune Blues Club - Marc Ford & The Neptune Blues Club (2008)

== See also ==
- List of record labels
