= Marty Friedman =

American guitarist (born 1962)

- Friedman in 2026

Background information
- Born: December 8, 1962 (age 63); Washington, D.C., U.S.
- Genres: Heavy metal; thrash metal; speed metal; hard rock; instrumental rock; neoclassical metal
- Occupation: Musician
- Instrument: Guitar
- Years active: 1981–present
- Labels: Avex Trax; Gokukara; Shrapnel; Prosthetic; Universal; EMI
- Formerly of: Hawaii; Cacophony; Megadeth
- Spouse: Hiyori Okuda (m. 2012)
- Website: martyfriedman.com

Martin Adam Friedman (Japanese: マーティン・アダム・フリードマン, Hepburn: Mātin Adamu Furīdoman) is an American guitarist, best known for his tenure as the lead guitarist of thrash metal band Megadeth from 1990 to 2000. He is also known for playing alongside Jason Becker in Cacophony from 1986 until 1989, as well as his 13 solo albums and tours. Friedman has resided in Tokyo since 2003, where he has appeared on over 700 Japanese television programs such as Rock Fujiyama, Hebimeta-san, Kōhaku Uta Gassen and Jukebox English. He has released albums with several record labels, including Avex Trax, Universal, EMI, Prosthetic, and Shrapnel Records.

== Early career (1982–1989) ==
Friedman took up the guitar at the age of 14 after attending a Kiss concert, and is largely self-taught. He rushed to form a band and began playing original songs because originals are easier to play than covers. "Because", he says, "even if you screw up, you just claim that the song is written like that and no one can challenge you." The mother of one of Friedman's friends ran an event center with a two-level stage, and Friedman and his friends used it as a rehearsal space. Word quickly spread about their band, and, since they were in a rural area, people would come from miles around to socialize and listen to music. Rehearsals soon became live shows. Friedman formed and played lead guitar in several other bands, including Deuce, Hawaii (which had previously been called Vixen), and notably Cacophony. Cacophony featured neoclassical metal elements and synchronized twin guitar harmonies and counterpoints shared with guitarist Jason Becker. He played guitar on the 1989 album In Your Face by Christian rock band Shout. In 1988, he recorded demos for Jet Red that eventually were released as bonus tracks on the 2009 Jet Red release "Flight Plan". In August 1988, he released his first solo album, Dragon's Kiss.

== Megadeth (1990–2000, 2023) ==
When Cacophony disbanded in 1989, Friedman auditioned for the thrash metal band Megadeth after a tip from his friend Bob Nalbandian. Friedman officially joined Megadeth in February 1990. Friedman's audition can be seen on the Megadeth DVD Arsenal of Megadeth. The first album he recorded with them was Rust in Peace, which was released on September 24, 1990. Rust in Peace was certified platinum by the RIAA in 1994 and was nominated for the Best Metal Performance Grammy at the 33rd Grammy Awards.

Friedman further developed his style of playing exotic scale solos from the Cacophony era, and integrated it into the music of Megadeth. In July 1992, Megadeth released Countdown to Extinction, which was a more commercial album, aimed at a wider audience, and sold double platinum. Friedman played on Megadeth's further releases Youthanasia (1994), Cryptic Writings (1997), and Risk (1999). Friedman announced his departure from Megadeth in December 1999. His last show with the band was on January 9, 2000, at 4th & B in San Diego.

In his memoir, Dreaming Japanese, Friedman discussed experiencing severe panic attacks during his final months with the band. After informing his bandmates of his decision to leave, he began suffering from debilitating anxiety that impacted him both mentally and physically. To cope, he relied on antidepressants, muscle relaxers, and a routine of protein-heavy meals and long hot baths. Despite his condition, Friedman maintained high performance standards on stage, which led to tensions with bandmates and staff who were unaware of the extent of his struggles. Following his departure, he spent months recovering and reflecting on this challenging period.

Friedman later stated that he got tired of "holding the flag" for traditional metal and felt that he could not evolve as a musician. In an interview with Ultimate-Guitar.com in March 2007, Friedman claimed that he wanted Megadeth to move towards a more aggressive sound and that he'd rather have been playing straight pop music than the pop-influenced metal Megadeth was playing at the time. During Friedman's time in the band, they sold over ten million albums worldwide.

During his time in Megadeth, Friedman released three solo albums between 1992 and 1996, which featured Megadeth bandmate Nick Menza on drums.

Friedman reunited with Megadeth for the songs "Countdown to Extinction", "Tornado of Souls" and "Symphony of Destruction" at the Nippon Budokan in Tokyo on February 27, 2023.

Friedman reunited with Megadeth again at Wacken Open Air for the songs "Trust", "Tornado of Souls", "Symphony of Destruction" and "Holy Wars... The Punishment Due" on August 4, 2023.

== In Japan and recent work (2000–present) ==
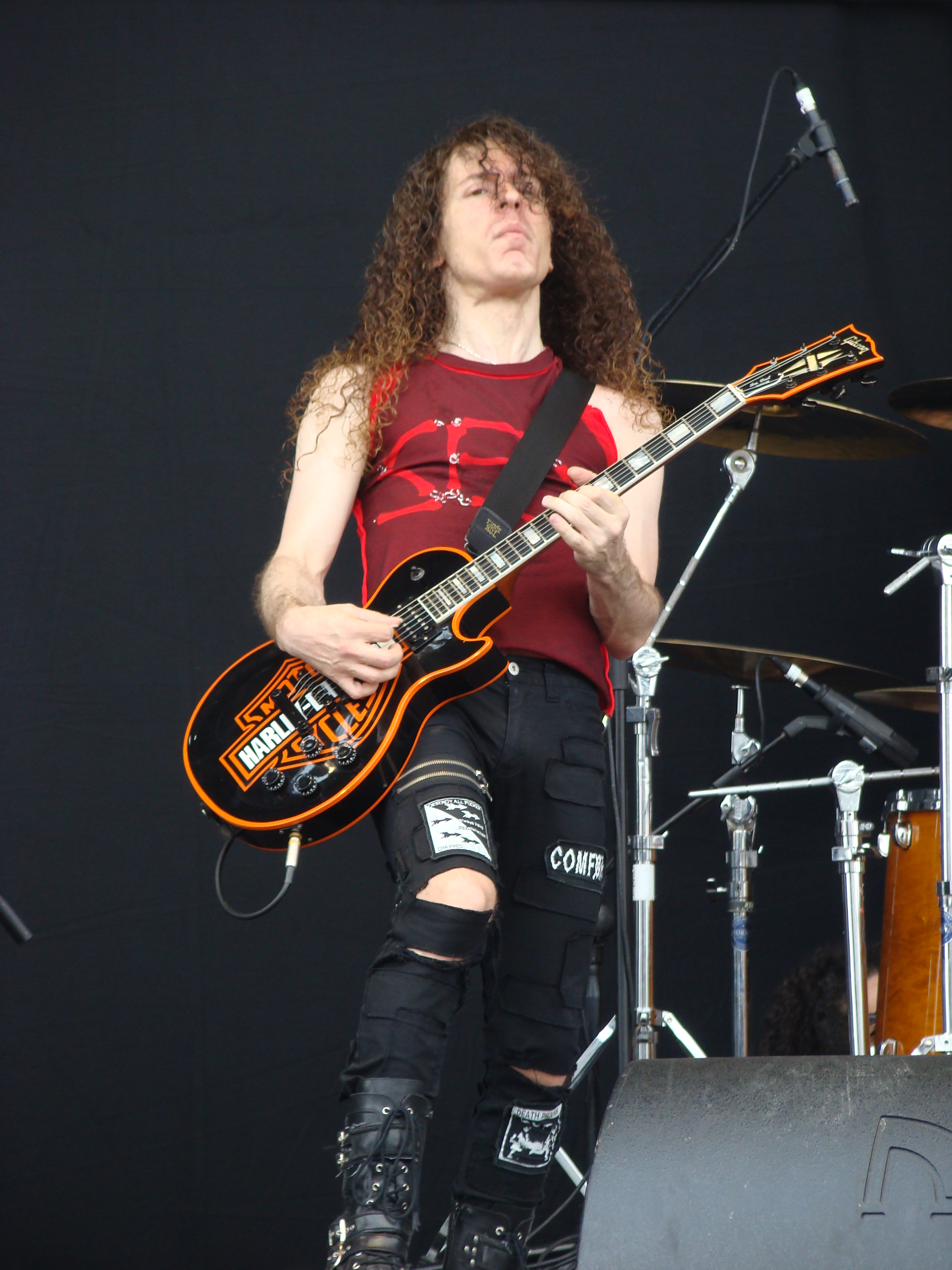
Friedman at Gods of Metal 2009

Friedman appeared on the Tourniquet albums Where Moth and Rust Destroy (2003) and Antiseptic Bloodbath (2012), and Tourniquet drummer Ted Kirkpatrick's solo album Onward to Freedom.

In 2003, Friedman collaborated with Nanase Aikawa on her third mini album R.U.O.K. In 2021 he toured with Aikawa on her 25th anniversary concert tour.

In 2009, Friedman collaborated with Emma Gelotte and Tinna Karlsdotter from "All Ends" as the lead guitarist for the song "With Me", which was featured in the game, Sonic and the Black Knight. In 2010, Friedman launched a record label under Avex Group, called Gokukara Records. In February 2010, during C. J. Ramone's Japan tour, he made a guest appearance on guitar for "California Sun", a cover song previously released by The Ramones on their 1977 album, Leave Home.

In 2011, Friedman collaborated with Japanese idol group Momoiro Clover Z, providing guitar for their song "Mōretsu Uchū Kōkyōkyoku Dai 7 Gakushō "Mugen no Ai"", which would become a hit in 2012.

In 2011, Friedman worked with Ayanocozey Show to make the song SAMURAI STRONG STYLE, theme of the Tokusatsu movie Kamen Rider × Kamen Rider Fourze & OOO: Movie War Mega Max. The catchphrase for the movie is "In Winter 2011, Movie War Will Evolve" (2011年冬、MOVIE大戦が〈進化〉する, Nisenjūichinen Fuyu, Mūbī Taisen ga Shinka Suru). Friedman and Ayanocozey had previously worked together when they joined the Japanese promotional super-group FANTA, releasing the 2010 single "Fantastic Love". Friedman stood for the "F" in FANTA, Ayanocozey stood for the first "A", and the other members of the group made up the other letters.

Friedman recorded with Daniel Tompkins of Tesseract in Tompkins' band Skyharbor's debut album, Blinding White Noise. At the end of 2012, a full album containing heavy metal covers of Momoiro Clover Z's songs was also released by a band named "Metal Clone X". Although band members remained anonymous, Friedman was cited as label producer and arranger.

In 2013, Friedman released his first library of guitar loops on LoopArtists. Friedman recorded collections of clean-tone, high gain lead and rhythm guitar loops that are intended for use in a production and remix environment. Friedman has been doing concert tours for the Bravely Default original soundtrack in 2013 as well as the Budokan concert tours among others. In combination with these tours he also released his new album Inferno in 2014 which he toured across Europe going to places such as Norway, Poland, Netherlands and Germany.

In 2014, Friedman collaborated again with Momoiro Clover Z, providing the guitar track for their single "Moon Pride". The song was also used as the opening theme music for the television series Sailor Moon Crystal, which premiered in July that year.

In 2018, he collaborated with Man with a Mission's Jean-Ken Johnny, KenKen, and Kōji Fujimoto for the song "The Perfect World", which was used as main theme for the Netflix original anime series B: The Beginning.

In 2021, he was inducted into The Metal Hall of Fame alongside Triumph, legacy members of Kiss and Iron Maiden, Stryper, and photographer Mark Weiss.

=== Television ===
Friedman appears on Japanese television and is also a contributing columnist to Japanese music magazines and national newspapers. Speaking Japanese, he became a regular member of the cast of TXN's musical TV program Hebimeta-san (ヘビメタさん) (anglicized as "Mr. Heavy-Metal") with Japanese idol Yoko Kumada until the show came to an end in 2005. Friedman had his own heavy metal TV program called Rock Fujiyama alongside Shelly, Ken Ayugai (Kenny Guy), Yorimasa Hisatake (Rock Ninja Yorimasa) and ex-Scanch member Rolly Teranishi from April 2006 until March 2007. From November till December 2005, he toured with singer Ami Suzuki on her "Suzuki Ami Around the World" live house tour, which took place in Tokyo, Osaka and Nagoya. Friedman was featured on Jukebox, a television program in which Friedman and two Japanese people translate the lyrics of various English songs into understandable Japanese. He has also made guest appearances on the television programs Eigo de Shabera Night and Tamori Club. In 2008, Friedman played the role of Paul Weinberg, an English language teacher, in Isshin Inudo's Gou-Gou Datte Neko de Aru.

Friedman was a guest star in the Adult Swim original Metalocalypse by playing driving teacher Mr. Gojira. He has appeared on Cool Japan several times as a music expert.

In 2009, Friedman appeared on The Quiz Show, a Japanese TV drama starring Sho Sakurai as a guest professor. In January 2014, Friedman took part in New Japan Pro-Wrestling's Wrestle Kingdom 8 in Tokyo Dome event, playing Hiroshi Tanahashi to the arena.

In 2024, Friedman performed on 2024最美的夜 bilibili跨年晚会, a yearly new year's celebration show hosted by Chinese streaming platform Bilibili alongside Ichika Nito and Marcin Patrzalek.

On August 7, 2025, Friedman provided the guitar melody for the fictional rock band Hayashi (stylized as HAYASii)'s song "Hunting Soul" in the anime Dandadan.

== Personal life ==
Friedman is of Jewish descent. He lives in the Shinjuku area of Tokyo.

Shortly after the 2011 Tōhoku earthquake and tsunami, Friedman began auctioning off a great variety of his musical equipment and paraphernalia that he used as a member of Megadeth and Cacophony, including some of the earliest productions of Jackson Kelly guitars and his signature Carvin V220.

In December 2012, Friedman married Japanese cellist Hiyori Okuda in Yokohama.

In 2018, Friedman confirmed that his hair is genuinely curly but hates it; he prefers to have it straight.

== Guitar technique ==
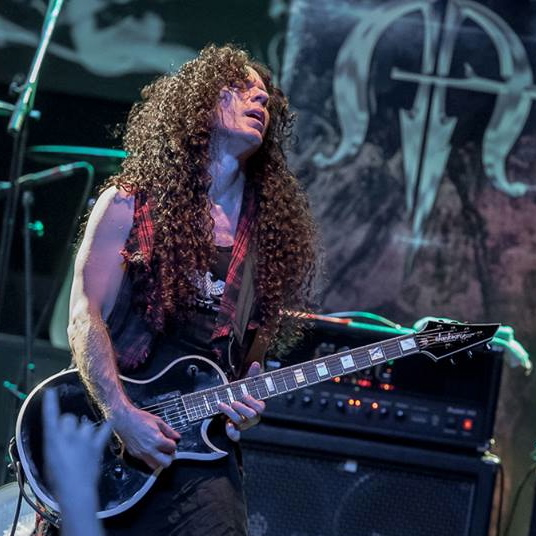
Friedman performing with his Jackson signature guitar in 2016

Friedman is known for his improvisation and for fusing Eastern music with Western music and other styles, such as neoclassical, thrash metal and later progressive rock. When playing, he often uses arpeggiated chords and various customized scales and arpeggios, some of which relate to Asian (Chinese and Japanese), Middle Eastern and other exotic scales, which are different from the typical minor/major pentatonic and seven modes based on the Major scale.

As a right-handed guitarist, Friedman has an unorthodox picking technique; the angle in which his hand is clenched goes against the conventional palm mute frequently used by right-handed players in metal music. He also frequently utilizes upstrokes as opposed to downstrokes, especially on the B and high E strings. Rather than strictly picking from his elbow or wrist, Friedman will also pick moving his fingers—a technique known as "circle picking".

Friedman is critical of being called a shredder. He opined that the term is "a guy who plays fast meaningless shit all the time. Shredders are the guys in your friend's basement who play insanely fast, and it just looks so mind-blowing and amazingly cool with their fingers flying all around the neck, but if you close your eyes and actually listen, what you hear is a pile of shit. You all know what I'm talking about."

=== Amplifiers and effects ===
- Engl Signature Marty Friedman Inferno (current)
- Fractal Audio Axe-FX II processor (current)
- Engl Special Edition (former)
- Engl Powerball (2011 tour)
- Custom Audio Electronics CAE 3+ preamp (Countdown, Youthanasia albums and tours) (former)
- Soldano SLO-100 (custom rackmount with slave out and effects loop circa 1992, used in studio for both guitar and bass tracks)
- Bogner Triple Giant #11/25 (Rust in Peace album and tour) (former)
- Rocktron/Bradshaw RSB 11 controller
- Crate Blue Voodoo (as power amp, former)
- VHT 2150 power amp (former)
- Maxon AF-9 Auto Wah

== Discography ==
=== Cacophony ===
Date of release	Title	Label
1987	Speed Metal Symphony	Shrapnel Records
1989	Go Off!	Shrapnel Records

=== Megadeth ===
Date of release	Title	Label
September 24, 1990	Rust in Peace	Capitol Records
July 14, 1992	Countdown to Extinction	Capitol Records
October 31, 1994	Youthanasia	Capitol Records
July 18, 1995	Hidden Treasures (EP)	Capitol Records
June 17, 1997	Cryptic Writings	Capitol Records
August 31, 1999	Risk	Capitol Records

=== Tourniquet ===
Date of release	Title	Label
2003	Where Moth and Rust Destroy	Metal Blade Records
2012	Antiseptic Bloodbath	Pathogenic Records
2014	Onward to Freedom	Pathogenic Records

=== Enzo and the Glory Ensemble ===
Date of release	Title	Label
2015	In the Name of the Father	Underground Symphony Records
2017	In the Name of the Son	Rockshots Records

=== Solo ===
Date of release	Title	Label
1988	Dragon's Kiss	Shrapnel Records
1992	Scenes	Shrapnel Records
1994	Introduction	Shrapnel Records
1996	True Obsessions	Shrapnel Records
2003	Music for Speeding	Favored Nations
2006	Loudspeaker	Avex Trax
2007	Live in Europe	Avex Trax
2008	Future Addict	Avex Trax
2009	Tokyo Jukebox	Avex Trax
2010	Bad D.N.A.	Avex Trax
2011	Tokyo Jukebox 2	Avex Trax
2012	Metal Clone X (with Freddy Lim)	Avex Trax
2014	Metal Clone X vol.2: Louder Than Your Mother (with Freddy Lim)	Avex Trax
2014	Inferno	Prosthetic
2017	Wall of Sound	Prosthetic
2018	One Bad M.F. Live!!	Prosthetic
2021	Tokyo Jukebox 3	Avex Trax
2024	Drama	Frontiers Music

=== Guest appearances ===
Date of release	Title	Artist	Note
2009	Face to Faith: Sonic and the Black Knight Vocal Trax	Sega	Guitars on "With Me"
2016	Great Is Our Sin	Revocation	Guitar solo on "The Exaltation"
2020	Transitus	Ayreon	Guitar solo on "Message from Beyond"
2020	Open Source	Kiko Loureiro	Guest solo on "Imminent Threat"
2021	Hear and Dare	Yossi Sassi	Guest on "Mayim Mayim"
2023	Vox Popurrí, Vol. I	Dario Imaz	Guest solo on "Mil Destinos"
2023	The Call of the Void	Nita Strauss	Guest solo on "Surfacing"
2024	Quest	Antariksh	Guest solo on "Quest"
2026	Necropalace	Worm	Guitars on "Witchmoon: The Infernal Masquerade"

=== Compilations ===
Date of release	Title	Label	Note
2006	Kick Ass Rock	Sony Records Int'l	Collection of cover songs by Marty Friedman

Preceded by Jeff Young	Megadeth lead guitarist 1990–2000	Succeeded by Al Pitrelli
