= Larger Than Live =

Studio album / live album by Keel
- Released: September 1989
- Venue: The Roxy, West Hollywood, California
- Studio: Sound City Studios Van Nuys, California
- Genre: Hard rock, glam metal
- Length: 54:53
- Label: Gold Mountain/Gold Castle
- Producer: Ron Keel and Allen Isaacs

Keel chronology
Keel (1987)	Larger Than Live (1989)	Keel VI: Back in Action (1998)

Professional ratings
Review scores
Source	Rating
AllMusic	2/5 stars
Collector's Guide to Heavy Metal	6/10

Larger Than Live is the fifth studio album by American rock band Keel. It was released in 1989 on Gold Mountain Records. The album consists of six new studio tracks and six of the band's previous songs recorded live at The Roxy in West Hollywood, CA. It was also the only album to feature future Dio keyboardist Scott Warren and guitarist Tony Palamucci (as guitarist Marc Ferrari left the band due to creative and personal differences).

Following the filming of the music video for the song "Dreams Are Not Enough," lead vocalist/founder Ron Keel announced the disbandment of Keel.

== Track listing ==
Side one – studio

1. "Evil Wicked Mean & Nasty" (Ron Keel) – 4:21
2. "Riding High" (Dwain Miller, Kenny Chaisson, R. Keel, Scott Warren) – 3:24
3. "Die Fighting" (R. Keel) – 4:40
4. "Dreams Are Not Enough" (Phil Wolfe, R. Keel) – 4:16
5. "So Many Good Ways to Be Bad" (R. Keel, Steve Diamond) – 4:08
6. "Fool for a Pretty Face" (Jerry Shirley, Steve Marriott) – 4:18 (Humble Pie cover)

Side two – live

7. "Hard as Hell" (R. Keel) – 4:06
8. "Rock and Roll Animal" (Marc Ferrari) – 6:15
9. "Private Lies" (R. Keel) – 4:38
10. "Rock 'n Roll Outlaw" (Gary Anderson, Mick Cocks, Peter Wells) – 4:12 (Rose Tattoo cover)
11. "The Right to Rock" (Bryan Jay, Kenny Chaisson, Ferrari, R. Keel) – 6:06
12. "Cold Day in Hell" (R. Keel) – 4:29 (Steeler cover)

Tracks 1–6 are new studio tracks, tracks 7–12 are live recordings.

== Personnel ==
Band members

- Ron Keel – lead vocals, guitar, producer
- Tony "The Kid" Palamucci – guitars, backing vocals
- Bryan Jay – guitars, backing vocals (on tracks 7–12)
- Kenny Chaisson – bass, backing vocals
- Scott Warren – keyboards, piano, backing vocals
- Dwain Miller – drums, backing vocals

Additional musicians

- Jaime St. James, Kevin Dubrow – backing vocals on track 6
- Bryan Jenkins – backing vocals
- Paula Salvatore – harmony vocals on track 5

Production

- Allen Isaacs – producer, engineer on tracks 1–6
- Bryan Jenkins – engineer on tracks 1–6
- Jaimie Seyberth, John Falzarano, Ray Thompson – live recording of tracks 7–12
- Greg Fulginti – mastering
