= Keel (album) =

Studio album by Keel
- Released: June 1987
- Recorded: December 1986–February 1987
- Studios: Amigo Studios, Los Angeles
- Genres: Hard rock, glam metal
- Length: 38:00
- Label: Gold Mountain/MCA
- Producer: Michael Wagener

Keel chronology
The Final Frontier (1986)	Keel (1987)	Larger Than Live (1989)

Singles from Keel
- 1. "Somebody's Waiting" Released: 1987

Professional ratings
Review scores
Source	Rating
AllMusic	3/5 stars
Collector's Guide to Heavy Metal	4/10
Crash	5–6/6
Kerrang!	3/5 stars

Keel is the fourth album by the American rock band Keel, released in June 1987. This was the last album to feature guitarists Marc Ferrari and Bryan Jay, as they left the band a year later (although Jay can be heard on the live portion of the band's next release, Larger Than Live.) They eventually re-joined Keel in 1998 to release Keel VI: Back in Action and again in 2009 for the band's 25th anniversary.

This was the band's first album since their 1984 debut Lay Down the Law to be produced by someone other than Gene Simmons. "Calm Before the Storm" was co-written by Jimmy Bain of Dio and Rainbow fame.

== Track listing ==
Side one

1. "United Nations" (Ron Keel) - 4:05
2. "Somebody's Waiting" (Jack Ponti, Russ Arcara) - 3:09
3. "Cherry Lane" (R. Keel, Kenny Chaisson, Dwain Miller) - 3:25
4. "Calm Before the Storm" (R. Keel, Jimmy Bain) - 4:28
5. "King of the Rock" (R. Keel, Chaisson, Marc Ferrari, Miller) - 3:22

Side two

6. "It's a Jungle Out There" (R. Keel, Chaisson, Miller) - 3:46
7. "I Said the Wrong Thing to the Right Girl" (R. Keel, Ferrari) - 4:20
8. "Don't Say You Love Me" (Ponti, Arcara) - 3:37
9. "If Love Is a Crime (I Wanna Be Convicted)" (Ferrari, Chaisson) - 3:45
10. "4th of July" (Bryan Jay, R. Keel, Chaisson, Miller) - 3:50

== Personnel ==
Band members

- Ron Keel – vocals, guitar, keyboards
- Marc Ferrari – guitars, backing vocals
- Bryan Jay – guitars, backing vocals
- Kenny Chaisson – bass, backing vocals
- Dwain Miller – drums, backing vocals

Additional musicians

- Jaime St. James – backing vocals on tracks 6 and 9

Production

- Michael Wagener – producer, engineer, mixing
- Garth Richardson – additional engineering
- George Marino – mastering at Sterling Sound, New York
