= Rik Fox =

American bassist

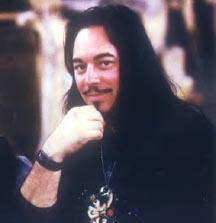
- Fox in 1989

Background information
- Born: Richard Suligowski; December 28, 1955 (age 70); Amityville, New York, U.S.
- Genres: Hard rock, glam metal, heavy metal, progressive rock
- Occupation: Bassist
- Years active: 1975–present
- Website: rikfoxbass.wix.com/rikfox

Richard Suligowski (born December 28, 1955), better known as Rik Fox, is an American heavy metal bassist. He was active mainly during the 1970s and 1980s, in the New York City and Hollywood area rock and metal scenes.

== Early life ==
Fox was born in Amityville, New York, on Long Island, and raised in the Polish neighborhood of Greenpoint, Brooklyn. While in high school, Fox was interested in rock music and photography, choosing as his subjects, the flashy personalities of the New York glam scene of the early 1970s. Among many other famous New York City bands performing on the city's club scene at such famous locales as Max's Kansas City and CBGB (clubs he would also later perform in with a group he joined during the height of the New York City club scene marking his professional debut on Halloween in 1975 at Max's, the Martian Rock Band), he also photographed early Kiss. During this period, he dated a younger sister of original Kiss drummer Peter Criss. Fox and Criss became friends and Fox witnessed the formation of legendary rock band Kiss from the very beginning, including the addition of lead guitarist Ace Frehley.

During his formative club band years, after establishing himself, with the Martian Rock Band and performing at the famed NYC club Max's Kansas City and CBGB, in 1976, Fox found himself joining a well-established New Jersey glam-heavy club band making the rounds named Virgin. Virgin eventually became known as SIN upon Fox's suggested band name change. From the band's biography: "SIN was originally formed in New York/New Jersey in 1976–77, coming out of the ashes of New Jersey club circuit bands VIRGIN and LUST, with the name SIN first being coined by bassist Rik Fox, bringing with him, drummer Basil Stanley (Stan Bassel from Long Island), joining Ian Criss and Keith (Vinny Matthews) Starz. In this line-up the band performed until 1978–79, when Criss left to join another band called Angelface. In 1981, Fox was playing around New York State including weekly shows at the Orangeburg Pub in Orangeburg, NY with the E. Walker Band with Ace Richards on keyboards and guitar, lead singer Ray Dahr and drummer Scott Carlson.

Fox retained the rights to the name SIN and, after moving to L.A. in 1982 to join Sister and name the heavy metal band W.A.S.P. After departing W.A.S.P., Fox networked around L.A. and eventually rehearsed for a short time with both Warlord and Hellion (although never recording or performing live with either band), eventually joining Steeler for one album and after leaving Steeler, with now-proven club-drawing power, reformed two Los Angeles versions of SIN once again."

== Career ==
=== W.A.S.P. ===
After moving to Los Angeles, California, at the invitation of Blackie Lawless, and arriving on February 4, 1982, Fox played bass-guitar in several bands, including Steeler, Sin, and W.A.S.P.. Although the band was called Sister upon his arrival, relatively speaking, he was only associated with W.A.S.P. for four months, February 1982-the end of May 1982), and recorded a live three-track cassette demo. He came up with the name "W.A.S.P.", (there were no periods in the band name at this time—which was validated in an interview by former W.A.S.P. guitarist Randy Piper). The idea is said to have occurred to him after he stepped on a wasp in the courtyard of the house where he lived with band leader Blackie Lawless. The story of W.A.S.P. is retold in the books Bang Your Head: The Rise and Fall of Heavy Metal by David Konow, and "W.A.S.P.; A Sting in the Tale" by Darren P. Upton, As stated, this is confirmed by W.A.S.P. guitarist Randy Piper. Randy spoke to FIB Music "FIB MUSIC (asked) "Who came up with the name W.A.S.P.?" Randy: "Well, actually that was Rik Fox. Him and Blackie are outside building a fog machine, or something and a wasp landed on his hand and Rik said "fuck, that would be a killer name for a band" and Blackie stole it from him. (laughs) Well, I think Blackie put the periods in there, but it definitely was Rik's idea. He claimed that for years and I have to back him up on that, you know what I mean.....I know it to be true."

On the other hand, some who witnessed the formation of W.A.S.P. explain that Rik Fox participated in the band after drummer Tony Richards showed up in the scene; according to Richards, the name was not Circus Circus when he joined the band. FIB MUSIC asked Tony "When you hook up with Blackie, the name of the band was still Circus Circus?" Tony: "No, they had changed the name right away. When I got in there, they were like we are going to start over and do this. I was there from the creation of W.A.S.P.".

Fox contends that to his recollection, the band was named Sister when he joined. Lawless has since begrudgingly confirmed that Fox had indeed, been a band member but, "only for a couple of rehearsals", which may not be entirely accurate, since Fox spent some 4 months rehearsing and writing with the band. Fox is also shown in early band photographs taken by Don Adkins Jr. during the band's first photo session. Causing a firestorm of controversy thirty years later after the fact, despite the grumblings by some die-hard W.A.S.P. fans desperately attempting to re-write a revisionist history of the band, it should be submitted for consideration that, since Fox created the bands' name while he was, in fact, an early co-founding band member, at that moment of the creation of it becoming the band now-known as W.A.S.P., technically speaking, no matter what happened to the band after Fox left, that historic point still qualifies him as an original founding member along with Lawless, Piper and Richards.

All this, has been verified and validated by former W.A.S.P. guitarist Chris Holmes who has stated he agrees to all of the information as being true.

Many unverified allegations usually follow band membership changes, and Fox was no stranger to that. Both Lawless and Richards' narrative, allege that "Rik Fox couldn't do it in the band, his playing was just not right", so they "let him go in a very short period of time." Which comes off as plausible, only because of Lawless's career being much stronger. However, Fox's bass tracks, found on the now rare, collectible live, 'original' W.A.S.P. 3-track demo recorded at Pipers' studio tell a very different story; showing a very solid and melodic bass style by Fox and how much Lawless' narrative was apparently incorrectly misinforming the public. Further, it should also be considered that since it is widely recognized that 'power associates itself with power', it is abundantly clear that if Fox had moved on to a larger successful career, that, thirty years later, nobody would bother attempting to dismiss or dispute his membership in W.A.S.P.; it would have obviously been openly acknowledged by Lawless. Case in point; Czech born New York City guitarist Ivan Kral co-founded the band Blondie and left before the band's first album, similar to Fox's relation to W.A.S.P. Nobody contends or disputes that point, but for Fox's situation, such is the case of being denied membership or credit in the band's history. Furthermore, the question has been put forth in many interviews: "What would W.A.S.P. have been called, if not for Fox's membership in that first original line-up and suggestion in the first place?"

=== Steeler ===
After leaving W.A.S.P., Fox spent a short time rehearsing briefly with both Warlord and Hellion, and then joined the Ron Keel fronted band Steeler in 1983. He'd put an ad in a Los Angeles music magazine looking for a gig and got a call from Keel himself. Fox auditioned for Steeler and was offered the job, but before he'd accepted it, he was offered the bassist duties in the band Angel by keyboardist Greg Giuffria. Fox had a bit of a dilemma, being tempted by Giuffria's offer since Angel was his "dream band". After considering both offers, Fox decided to join Steeler. Fox spent five months in Steeler, long enough to record the self-titled album and play some gigs before being let go from the band. The decision to release Fox was apparently made by Keel and drummer Mark Edwards (who was responsible for informing Fox) for "unspecified reasons". Considering that the band was gaining huge momentum and doing well, this move confused both Fox and the fans, with Steeler changing lineups twice more again within several months before finally becoming the band Keel. According to Fox, Edwards has since spoken with him in 2009 and stated that he "regretted the way the dissolution of the album line-up occurred", further stating that "had that line-up been able to stay together, that a major label signing would definitely have been forthcoming, and the band would have moved to the next plateau of national and international success." Fox actually received more mileage from his time with Steeler after his tenure with W.A.S.P., and contends that Steeler "was one of the seminal cornerstones of the Hollywood rock scene in the early 1980s." This laid the groundwork that was integral for many of the bands yet to follow, such as Poison and Guns N' Roses, just as the MTV era was being introduced to rock music fans. At the time of the original membership change, after Fox's membership was confirmed, Steeler acquired the services of a young, up-an-coming Swedish guitar-whiz virtuoso named Yngwie J. Malmsteen, which gave the band some much-garnered attention, selling out venues and opening for the likes of Hughes/Thrall, Vandenberg, and Quiet Riot at a high point in their respective careers. Unfortunately, Steeler changed their lineup several more times before calling it quits, with Ron Keel eventually forming a band using his surname Keel.

In addition to the Steeler debut album, two more Steeler releases have surfaced over the years in the Steeler legacy: Steeler; Excited '83 (Perkins Palace, Pasadena, CA, USA, supporting Quiet Riot- a rare, excellent quality, live, collectors bootleg), and the Ron Keel released Metal Generation: The Steeler Anthology. Fox appears on all three albums. With show host Eddie Trunk being a fan of Steelers' contribution to heavy metal music history, the question on the minds of the fans of That Metal Show, is the oversight, 'while Yngwie Malmsteen has been a guest of the show several times, why then, has Steeler (as a band-together) been denied consideration as guests?' May 10, 2019 saw a long-awaited Steeler reunion during the KEELFEST concert event held at the Alrosa Villa club in Columbus, Ohio, featuring guitarist Mitch Perry.

=== Going solo with SIN ===
Meanwhile, after leaving Steeler, Fox now had a bankable reputation and sizable following. And so, Fox re-founded the band SIN. (This happened when he formed a band and referred back to the band name he used back in his New Jersey club days going back to 1977-SIN). Fox's first L.A. lineup began to sell out clubs rapidly drawing attention, following on the heels of his popular notoriety from Steeler. However, within six months, despite recording and releasing a "heavy" Angel-meets Judas Priest sounding, now-rare, snake-shaped collectors' picture disc single of the Fox/Drossin penned "On the Run" backed with "Captured in Time", disagreements erupted over a potential new band management direction that Fox questioned, which resulted in the previously unknown band members beginning to publicly entertain ideas of stealing the SIN band name and kicking Fox out of his own band and replace him. Things came to a head during recording what would have been their first album when, after apologizing to the producer of these sessions, Bill Metoyer, Fox stormed out of the session. Wasting no time, Fox quickly re-formed another line up using three newly relocated members of the New York band, Mongol Horde recording artists Alien, who had recently disbanded in New York, contacted Fox and came to Los Angeles to join him in reforming a new lineup of SIN. This lineup enjoyed some well-noticed success, and outstandingly outdid his previous band's accomplishments, finding themselves being voted in a Los Angeles music magazine's fans poll for "The top drawing rock/metal band cumulative for 1984 over Keel, Stryper and Odin." They headlined in dozens of packed-house concerts and shows, including the annual 'Los Angeles Street Scene' before some 5,000 people. This lineup of Sin also co-headlined a show with Christian metal band Stryper and directly supported a show with his former Steeler bandmate band Ron Keel's band Keel.

After being approached and picked up by Jerry Weintraub's 'Management 3' in Beverly Hills, Fox was advised to replace vocalist Frank C. Starr of The Four Horsemen and drummer Mark Anthony Benquechea who were replaced by musicians of producer Dana Strum's choosing and, with singer Mark Slaughter singing the tracking vocals they entered Encore Studios in 1985 to record album master demos, being produced by Vinnie Vincent bassist Dana Strum (who also produced among other L.A. bands, the band Burn). SIN now began receiving attention from the major record labels. However, management issues caused Fox to disband Sin which then fell apart. Additionally, producer Strum then handed over Fox's song "On the Run" to Vincent Vincent who changed the lyrics and re-recorded it as "Let Freedom Rock" for his own album All Systems Go (Vinnie Vincent Invasion album). When Fox attempted to sue, Strum threatened with a counter-suit and then following, Vincent claimed bankruptcy.

=== New band life – Burn and Surgical Steel ===
Upon the breakup of Sin, Fox was approached by Niji Management (associated with Wendy Dio, wife of Ronnie James)'s band Burn (formerly Hellion), who shared the same producer (Dana Strum), and was accepted into the band, spending several months rehearsing with them in 1986. Shortly after, the band dismissed their singer, Richard Parico. Fox then approached a fellow New Yorker, former Anthrax lead singer Neil Turbin to offer him the gig, which Turbin turned down in favor of his own project. During a break in rehearsals, Fox flew to Arizona to scout potential gigs for Burn. At a Loudness concert there, he was approached to join Arizona heavy metal band Surgical Steel, (a band formerly fronted by Jeff Martin later in Badlands and Racer X, and featuring Judas Priest frontman Rob Halford on one of their demos). This meeting led to spending several months performing and recording an album with them and supporting the Lita Ford band for a 1987 New Year's Eve concert. Unfortunately, misfortune struck again when Surgical Steel's financial backing fell through to finish the album, and the recording deal fell through leaving the album unfinished. Fox eventually left the band, returning to Hollywood, (with apparently no 'playing issues' at fault claimed there, either). Fox had successfully recorded with Dokken drummer Mick Brown (musician) for the Surgical Steel sessions. Fox stated in his interviews that "this pattern of bad luck began to take on the appearance of his developing a penchant for joining popular name bands that, despite looking very promising going in, were, in effect, already sinking ships... it began to look like I couldn't stay with a band for very long, which, despite outward appearances, as anyone can easily see, was not the case, since they fell part on their own soon after I left them and I had moved on to other ventures."

However, in the waning years of the 1980s, Rik Fox has shared the stage and performed with some of rock's legends, including the late Ronnie James Dio and rock comedian Sam Kinison, Little Steven, Ozzy Osbourne drummer Randy Castillo, as well as Kiss guitarist Mark St. John, and Bruce Springsteen's drummer, 'Mighty' Max Weinberg, (in the late 1970s), Roseanne's John Goodman, producer Jean Beauvoir, as well as the band Warrant and Guns N' Roses, among others at various all-star jams, or, jamming with the likes of Steppenwolf's legendary guitarist Michael Monarch.

=== 1990s ===
After Fox abandoned his last popular band, Thunderball, and then Flyboyz, in the early 1990s, he abandoned his "pretty-boy look" and played in a local, low-key Hollywood band Wiseguys, camouflaging himself into an incognito image that better fit the band Ministry, than the more Glam-looking bands he created or performed with.

=== New interests ===
After having served five years in the California State Military Reserve (which is a lower civilian branch of the U.S. Army), as a radio operator/communications NCO with the rank of E4 (Corporal), Fox's interest moved on in all things military, which brought him to working in the film industry as an assistant property master, and weapons handler, working on some direct-to-video lower budget films and on the Network syndicated television series Air America, featuring Lorenzo Lamas, and the late Scott Plank, with whom Fox became close friends. Fox also dabbled in acting and took several film roles. He worked on the film Surface to Air with Chad McQueen, Melanie Shatner, and Michael Madsen. Fox acted briefly on the television soap opera General Hospital, acting directly with series anchor Anthony Geary. Fox was also one of the featured interview subjects for the VH-1 Cable series Driven for the episode "The Rise of Mötley Crüe" being a close friend of Nikki Sixx and the band, and recommended to VH-1 producers by former Hollywood booking agent Vicky Hamilton (music executive). Fox was also one of the featured interview subjects for the legendary Rock film parody, The Decline of Western Civilization Part II: The Metal Years by friend and director Penelope Spheeris.

==== Renaissance and living history/re-enactment pioneer ====
Through acting, Fox eventually became involved with the Renaissance Faire scene, and military timeline events such as the Old Fort MacArthur Days where he brought the absent Polish 17th century military history into the forefront. Fox has been referred to by many Polish media correspondents and others as a "recognized pioneer" in this venture, of creating the first representation in the U.S., of the Polish winged hussar cavalry of central Europe which, is a part of his ancestry. Polish 17th century military author Bartosz Musialowicz had interviewed him and written an article about Fox, dubbing him with the honorary title of "The First Saber of the U.S." for founding and creating the first officially recognized representation of the Polish winged hussar cavalry in American history. Fox is the first Polish-American of Polish noble ancestry, to represent the Polish Winged Hussar cavalry in U.S. history. Fox had been nominated as the vice-president of the Los Angeles chapter of the Polish American Congress, in which he served a 4-year term augmenting his position in accomplishing raising Polish Historic Awareness and Culture with some recognition of his efforts by the Polish Consul in Los Angeles. He then stepped aside a second-term for family-related reasons.

=== Back to music and the Winged Hussars ===
Fox is also involved in co-promotion of the European and Japanese market release of The Steeler Anthology with former bandmate Ron Keel. A discussion of a possible Steeler reunion performance has been left open-ended so far. Although he has not left the music field entirely, broadening his horizons, in recent years, Fox has taken a new interest in learning the field of natural horsemanship through his wife Tamara, (married on October 1, 2009, in a small private ceremony), and they train their (rescued) horses, while he continues to work on his pursuit of raising Polish historical awareness and culture and military history with their winged hussar group. Fox, today, is also making a comeback in music. Through Shrapnel Records producer Mike Varney, Fox has recently re-connected with fellow Steeler bandmate and drummer Mark Edwards.

Renewed interest is being shown to Steeler, by DJ Shadow, who expressed interest in using some of Steeler's music for a new project, which will possibly revive an interest in Steeler once again for the next "Metal Generation" to come as well as previous fans who still listen to their classic album. Fox was interviewed in the 2011 book release W.A.S.P.; A Sting in the Tale by author Darren P. Upton, and asked to share his input on the early days of the band's creation of which he is now known to have been an original founding member of.

Fox was also featured in three more book releases. The first book is by NPR personality Charlie Schroeder, titled Man of War, regarding Schroeder's experiences of participating with various re-enactments of warriors of military history to see and experience what it was like to be those historical warriors. Among the many historical impressions in the book, Schroeder spent a day with Fox's Polish Winged Hussar living history group. The second book, by Kiss author Ken Sharp for the New York Times bestseller Nothing to Lose regarding the band Kiss in their formative years, of which Fox was an active part. The book features various first-hand historical anecdotes and exclusive early live photos contributed by Fox. Fox was also slated to be among the featured performers in the upcoming coffee table book Lost Rockers published in 2015. The third book, by historian Miltiades Varvounis, titled Made in Poland: The Women and Men Who Changed the World, in which Fox was included among author's list of the 100 most influential Polish people that changed the world.

In promoting his ancestral noble Polish heritage, Rik was featured as a 17th-century Polish winged hussar cavalry-knight figure in the documentary film Path to Glory; The Rise and Rise of the Polish Arabian Horse, as well as having been the featured subject in 2013, for the (Canadian) History Channel cable television series Museum Secrets, which selects various curious topics of history and expounds upon them. In Fox's case, for the episode dealing with the Moscow State Museum in Russia, and a suit of Polish winged armor on display there, the director and producer sought him out because, in the words of the segment producer: "of all his active research on the subject and what he has brought to the table with regard to his being the most highly visible contributions of promoting the winged hussars and Polish history in the United States." The episode dedicated to the winged hussars for Season Three is considered ground-breaking for finally producing valuable information being made available to the mainstream public in the English-language on the winged hussars.

In addition to returning to music or reform another band lineup, Fox has also recorded bass tracks for the re-make Rascal's song "I Ain't Gonna Eat Out My Heart Anymore" (originally covered by the band Angel) for the Spiders & Snakes 2014 album release The Year of the Snake, and stepped in temporarily replacing bassist Phil St. Vincent for several live shows until Vincent returned.

Fox also left his endorsement deal as an artist endorsing the GHS company, and currently has switched to promoting the DR brand of bass strings, and, has although finally become the owner of a white neck-thru-body Epiphone Thunderbird-IV™ bass, Fox has signed a deal to endorse the Esola Custom Guitar Company which will be making his own signature Rik Fox "Thunder Eagle™"(c) model bass. This will join his promotion and usage of the EMG bass pickups and Babicz custom bass bridge. Already being a published writer, public demand has motivated Fox to pen his own biography, currently in the works. Fox is also writing a book on his creation and introduction of the winged hussars' representation in America.

Fox is also a graduate and active member of Community Emergency Response Team (CERT), which is an Emergency Management Services augmentation support organization under the Los Angeles City and County Fire Department and Federal Emergency Management Agency (FEMA). He also holds a FEMA certificate and four completion certificates from the St. Petersburg College – Southeastern Public Safety Institute – Multijurisdictional Counterdrug Task Force. Additionally, Fox is a licensed Security Officer, and a licensed Ham Radio operator, call-sign KM6CDJ.

== Discography ==
Rik Fox Discography / Credits

With the Martian Rock Band

- 1975: New York City, N.Y. No recorded releases. Band photos by Leee Black Childers/Mainman. Several live performances (including the Max's Kansas City and CBGB's) Band photos, no demo, no known video.

With SIN

- 1977, First Sin Demo- Rock 'n Reel Studios, L.I., N.Y. September
- 1977 "Lady Killer" (Rik Fox), "Dance Momma, Dance" (Ian Criss/Rik Fox/Vinnie Matthews), "Slasher" (Ian Criss), "Little Girl" (Ian Criss. Rik Fox). Band photos and demo only. No known video.

With The E. Walker Band

- 1980–81: Cover band – New Jersey/N.Y. Demo session/original songs. Bass credits only. Live Performances six nights per week, 1980–1981. Band photos and demo only. No known video.

With Aggressor

- 1982: Cover band – New Jersey/N.Y. Live performances / band photos only. Shrapnel Records recording artist, Guitarist Dave Ferrara was band member. No known video or recorded material with Fox.

With W.A.S.P.

- 1982, W.A.S.P. Demo (mistakenly referred to as 'Face the Attack'), Magnum Opus rehearsal Studios, Buena Park, CA. April 1982 Six songs. Wrote and played bass on;
- B.A.D.
- School Daze
- On Your Knees
- Sleeping in the Fire
- Hellion
- (One song not properly credited) "Master of Disaster"

(Blackie Lawless/Rik Fox-Bass & lyrics). No live performances – band photos by Don Adkins Jr.

With Warlord

- 1982: No Recorded releases/ no known band photos – taped rehearsals only.

With Hellion

- 1982: No recorded releases/ no known band photos – auditions/rehearsals only.

With Steeler

- 1982–83, Steeler Debut album, Prairie Sun Recording Studios, Cotati, CA. Shrapnel Records release. Recorded bass – entire album/all tracks. One cut credited: "Abduction" (Theme). Live performances March 1983—May 1983. No known video of this lineup.

Studio:

- 1983 – Steeler

Live:

- Steeler Excited '83, (Live album) Perkins Palace, Pasadena, CA, USA
- Metal Generation: The Steeler Anthology

With Chris Impeliteri – 1983: Rehearsals only /produced no known product/photos.

With Sin

- 1983, Sin (L.A. Mach I), Snake picture disc single released: "On the Run" (Rik Fox/H. Drossin), b/w "Captured in Time". Now considered a rare collector's item. Several live performances, band photos, no known video available.
- 1984, Sin (L.A. Mach II), Demo, Sunburst Studios, Culver City, CA. September 2, 1984.

Producer: Rik Fox. Eight songs. Writing credits: "On the Run" (Fox/Drossin), "Ladies man" (Fox/Martel/Starr), "I'm No Angel" (Fox), "Vendetta" (Fox/Martel/Kristi). Dozens of live performances, band photos, no known video available.

- 1985, SIN (Album Master Demos), Kendun/Encore Recording Studios, Burbank, CA. Producer: Dana Strum. Four songs. "On the Run" (Rik Fox), "Don't Say Goodbye" (Kristi/Starr), "We Got Your Rock" (M. Kupersmith), "Break Down the Walls (That Stop the Rock) (Fox, Kristi/Martel).

With Burn

- 1986/87: No Recorded releases/no known band photos – rehearsals only.

With Surgical Steel

- 1986–87: Debut album, El Chaton Studios, Phoenix, AZ. Producer: Dan Wexler.

Eight-nine songs (?) Unspecified. Song credits two (?), recorded entire album.

Recorded with Dokken drummer Mick Brown on one track. Album Project unfinished/shelved; lack of budget to complete project. Several live performances including support for Lita Ford. Band photos, no known video available.

With Thunderball

- 1987–88: Demo, Pro Rock Studios, North Hollywood, CA. Producer: Rik Fox

Three songs. "Gypsy Brandy" (Rik Fox), "Love Trap" (C. Freeman/J. Aguar), "Cry of Love" (Fox/Mazzola). Other songs: "Back in Action" (Fox/Mazzola), "Bitchin' Bewitchin' "(Fox), "The Fire Still Burnz" (Fox/Mazzola). Several live performances recorded on video, band photos.

With Dr. Starr & the Medics

- 1989: One Live Guest Performance, Phoenix, AZ. No known video.

With Saints Ghosts & Thieves

- 1990: (w/ Carlo Bartolini from Dramarama) One Live Guest performance, Madam Wong's West. No known video.

With Johnny Crash

- 1990 Johnny Crash debut album "Neighborhood Threat". Song: "Freedom Road" – Background vocals – no known promotional photos or video documentation available.

With Kings Horses (with Randy Piper of W.A.S.P.)

- 1991: One live performance, The Waters Club, San Pedro, CA. Live photos, no known video available.

With Flyboyz

- 1992: Demo, Five songs. Two songs credited: "Fascination" (Rik Fox), "Bad Reputation" (Fox/D. James). Several live shows – no video.

With Spiders & Snakes

- 1993: two live performance, several live band photos, no known video.
- 2014: Recorded bass tracks for the re-make Rascal's song "I Ain't Gonna Eat Out My Heart Anymore" Spiders & Snakes 2014 album release 'The Year of the Snake'. Several show performances videotaped and uploaded on to YouTube.

Live Guest Performances With: Mark St. John (Kiss) January 4, 1987

- "Rock 'n Roll"—Joshua's Parlor, Orange Co. CA.

Sam Kinison, 1988

- "Wild Thing"-The China Club, Hollywood, CA. (including John Goodman, Steven Van Zant, Randy Castillo, Jean Beauvoir, Randy Hansen).
- Ronnie James Dio (Dio) July 26, 1986
- "We're Stars" – Irvine Meadows, (Sacred Heart Tour show), and the following weekend with Rough Cutt at the Country Club, Reseda, CA.

With Jim Crean

- recorded 2018/released 2019 album "The London Fog" Guest performances on album, single "Broken" with Black Sabbath / Dio drummer Vinny Appice, Robby Lochner and Steph Honde. Recorded on Angel cover song "Don't take Your Love" with Angel vocalist Frank DiMino and Black Sabbath / Dio drummer Vinny Appice. Album contains many A-List Industry performers such as Carmine Appice and Vinny Appice, Tony Franklin, Rudy Sarzo, Mike Tramp, Chris Holmes, Mitch Perry and many others.

As of 2019, Fox has been performing as a member of "The World's Best Deep Purple Tribute" from Los Angeles, known as "Child in Time.

Several All-Star Jams in Los Angeles 2013 to present:

- "Cold Day in Hell" and "Serenade" with Keel at The Whisky a Go-Go, Hollywood, CA., "You Drive me Nervous", "Touch Too Much" at The Dave Brown Cancer Charity Benefit at Paladino's Club, with Betsy Bitch and her 'Knockers' band. Several Kevin Estrada (Photographer) Birthday Jams and a performance at the Rock Against Trafficking Benefit with both Kevin Estrada and Spiders & Snakes.

"The Trooper" at Lucy 51's Club with August Zadra, Pauly Z and Brian Tichy, Several performances with Los Angeles bands White Lie and Spiders & Snakes. (all video performances on YouTube)

== Equipment ==
Rik has or is endorsing the following musical equipment gear:

- Esola Custom Guitars
- DR Strings DR Bass Strings
- Babicz Guitars Babicz Bridges
- Randall Bass Amplifiers (1983 to present)
- Ampeg Bass Amplifiers (1970's thru 1983)
- B.C. Rich Custom Basses (1985 to present)
- Ibanez Destroyer Bass (1970's to 1983)
- Aria Pro II Custom Blood Bass (1983 to present)
- Gibson 1975 EB-3 Bass (1985 to present)
- Epiphone Thunderbird Basses (2010 to present)
- GHS Bass Strings (1983 to present)
- DiMarzio Bass Pickups
- EMG Bass Pickups
- NADY Wireless Systems
- Dunlop Custom Picks
- Belden (and other) Cables
- M. Honer Blues Harp Harmonicas
- DiMarzio Guitar straps
