= Geno Arce =

American bass guitarist (born 1964)

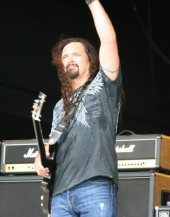

Background information
- Born: Genaro J. Arce; 1964 (age 61–62)
- Genres: Heavy metal Glam metal Country; Southern Rock
- Instruments: Bass guitar Backup Vocals
- Member of: IronHorse; Badlands House Band; Keel
- Formerly of: Syngin; SX; Box of Cherries; The Einsteins; Harry and the Gila Monsters
- Website: www.keelnation.com www.myspace.com/genoplaysbass www.badlandshouseband.com www.badlandspawn.com

Geno Arce (born 1964) is an American bassist

Arce started playing bass in the clubs at age 16 opening for bands like Black 'n Blue and Fire Eye. Graduating from high school in 1982, he joined the navy and did his stint for his country. After receiving an honorable discharge, he returned to Portland for a short while and then relocated to Phoenix Arizona. While in Phoenix Geno performed on the local scene and in Los Angeles with the bands "Syngin, SX, and Box of Cherries, which later became "The Einsteins."

In 1998 Geno joined forces with Ron Keel to form the "Roadhouse Rattlers" and began his journey into Southern Rock and Country Music. In 1999 Ron Keel had to take a trip to Europe and Geno Joined Phoenix Arizona’s "Harry and the Gila Monsters" furthering a career in country music that would allow him to share the stage with acts such as Brooks and Dunn, Reba McEntire, Montgomery Gentry, Neal McCoy, and many others.

In 2000, Geno and Ron Keel were reunited, moved to Plain City Ohio where they formed the international southern rock band "IronHorse" consisting of Ron Keel vocals, Geno Arce Bass, Swedish musician Robert Marcello Guitar, and Gaetano Nicolosi on drums. During its five year lifetime IronHorse performed all throughout the United States opening for bands such as "The Outlaws and Ted Nugent" In 2008 Geno Joined the all original lineup of Keel consisting of Ron Keel, Marc Ferrari, Bryan Jay, Dwain Miller and replacing bassist Kenny Chaisson.

In June 2016 Geno was asked by Ron Keel to join him in another project called Badlands House Band. This band is part of a larger project in Sioux Falls SD called Badlands Pawn. and the brain child of Chuck Brennan.

== Discography ==
=== SX ===
- SX (1990) Woofa Records
- Diamonds in the Rough (1992) Rodell Records

=== Einsteins, The ===
- Einsteins, The (1996) Transmission Records
- O (1998) Mellancamp Records

=== Harry and the Gila Monsters ===
- Self Titled (1999) Self Release

=== IronHorse ===
- IronHorse (2001) Melodic Mayhem Music
- Warmth in the wilderness a tribute to Jason Becker (2001) Lion Music
- Bring It On (2004) Compendia
- Change My Religion (2007) Self Release

=== Keel ===
- Streets of Rock & Roll (2010) Frontiers Records
- Metal Cowboy (2014) Wild Media Productions
