= Pandemonium (band) =

American heavy metal band

- Also known as: Demon (1977 - 1980)
- Origin: Fairbanks, Alaska, United States
- Genres: Heavy metal, speed metal, hard rock (early)
- Years active: 1977 - 1990, 2012
- Label: Metal Blade

Pandemonium is an American heavy metal band from Fairbanks, Alaska, United States, that moved to Los Angeles, in the early 1980s. The band released three albums on Metal Blade Records, and was featured on the first Metal Massacre record with Metallica, Ratt, and Steeler. Lead singer Chris Resch died of a heart attack in 2007.

== History ==
=== 1980s ===
Arriving in Los Angeles in late 1980 with original drummer Kevin Fitzgerald, Pandemonium began playing the local club circuit, along the way playing shows with Ratt, W.A.S.P., Great White, Malice, Metallica, and other groups. After a couple of years the band had risen to weekend headlining status at famous clubs such as the Troubadour, the Whisky a Go Go and the Roxy. After appearing on the first Metal Massacre album with Ratt, Bitch, Steeler and Metallica, Pandemonium signed a three-album deal with Metal BladeRecords.

1983 saw the release of their first album Heavy Metal Soldiers, increasing press coverage, good reviews, and the arrival of new drummer Glen Holland, later in Noize Toys and also known as Glen Söderling (W.A.S.P, 1987) and Tripp Holland in the band Engines of Aggression. During this time Pandemonium shared stages with bands such as Ratt, Metallica, Slayer, Quiet Riot, Black'N Blue, Rough Cutt, White Sister, Girlschool, and W.A.S.P. In mid-1984 the band played a sold-out show back in their home state of Alaska, opening for the Scorpions in Anchorage, on their Love at First Sting tour.

Second album, Hole In The Sky was release late in 1985, on Metal Blade Records, and featured new drummer Dave Basch. Engineered and co-produced by well known producer Bill Metoyer, this album had much better, heavier sound and received great reviews. During the next year, Pandemonium had moved up to headlining status at all of the major venues in the Los Angeles area, and also toured some, including shows all over California and in Las Vegas.

Their third album, The Kill, also co-produced by Bill Metoyer, was released in early 1988, and featured new drummer Dave Graybill. The band shed their glam image to go along with the much heavier, Black Sabbath influenced sound of the new record. Many shows were played in the Los Angeles area to support it, including big LA shows headlined by Savatage, Kings X, Sanctuary, and Killer Dwarfs among others. After the departure of drummer Graybill in 1989, sensing the changing of the music scene, Pandemonium broke up in late 1989.

=== 1990–present ===
David and Eric Resch moved to Seattle in 1990 and recorded a seven-song unreleased demo for a fourth album, playing clubs and recording as a trio, with new drummer Shane Wacaster. Ironically, the grunge movement of their new city, Seattle, made it clear that times had changed, so they chose to put together a cover/bar band that became popular, and played all over the North West for years. Singer Chris Resch moved back to hometown of Fairbanks, Alaska, in the 1990s and lived a happy, productive life working as a painter/drywaller, and riding dirtbikes and snowmobiles all over Alaska and the family "homestead" until he died in 2007, of a heart attack, at the age of 48.

Eric Resch still lives in Seattle, owns a Karaoke business, and plays in a couple of cover/bar bands to this day. David Resch moved back to home town of Fairbanks in 2015, and also plays in a popular cover band, as well as working at a large musical instrument store, where he bought his first guitar in the late 1970s.

In 2012, expanded versions of all three albums, on CD, with extensive liner notes, new photos, and unreleased bonus tracks were released on Retrospect Records. The label is now defunct, but copies are available on the internet and in record stores around the world. Negotiations are underway for another re-issue on a new label as of 2021.

== Members ==
- Chris Resch – Lead vocals / Live rhythm guitar
- David Resch – Lead and rhythm guitar / back up vocals
- Eric Resch – bass / second lead and backup vocals
- Dave Basch – drums (1984-1986) (drummer on Hole in the Sky)

Past members

- Kevin Fitzgerald – drums (1978-1982); played on Heavy Metal Soldiers
- Glenn "Tripp" Holland – drums (1983-1984); joined after recording of first album, but played on two tracks of Hole in The Sky
- Dave Graybill – drums (1986-1989); played on third album, The Kill
- Billy D'Vette – guitar (moved from guitar tech to second guitarist for three months in 1985)

== Discography ==
- Heavy Metal Soldiers (1983)
- Hole in the Sky (1985)
- The Kill (1988)

As featured artist

- Metal Massacre (1982)
