= The Right to Rock =

Studio album by Keel
- Released: January 28, 1985
- Studio: Record Plant, Los Angeles; Mediasound, New York City
- Genre: Hard rock; glam metal
- Length: 39:49
- Label: Gold Mountain/A&M (US); Vertigo (Europe); King (Japan)
- Producer: Gene Simmons

Keel chronology
Lay Down the Law (1984)	The Right to Rock (1985)	The Final Frontier (1986)

Singles from The Right to Rock
- 1. "The Right to Rock" Released: 1985

Professional ratings
Review scores
Source	Rating
AllMusic	4.5/5 stars
Collector's Guide to Heavy Metal	6/10

The Right to Rock is the second studio album by American rock band Keel. It was the first to be produced by Kiss's Gene Simmons under their new label Gold Mountain Records (which was distributed by A&M Records at the time). When the band started recording the album, drummer Bobby Marks left. He was replaced by different drummers: Fred Coury (who went on to join Cinderella), Barry Brandt (of Angel) and Steve Riley (who plays on the entire album but subsequently left to join the band W.A.S.P.). Dwain Miller eventually became the band's permanent drummer right before the album was released. The band had only written three songs when the label sent them to the studio, therefore Keel covered three Gene Simmons demos and re-recorded three songs from their debut album – "Tonight You're Mine" was renamed to "You're the Victim (I'm the Crime)" for this album.

== Track listing ==
Side one

1. "The Right to Rock" (Ron Keel, Marc Ferrari, Kenny Chaisson) – 3:35
2. "Back to the City" (R. Keel, Chaisson) – 3:47
3. "Let's Spend the Night Together" (Mick Jagger, Keith Richards) – 3:41
4. "Easier Said than Done" (Gene Simmons, Mitch Weissman) – 3:25
5. "So Many Girls, So Little Time" (Simmons, Howard Rice) – 3:15

Side two

6. "Electric Love" (R. Keel, Chaisson) – 4:05
7. "Speed Demon" (R. Keel) – 3:39
8. "Get Down" (Simmons, Rice) – 5:02
9. "You're the Victim (I'm the Crime)" (R. Keel, Chaisson, Bobby Marks) – 2:59

The remastered version of the album features two bonus tracks – a remixed version of "Easier Said than Done", and a "reunion" version of "The Right to Rock".

== Personnel ==
Band members

- Ron Keel – vocals and guitar
- Marc Ferrari – guitar and vocals
- Bryan Jay – guitar and vocals
- Kenny Chaisson – bass and vocals
- Steve Riley – drums and vocals

Production

- Gene Simmons – producer
- Mike Davis – engineer, mixing
- Paul Wertheimer, Sebastian Thoner, Bruce Smith, Eddie Delena, Craig Engel – assistant engineers
- Greg Fulginti – mastering
- Aaron Rapoport – photography
- Chuck Beeson – art direction, design
- John Taylor Dismukes – illustrations
- Ron Keel – liner notes

== In popular culture ==
- The song "Speed Demon" by Keel was used in the 2002 movie, Men In Black II at the post office scene, when Agent J shows Agent K an alien inside a mail sorting machine.
