= Relapse Records =

American record label

- Founded: 1990
- Founder: Matthew F. Jacobson
- Distributors: The Orchard (U.S.), INgrooves/Fontana (Canada), eOne Music (worldwide)
- Genre: Extreme metal; heavy metal; hardcore punk; metalcore; indie rock; electronic; experimental; ambient; industrial; noise music; grindcore
- Country of origin: United States
- Location: Upper Darby Township, Pennsylvania
- Official website: www.relapse.com

Relapse Records is an American independent record label based in Upper Darby Township, Pennsylvania. It was founded by Matthew F. Jacobson in 1990. The label features many grindcore, death metal, metalcore and sludge metal artists.

== History ==
The label was started by Matthew F. Jacobson in August 1990 in his parents' basement in Aurora, Colorado. The first two releases on the label were 7-inch singles by the bands Velcro Overdose and Face of Decline, Apparition 7" came next [RR003] closely followed by three death metal bands that would become among the biggest on the label, Deceased, Suffocation, and Incantation.

After this, Jacobson became acquainted with William Yurkiewicz Jr., who became his partner in the record label. Yurkiewicz had founded his own record label, which was soon to release albums from the bands General Surgery, Disrupt, Destroy, Misery, and Yurkiewicz's own grindcore band Exit-13. The two joined forces to create Relapse Records, aiming to release high-quality, professionally packaged extreme music.

In 1991, the label moved their headquarters to Millersville, Pennsylvania. In 1992, the label expanded its range with the creation of its subsidiary label called Release Entertainment, which specializes in experimental, ambient, industrial, and noise titles. With continued growth came a mail-order/wholesale operation that soon became the largest underground distribution center for all things metal in the United States. The mail-order service carried a wide array of extreme music recordings and merchandise, as well as publications from around the world.

Throughout the years Relapse has continued to grow and sign on more influential artists from a broader range of genres. In 1996, Relapse unveiled the Resound Music Resource Guide. Resound gave fans direct access to the label's roster through interviews and reviews, as well as being part mail-order catalog.

In 1998, Relapse opened a promotions office in Berlin, as well as establishing a German distribution deal. In 2003, Relapse held a music festival - the Relapse Contamination Festival took place on January 18 and 19 at the Trocadero Theatre in Philadelphia, Pennsylvania and featured various Relapse artists. In 2000, the label relocated to Upper Darby, outside of Philadelphia and began plans to include a physical record store. In June 2001, the label opened their first record store off of South Street in Philadelphia.

In 2010, Relapse announced that they had done a deal with intellectual property lawyer Eric Greif and Perseverance Holdings Ltd. to take over Chuck Schuldiner's catalog and the Death and Control Denied names internationally. Death's 1995 sixth studio album, Symbolic was excluded from the deal as the rights for said record remain with Roadrunner Records.

On August 5, 2011, Relapse announced a 24-week pay what you want partnership with Moshpit Tragedy Records, issuing one mp3 album from the Relapse catalog every week through Moshpit Tragedy's website.

== Artists ==
=== Current artists ===
- 16
- Absent In Body
- Agoraphobic Nosebleed
- Amenra
- Arcadea
- ASG
- Atriarch
- Author & Punisher
- Black Anvil
- Black Salvation
- Brain Tentacles
- Call of the Void
- Cave In
- Cephalic Carnage
- Ceremony
- Christian Mistress
- Cloakroom
- Coffins
- Cough
- Cretin
- Cripple Bastards
- Deadguy
- Devil Master
- Devourment
- Disfear
- Dying Fetus
- Ex Eye
- Exhumed
- Expulsion
- Genghis Tron
- Genocide Pact
- Graves at Sea
- Gruesome
- Haemorrhage
- Hoaxed
- Horseback
- Ilsa
- Incantation
- Integrity
- Inter Arma
- Inverloch
- Iron Monkey
- Iron Reagan
- John Frum
- Lycus
- Magrudergrind
- Mammoth Grinder
- Miracle
- Monolord
- Moore, Steve
- Mortals
- Myrkur
- Nothing
- Obituary
- Outer Heaven
- Pig Destroyer
- Pinkish Black
- Poison Blood
- Poison Ruïn
- Primate
- Primitive Man
- Red Fang
- Repulsion
- Ripped to Shreds
- Ringworm
- Seven Sisters of Sleep
- Skinless
- Sumerlands
- Survive
- Temple of Void
- Trappist
- True Widow
- Ulcerate
- Unearthly Trance
- Usnea
- Valkyrie
- Walking Wounded
- Warning
- Windhand
- Wolves in the Throne Room
- Wrong
- Yautja
- Yob
- Zombi
- Zonal

=== Former artists ===
- 27
- Abysmal Dawn
- Agenda of Swine
- Alabama Thunderpussy
- The Album Leaf
- Alchemist
- Amorphis
- Anal Cunt
- Anatomy of Habit
- Antigama
- Atheist
- Baroness
- Bedemon
- Benümb
- Birds of Prey
- Black Tusk
- Blockheads
- Blood Duster
- Bloodiest
- Bodychoke
- Bongzilla
- Boris
- Brian Posehn
- Broughton's Rules
- Brutal Truth
- Buried Inside
- Burnt by the Sun
- Burst
- Buzzoven
- Car Bomb
- Chris Connelly
- Christian Mistress
- Circle of Animals
- Coalesce
- Columns
- Coldworker
- Coliseum
- Control Denied
- Converge
- Convulse
- The County Medical Examiners
- Culted
- Death
- Dead World
- Deceased
- Dekapitator
- The Dillinger Escape Plan
- Disembowelment
- Disrupt
- The Drip
- Dukatalon
- Don Caballero
- Dysrhythmia
- East West Blast Test
- Ecstatic Vision
- The End
- Exit-13
- Facedowninshit
- Final Conflict
- Fuck the Facts
- Full of Hell
- Gadget
- Gatecreeper
- General Surgery
- Genocide Superstars
- Goblin Rebirth
- Godflesh
- Graves of Valor
- Hail!Hornet
- Halo
- Hemdale
- Hero Destroyed
- The High Confessions
- High on Fire
- Hooded Menace
- Hope Drone
- Howl
- Scott Hull
- Human Remains
- Indian
- Inevitable End
- Joel Grind
- Jucifer
- Kingdom of Sorrow
- Kill the Client
- Liberteer
- Locrian
- Looking for An Answer
- Lord Dying
- Maruta
- Man Must Die
- Mastodon
- Merzbow
- Mindrot
- Minsk
- Misery Index
- Mortals
- Mortician
- Mose Giganticus
- Mumakil
- Murder Construct
- Nasum
- Necrophagist
- Neurosis
- Nightstick
- Nile
- Noisear
- Nux Vomica
- Obliteration
- Obscura
- Opprobrium
- Origin
- Pan.Thy.Monium
- Pentagram
- Phobia
- Publicist UK
- Pyrrhon
- Rabbits
- Razor
- Red Harvest
- Revocation
- Rotten Sound
- Royal Thunder
- Rumpelstiltskin Grinder
- Rwake
- Serpentine Path
- Siege
- Soilent Green
- Spawn of Possession
- Tau Cross
- The Obsessed
- Titan
- Today Is the Day
- Tombs
- Torche
- Toxic Holocaust
- UltraMantis Black
- Unkind
- Unsane
- Victims
- Voivod
- Vverevvolf Grehv
- Weapon
- Weekend Nachos
- Wolvserpent
- Zeke

== See also ==
- List of record labels
