= The Final Frontier (Keel album) =

Studio album by Keel
- Released: April 30, 1986
- Recorded: 1986
- Studios: Electric Lady Studios, New York City, Baby-O Studios and Village Recorders, Los Angeles
- Genres: Hard rock, glam metal
- Length: 35:34
- Labels: Gold Mountain/MCA (US); Vertigo (Europe)
- Producer: Gene Simmons

Keel chronology
The Right to Rock (1985)	The Final Frontier (1986)	Keel (1987)

Singles from The Final Frontier
- 1. "Tears of Fire" Released: 1986; 2. "Because the Night" Released: 1986

Professional ratings
Review scores
Source	Rating
AllMusic	3/5 stars
Collector's Guide to Heavy Metal	4/10

The Final Frontier is a 1986 album by American rock band Keel. It was the band's second album to be produced by Kiss bassist Gene Simmons. Videos were filmed for the tracks "Because the Night" (a Patti Smith Group cover) and "Tears of Fire".

== Track listing ==
Side one

1. "The Final Frontier" (Ron Keel, Greg Chaisson) – 3.20
2. "Rock and Roll Animal" (Marc Ferrari) – 4.47
3. "Because the Night" (Bruce Springsteen, Patti Smith) – 3.47
4. "Here Today, Gone Tomorrow" (R. Keel) – 4.06
5. "Arm and a Leg" (R. Keel, Ferrari, Bryan Jay, Chaisson) – 3.08

Side two

6. "Raised on Rock" (Ferrari) – 3.10
7. "Just Another Girl" (R. Keel) – 3.16
8. "Tears of Fire" (Ferrari) – 4.20
9. "Nightfall" (Ferrari) – 1.56
10. "No Pain No Gain" (R. Keel) – 3.44

== Personnel ==
Band members

- Ron Keel – vocals, guitars, keyboards
- Marc Ferrari – guitars, backing vocals
- Bryan Jay – guitars, backing vocals
- Kenny Chaisson – bass, backing vocals
- Dwain Miller – drums, backing vocals

Guest musicians

- Michael Des Barres – vocals on "Raised on Rock"
- Joan Jett – rhythm guitar on "Raised on Rock"
- Jaime St. James – backing vocals on "Rock and Roll Animal"
- Gregg Giuffria – backing vocals on "No Pain No Gain"
- Mitch Perry – guitar on "Tears of Fire"

Production

- Gene Simmons – producer
- Dave Wittman – engineer, mixing
- Bruce Buchhalter, Tom Nist, Kevin Smith – assistant engineers
- George Marino – mastering at Sterling Sound, New York
- John Taylor Dismukes – art direction
- Neil Zlozower – photography
