= Larry Flick =

American music journalist (born 1963)

- Born: June 29, 1963 (age 63); The Bronx, New York City, U.S.
- Citizenship: United States
- Education: Queens College, City University of New York
- Occupations: Journalist; editor; critic; radio producer; radio host
- Writing career
- Language: English
- Genre: Journalism
- Subject: Music

Larry Flick (born June 29, 1963) is an American journalist, former dance music columnist, single reviewer, and Senior Talent Editor for Billboard magazine, where he worked for 14 years. He later produced and hosted SiriusXM radio shows.

== Biography ==
Born in the Bronx, Flick started in the music business at 21 as a college radio rep at a company called Gold Mountain. He went on the road as a touring assistant to the Power Station and Kiss during their 1980s heyday. He later became the dance music editor for Billboard.
