= Marching Out =

Studio album by Yngwie Malmsteen
- Released: 19 August 1985
- Studio: Cherokee Studios, Los Angeles; Skyline Studios, Topanga, California
- Genre: Neoclassical metal; heavy metal; power metal
- Length: 45:22
- Label: Polydor
- Producer: Yngwie Malmsteen

Yngwie Malmsteen chronology
Rising Force (1984)	Marching Out (1985)	Trilogy (1986)

Alternative cover
- American vinyl and cassette edition

Singles from Marching Out
- 1. "I Am a Viking" / "Don't Let It End" Released: 1985

Marching Out is the second studio album by guitarist Yngwie Malmsteen, released on 19 August 1985 through Polydor Records. The album reached No. 52 on the U.S. Billboard 200 and remained on that chart for 28 weeks, as well as reaching the top 30 in two other countries.

This was the second Malmsteen album to feature Jeff Scott Soto on lead vocals. After this album, Soto did not reappear as lead vocalist until the 1996 album Inspiration.

"On the Run Again" is a remake of "Victim of the City", a song written in 1983 by Malmsteen's earlier band Steeler, which was later released on their 2005 compilation album Metal Generation: The Steeler Anthology.

== Critical reception ==
Professional ratings
Review scores
Source	Rating
AllMusic	3.5/5 stars
Collector's Guide to Heavy Metal	10/10
Kerrang!	3/5 stars

Steve Huey at AllMusic gave Marching Out 3.5 stars out of five, calling it a "worthwhile listen" but being somewhat critical of Malmsteen's lyrics and the songs' fantasy-oriented subject matter. Malmsteen's guitar work was described as "slightly more raw and aggressive" than his 1984 debut album Rising Force.

== Track listing ==
All music is composed by Yngwie Malmsteen.

No.	Title	Lyrics	Length
1.	"Prelude"	(instrumental)	1:00
2.	"I'll See the Light, Tonight"	Malmsteen, Jeff Scott Soto	4:27
3.	"Don't Let It End"	Malmsteen, Soto	4:09
4.	"Disciples of Hell"	Malmsteen	5:53
5.	"I Am a Viking"	Malmsteen	6:00
6.	"Overture 1383"	(instrumental)	2:58
7.	"Anguish and Fear"	Malmsteen	3:50
8.	"On the Run Again"	Soto	3:25
9.	"Soldier Without Faith"	Malmsteen	6:10
10.	"Caught in the Middle"	Malmsteen, Soto	4:20
11.	"Marching Out"	(instrumental)	3:10
Total length:			45:22

== Personnel ==
- Yngwie Malmsteen – guitar, Moog Taurus, backing vocals, arrangement, mixing, producer
- Jeff Scott Soto – lead vocals (except for tracks 1, 6 & 11)
- Jens Johansson – keyboard
- Anders Johansson – drums
- Marcel Jacob – bass
- Lester Claypool – engineering
- Peter Vargo – engineering assistance

== Charts ==
Chart (1985)	Peak position
Dutch Albums (Album Top 100)	30
Finnish Albums (The Official Finnish Charts)	19
Japanese Albums (Oricon)	18
Swedish Albums (Sverigetopplistan)	9
US Billboard 200	54
