= Streets of Rock & Roll =

Studio album by Keel
- Released: January 29, 2010
- Recorded: 2009
- Studio: Sound Image Studios and JoJo Ocean Studios, Los Angeles, Odds On Studios and Musicworks Studios, Las Vegas
- Genre: Hard rock, glam metal
- Length: 50:19
- Label: Frontiers
- Producer: Pat Regan, Paul Shortino

Keel chronology
Keel VI: Back in Action (1998)	Streets of Rock & Roll (2010)

Professional ratings
Review scores
Source	Rating
AllMusic	3.5/5 stars
Classic Rock	7/10 stars
Metal Temple	10/10 stars

Streets of Rock & Roll is the seventh studio album by American rock band Keel, released in 2010. It marks the band's first studio recording since their 2008 reunion and is the first to feature new bassist Geno Arce.

== Track listing ==
1. "Streets of Rock & Roll" (Brian Jay, Ron Keel, Dwain Miller) – 4:46
2. "Hit the Ground Running" (Jay, Keel) – 3:51
3. "Come Hell or High Water" (Marc Ferrari, Keel, Jay) – 4:00
4. "Push & Pull" (Ferrari, Keel) – 4:58
5. "Does Anybody Believe" (Ferrari, Keel) – 4:32
6. "No More Lonely Nights" (Keel) – 4:19
7. "The Devil May Care (But I Don't)" (Ferrari, Keel, Jay) – 4:23
8. "Looking for a Good Time" (Jay, Keel, Ferrari) – 3:26
9. "Gimme That" (Keel) – 3:31
10. "Hold Steady" (Ferrari, Keel) – 3:55
11. "Live" (Keel) – 4:46
12. "Brothers in Blood" (Keel) – 3:52

=== Japanese edition bonus track ===
13. "Reason to Rock" (Keel, Jay, Miller, Kenny Chaisson) – 3:13

== Personnel ==
=== Keel ===
- Ron Keel – lead vocals, guitar
- Marc Ferrari – guitar
- Bryan Jay – guitar
- Geno Arce – bass
- Dwain Miller – drums

=== Additional musicians ===
- Paul Shortino, Jaime St. James – backing vocals
- Renée Keel – harmony vocals on "No More Lonely Nights"
- Pat Regan – keyboards on "Does Anybody Believe"

=== Production ===
- Pat Regan – producer, engineer, mixing
- Paul Shortino – lead vocals tracks producer and engineer
- Brad Vance – mastering
