= Lay Down the Law (Keel album) =

Studio album by Keel
- Released: November 1984
- Recorded: 1984
- Studio: Prairie Sun Recording Studios, Cotati, California
- Genre: Hard rock, glam metal
- Length: 32:08
- Label: Shrapnel
- Producer: Ron Keel, Mike Varney

Keel chronology
Lay Down the Law (1984)	The Right to Rock (1985)

Professional ratings
Review scores
Source	Rating
AllMusic	3/5 stars
Collector's Guide to Heavy Metal	7/10
Hit Parader	4/5 stars

Lay Down the Law is the debut album by American rock band Keel. It was the only album to feature original drummer Bobby Marks. Also, three songs – "Speed Demon", "Tonight You're Mine", and the Rolling Stones cover "Let's Spend the Night Together" – were re-recorded for their next album The Right to Rock, although the version of "Let's Spend The Night Together" on this album ends with reprises of earlier album tracks, while "Tonight You're Mine" was re-recorded as "You're the Victim (I'm the Crime)" with altered lyrics.

The album was released in November 1984 by Shrapnel Records to rave reviews, despite the band signing to Gold Mountain Records a few months prior. It was not released on CD format until 2008.

== Track listing ==
Side one

1. "Thunder and Lightning" (Ron Keel) – 3:32
2. "Lay Down the Law" (R. Keel) – 3:44
3. "Speed Demon" (R. Keel) – 3:36
4. "Princess of Illusion" (R. Keel) – 4:04
5. "Born Ready" (Marc Ferrari) – 3:03

Side two

6. "Metal Generation" (R. Keel, Kenny Chaisson, Bobby Marks) – 2:59
7. "Till Hell Freezes Over" (R. Keel, Chaisson, Marks) – 4:25
8. "Tonight You're Mine" (R. Keel, Chaisson, Marks) – 3:00
9. "Let's Spend the Night Together" (Mick Jagger, Keith Richards) – 3:45

== Personnel ==
Band members

- Ron Keel – vocals, guitar, producer
- Marc Ferrari – lead guitar, backing vocals
- Bryan Jay – lead guitar, backing vocals
- Kenny Chaisson – bass, backing vocals
- Bobby Marks – drums, backing vocals

Production

- Mike Davis – engineer, mixing
- John X – assistant engineer
- Mike Varney – executive producer
