= Metal Generation: The Steeler Anthology =

Compilation album by Steeler
- Released: 2005
- Genre: Heavy metal
- Label: Majestic Rock Records
- Producer: Ron Keel

Steeler chronology
Steeler (1983)	Metal Generation: The Steeler Anthology (2005)

Metal Generation: The Steeler Anthology is a compilation album of the US heavy metal band Steeler released by the UK label Majestic Rock Records in 2005. It was issued by Deadline Music Records in the U.S. the following year as American Metal: The Steeler Anthology.

The album contained some unreleased and live songs, singles, and songs from the band's only album, the 1983 Steeler. According to the album inserts, former band member Ron Keel co-produced the compilation because he believed there was a public desire for it.

Though previously unreleased, a modified version of the song "Victim of the City" had appeared on former band member Yngwie Malmsteen's 1985 solo album, Marching Out under the title "On the Run Again".

== Track listing ==
1. "Cold Day in Hell" **
2. "Take Her Down" **
3. "Ready to Explode" *
4. "Hot on Your Heels" **
5. "On the Rox" (Live)
6. "Backseat Driver" (Live)
7. "Victim of the City (Live)*
8. "Yngwie is God" (Live)
9. Band Introduction (Live)
10. "Excited" (Live)*
11. "Dying in Love" *
12. "Last Chance to Rock" *
13. "Metal Generation" * (bonus track, not present in all albums)
14. "Serenade" (acoustic version by Ron Keel, recorded in 2005)

* Previously unreleased
** Original version
