= Metal Massacre =

Series of compilations by Metal Blade Records

- Cover of Metal Massacre vol. 1

Compilation album
- Released: 1981–2021
- Genres: Heavy metal, extreme metal, power metal, doom metal, progressive metal
- Label: Metal Blade
- Producer: Brian Slagel

Professional ratings
Review scores
Source	Rating
AllMusic	Vol. 1
AllMusic	Vol. 2
AllMusic	Vol. 3
AllMusic	Vol. 4
Kerrang!	(very unfavorable) Vol. 4
AllMusic	Vol. 6
AllMusic	Vol. 8
AllMusic	Vol. 11

Metal Massacre is a series of compilation albums released through Metal Blade Records. It is famous for "shedding light" on heavy metal and extreme metal bands such as The Obsessed, Trouble, Overkill, Metal Church, Metallica, Slayer, Virgin Steele, Hellhammer, Voivod, Armored Saint, Lizzy Borden, Possessed and more.

== History ==
In 1981, Brian Slagel, founder of Metal Blade Records, decided to put out a compilation of unsigned, underground metal bands. Throughout the 1980s and early 1990s he continued to release more volumes of the compilations. Metal Massacre XII was released in 1995 and was the final Metal Massacre album until Metal Massacre XIII, released 11 years later in 2006. Metal Massacre XIII differed from the previous releases which featured primarily unsigned bands, containing mostly established bands on the Metal Blade roster.

== Metal Massacre – 1982 ==
=== First pressing ===
1. "Cold Day in Hell" – Steeler – 4:17
2. "Live for the Whip" – Bitch – 5:19
3. "Captive of Light" – Malice – 3:21
4. "Tell the World" – Ratt – 3:16
5. "Octave" (instrumental) – Avatar – 3:48
6. "Death of the Sun" – Cirith Ungol – 3:56
7. "Dead of the Night" – Demon Flight – 2:35
8. "Fighting Backwards" – Pandemonium – 3:44
9. "Kick You Down" – Malice – 4:28
10. "Hit the Lights" – Metallica (listed as "Mettallica") – 4:25

=== Second pressing ===
1. "Chains Around Heaven" – Black 'n Blue – 3:45
2. "Live for the Whip" – Bitch – 5:19
3. "Captive of Light" – Malice – 3:21
4. "Tell the World" – Ratt – 3:16
5. "Octave" (instrumental) – Avatar – 3:48
6. "Death of the Sun" – Cirith Ungol – 3:56
7. "Dead of the Night" – Demon Flight – 2:35
8. "Fighting Backwards" – Pandemonium – 3:44
9. "Kick You Down" – Malice – 4:28
10. "Hit the Lights" (version 2) – Metallica – 4:12

=== Third pressing ===
1. "Chains Around Heaven" – Black 'n Blue – 3:45
2. "Live for the Whip" – Bitch – 5:19
3. "Captive of Light" – Malice – 3:21
4. "Octave" (instrumental) – Avatar – 3:48
5. "Death of the Sun" – Cirith Ungol – 3:56
6. "Dead of the Night" – Demon Flight – 2:35
7. "Fighting Backwards" – Pandemonium – 3:44
8. "Kick You Down" – Malice – 4:28
9. "Hit the Lights" (version 2) – Metallica – 4:12

=== 40th anniversary edition ===
1. "Cold Day in Hell" – Steeler – 4:17
2. "Live for the Whip" – Bitch – 5:19
3. "Captive of Light" – Malice – 3:21
4. "Tell the World" – Ratt – 3:16
5. "Octave" (instrumental) – Avatar – 3:48
6. "Chains Around Heaven" – Black 'n Blue – 3:45
7. "Death of the Sun" – Cirith Ungol – 3:56
8. "Dead of the Night" – Demon Flight – 2:35
9. "Fighting Backwards" – Pandemonium – 3:44
10. "Kick You Down" – Malice – 4:28
11. "Hit the Lights" (version 2) – Metallica – 4:12

==== Note ====
The first pressing was released on Metal Blade Records (MBR 1001), a second pressing on Metalworks Records (MW 6363), both in 1982. Black 'n Blue's "Chains Around Heaven" replaced Steeler's "Cold Day in Hell", which was the first track on the original version of the compilation.

The first pressing of the album features Metallica' s "Hit the Lights" with Lloyd Grant playing the leads, while the second pressing features a new recording of Metallica's "Hit the Lights", with Dave Mustaine on lead guitar. Ratt's "Tell the World" was omitted on subsequent pressings, starting with Metal Blade's 1984 reissue, as they signed to Atlantic Records, while Steeler's song was removed, as they had signed with Shrapnel Records. The 40th anniversary reissue of the album includes "Cold Day in Hell", "Chains Around Heaven" and "Tell the World", along with version 2 of "Hit the Lights".

== Metal Massacre II – 1982 ==
1. "Lesson Well Learned" – Armored Saint – 2:51
2. "Mind Invader" – 3rd Stage Alert – 3:51
3. "Rivet Head" – Surgical Steel – 3:03^
4. "Shadows of Steel" – Obsession – 4:31
5. "Scepters of Deceit" – Savage Grace – 3:45
6. "No Holds Barred" – Overkill* – 4:12
7. "Lucifer's Hammer" – Warlord – 3:18
8. "Such a Shame" – Trauma** – 2:53
9. "It's Alright" – Dietrich – 3:26
10. "Inversion" – Molten Leather – 4:04
11. "Kings" – Hyksos – 6:11
12. "Heavy Metal Virgin" – Aloha*** – 3:01

^ Surgical Steel featured Jeff Martin and Greg Chaisson who reunited in Badlands in the early 1990s.
* The Overkill on the compilation is not the same as the East Coast Overkill on Vol. 5.
** Trauma featured Cliff Burton who later became the bassist for Metallica.
*** Aloha featured Marty Friedman, later of Cacophony and Megadeth.

== Metal Massacre III – 1983 ==
1. "Aggressive Perfector" – Slayer – 3:29
2. "Riding in Thunder" – Bitch – 3:57
3. "Armageddon" – Tyrant* – 5:14
4. "Piranahs" – Medusa – 2:11
5. "Bite the Knife" – Test Pattern – 5:25
6. "Blitzkrieg" – Black Widow – 2:56
7. "Mrs. Victoria" – Warlord – 5:55
8. "Let's Go All the Way" – Virgin Steele – 3:12
9. "Fire and Wind" – Sexist – 3:00
10. "Hell Bent" – Znowhite** – 1:49
11. "The Kid" – Marauder – 3:01
12. "Fist and Chain" – La Mort – 2:37

*Song title renamed to "The Battle of Armageddon" on their debut album.
**Originally listed as Snowhite.

== Metal Massacre IV – 1983 ==
1. "The Alien" – Sacred Blade – 3:39
2. "Cross My Way" – Death Dealer – 3:40
3. "The Last Judgement" – Trouble – 5:03
4. "Taken by Force" – Sceptre – 2:44
5. "Speed Zone" – Zoetrope – 2:41
6. "Forbidden Evil" – War Cry – 4:37
7. "Screams from the Grave" – Abattoir – 3:24
8. "I Don't Want to Die" – Witchslayer – 4:59
9. "Rod of Iron" – Lizzy Borden – 4:29
10. "Fear No Evil" – August Redmoon – 3:52
11. "Destructer" – Thrust – 4:13
12. "Medieval" – Medieval – 3:19

== Metal Massacre V – 1984 ==
1. "Torture Me" – Omen – 3:26
2. "Condemned to the Gallows" – Voivod – 5:09
3. "Call on the Attacker" – Attacker – 3:35
4. "Nightmare" – Future Tense – 3:50
5. "Death Rider" – Overkill – 3:52
6. "Soldier Boy" – Fates Warning – 6:20
7. "The Brave" – Metal Church – 4:27
8. "Destroyer" – Lethyl Synn – 3:27
9. "The Warrior" - Final Warning – 3:49
10. "Crucifixion" – Hellhammer – 2:50
11. "Marching Saprophytes" – Mace – 4:07
12. "End of Time" – Jesters of Destiny – 3:20

== Metal Massacre VI – 1985 ==
1. "Swing of the Axe" – Possessed – 3:50
2. "XXX" – Nasty Savage – 5:26
3. "Executioner" – Steel Assassin – 5:02
4. "Tear Down the Walls" – Mayhem – 5:44
5. "Easy Way Out" – Hades – 4:46
6. "Metal Merchants" – Hallow's Eve – 4:27
7. "Bombs of Death" – Hirax – 2:01
8. "Fountain Keeper" – Pathfinder – 3:52
9. "Welcome to the Slaughterhouse" – Dark Angel – 5:22
10. "Concrete Cancer" – The Obsessed – 3:16
11. "En Masse – Stand or Die" – Martyr – 5:10

== Metal Massacre VII – 1986 ==
1. "Impulse" – Heretic – 4:18
2. "Sentinel Beast" – Sentinel Beast – 5:20
3. "I Live, You Die" – Flotsam and Jetsam – 6:19
4. "Rented Heat" – Krank – 4:09
5. "Backstabber" – Mad Man – 2:53
6. "Widow's Walk" – Détente – 2:20
7. "High 'n' Mighty" – Commander – 4:16
8. "In the Blood of Virgins" – Juggernaut – 4:13
9. "Reich of Torture" – Cryptic Slaughter – 2:33
10. "The Omen" – Have Mercy – 4:18
11. "The Awakening" – Titanic – 4:42
12. "Troubled Ways" – Lost Horizon – 4:31

== Metal Massacre VIII – 1987 ==
1. "Ignorance" – Sacred Reich – 3:50
2. "Hellbound" – Viking – 2:58
3. "Keeper of the Flame" – Overlorde – 4:07
4. "Violence Is Golden" – Fatal Violence – 4:58
5. "Spare No Lives" – Tactics – 2:43
6. "Nothing Left" – Sanctum – 4:26
7. "Into The Darkness" – Gargoyle – 3:44
8. "Death Awaits You" – Ripper – 5:43
9. "Take 'Em Alive" – E.S.P. – 3:53
10. "Intimate With Evil" – Wargod – 4:46
11. "Deadly Kiss" – L.S.N. – 2:58
12. "Bullets" – Cobalt Blue – 3:34
- Note: Re-released on CD in 1994 as a two-in-one, along with Metal Massacre IX.

== Metal Massacre IX – 1988 ==
1. "We Want You" – Banshee
2. "Old World Nights" – Oliver Magnum
3. "Wasteland" – Toxik
4. "Blood Under Heaven" – Dissenter
5. "Random Violence" – Redrum
6. "Definitive Apology" – Pedifile
7. "Needle Damage" – Chaos Horde
8. "Dehumanize" – Faith or Fear
9. "Midnight Madman" – The Wrath
10. "Children of War" – Overdose
- Note: Re-released on CD in 1994 as a two-in-one, along with Metal Massacre VIII. Songs by Redrum, Pedifile, The Wrath, and Overdose were omitted in order to fit both albums onto one CD.

== Metal Massacre X – 1989 ==
1. "Sick or Sane?" – Betrayal
2. "Typhoid Mary" – Solitude
3. "Mirage of Blood" – Murdercar
4. "The Secret" – Confessor
5. "Egyptian Falcon" – Dan Collette
6. "Infected" – Nihilist
7. "Visions in Secret" – R.O.T.
8. "Mercy" – Wench
9. "The Fourth Dimension" – Slaughter
10. "Stayed Up 4 Daze" – I.D.K.

== Metal Massacre XI – 1991 ==
1. "Shipwrecked with the Wicked" – Mystic Force
2. "Circle of Fools" – Epidemic
3. "Dementia by Design" – Forte
4. "Authority Lies" – My Victim
5. "Tormented Souls" – Havoc Mass
6. "The Dream Turns to Dread" – Divine Right
7. "The Great Escape" – Ministers of Anger
8. "Resurrected" – Dominance
9. "Sorcery of the Wicked" – Mortal Reign
10. "Eternal Call" – Nightcrawler
11. "Bad Habits" – Harum Scarum
12. "Consumed by Hate" – Chemikill
13. "Excuses" – Tynator
14. "The Monkey Beat-Man" – Spudmonsters

== Metal Massacre XII – 1995 ==
1. "Paingod" – Paingod – 4:02
2. "Sweething" – Crisis – 3:45
3. "Exhume Her" – Pist.On – 4:14
4. "Godlessness" – Avernus – 7:37
5. "Det Glemte Riket" – Ancient – 6:56
6. "The Allknowing" – Level – 5:12
7. "Wolf" – Tipper Gore – 3:55
8. "Rain Dance" – Gunga Din – 3:52
9. "Cry to Heaven" – Divine Regale – 3:58
10. "#3" – Pervis – 3:01
11. "Anti [Coat Hanger Mix]" – And Christ Wept – 4:03
12. "The Wounded" – Amboog-a-Lard – 4:52
13. "Human Harvest" – Eulogy – 4:57
14. "Twodegreesbelow" – Overcast – 4:48
15. "Arizona Life" – Big Twin Din – 3:13

== Metal Massacre XIII – 2006 ==
1. "Leaving All Behind" – Cellador
2. "Miasma" – The Black Dahlia Murder
3. "Shadow of the Reaper" – Six Feet Under
4. "Swarm" – Torture Killer
5. "Vagrant Idol" – Demiricous
6. "Alien Angel" – 3
7. "The Killchain" – Bolt Thrower
8. "Dead Before I Stray" – Into the Moat
9. "Fixation on Plastics" – The Red Chord
10. "Sterling Black Icon" – Fragments of Unbecoming
11. "Bleed the Meek" – Paths of Possession
12. "From Your Grave" – The Absence
13. "Sigma Enigma" – God Dethroned
14. "The Pursuit of Vikings" – Amon Amarth
15. "Kiss Me Now Kill Me Later" – Machinemade God
16. "One with the Ocean" – The Ocean
17. "His Imperial Victory" – And the Hero Fails
18. "Cult" – Gaza
19. "Echo of Cries" – End It All

== Metal Massacre XIV – 2016 ==
1. "The Traveller" – Metalian
2. "Until Then...Until the End" – Noctum
3. "Bell of Tarantia" – Gatekeeper
4. "The Demented Force" – Assassin's Blade
5. "Denim Attack" – Cobra
6. "The Siege of Jerusalem" – Stone Dagger
7. "Will of the Ancient Call" – Crypt Sermon
8. "The Ripper in Black" – Savage Master
9. "No Tomorrow" – Outcast
10. "Brothers" – Corsair
11. "Cold Cold Ground" – Walpyrgus
12. "Final Spell" – Visigoth
13. "Into Depths" – Ravencult

== Metal Massacre XV – 2021 ==
1. "Masked and Deadly" – Midnight
2. "Demon Wind" – Poison Ruïn
3. "Master of Extremity" – Fuming Mouth
4. "The Trees Die Standing" – Many Suffer
5. "Leave the Light Behind" – Temple of Void
6. "撿骨 (Bone Ritual)" – Ripped to Shreds
7. "Omega" – Rude
8. "Starblind" – Midnight Dice
9. "Warrior Witch of Hel" – Smoulder
10. "In Somber Dreams" – Mother of Graves
