= Christian Mistress =

American heavy metal band

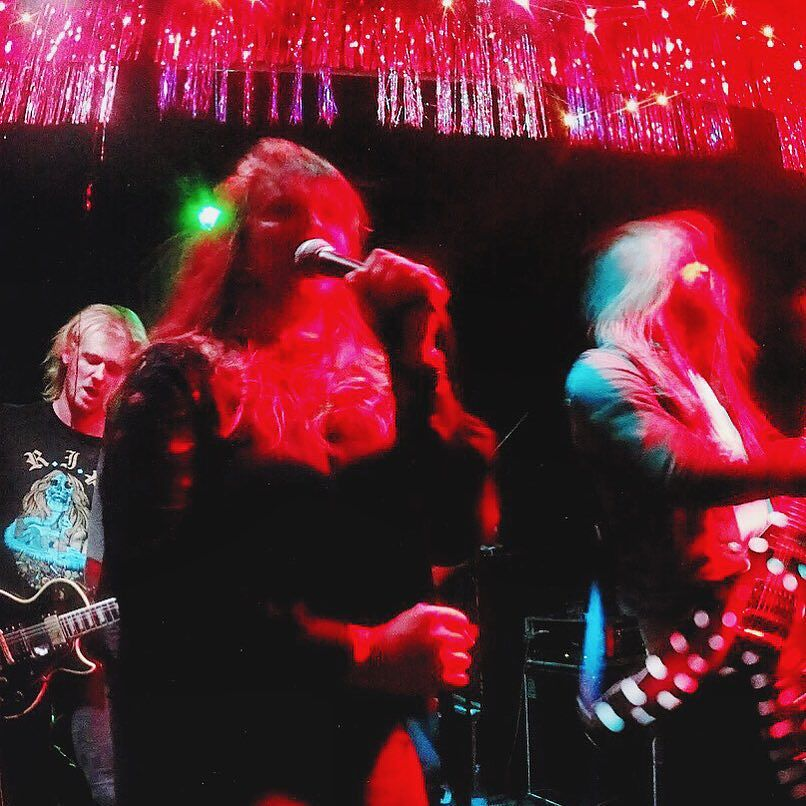
- Christian Mistress in 2015

Background information
- Origin: Olympia, Washington, U.S.
- Genres: Heavy metal, occult rock
- Years active: 2008–present
- Labels: 20-Buck Spin, Relapse
- Members: Oscar Sparbel; Reuben W. Storey; Christine Davis; Jonny Wulf; Tim Diedrich
- Past members: Aaron O'Neil; Ryan McClain; Eric Wallace
- Website: christianmistress.com

Christian Mistress is an American heavy metal band, formed in Olympia, Washington in 2008. The band is signed to Relapse Records.

== History ==
Prior to the establishment of the band, the vocalist Christine Davis fronted the thrash metal band Buried Blood. Ryan and Oscar played guitar in two of Olympia's premier metal bands. After Ryan and Oscar's bands both broke up they decided to start writing and playing music together. The band's 2009 Christian Mistress demo, which cost only $500 to make, and "Mother Of Mercy"/"The Hereafter" single gained attention from many notable heavy metal musicians, including Darkthrone member Fenriz. As a result, the band signed to 20-Buck Spin Records and released their debut album, Agony & Opium in 2010. The band released their follow-up album, Possession in 2012 via Relapse Records.

The band has toured with Thrones in 2010.

On March 14, 2015, the band released a statement regarding American hip hop artist Kanye West's album art cover for So Help Me God (2015) and how they claim he copied their album art for Agony & Opium (2010).

On January 15, 2025, the band announced their fourth album, Children of the Earth, would be released on March 7. They also released the first single and video from the album, "Mythmaker".

== Musical style ==
The band's musical style has been associated with the new wave of British heavy metal movement. According to Pitchfork Media writer Grayson Currin, the band's second album, Possession, combined influences from "proto-thrash, grandiose classic rock, and smoky doom." The band was compared to British heavy metal acts Diamond Head and early Iron Maiden. The influence of Witchfinder General has also been observed in the band's music.

The vocals of Christine Davis were also described as a "combination of the incantatory power of Patti Smith, the raw force of Wendy O. Williams, and the howls of Nicole Lee of '80s Chicago thrashers Znowhite." Her vocals in Possession were also compared to various singers which were also described to be her favourite, including Diamanda Galás, Billy Gibbons of ZZ Top, Michael Gira of Swans, Mariska Veres of Shocking Blue, and Roky Erickson of The 13th Floor Elevators.

== Band members ==
Current members

- Oscar Sparbel – guitar (2008–present)
- Reuben W. Storey – drums (2008–2013, 2014–present)
- Christine Davis – vocals (2008–present)
- Jonny Wulf – bass (2008–present)
- Tim Diedrich – guitar (2014–present)

Past members

- Ryan McClain – guitar (2008–2013)
- Eric Wallace – guitar (2013–2014)
- Aaron O'Neil – drums (2013–2014)

== Discography ==
Studio albums

- Agony & Opium (2010)
- Possession (2012)
- To Your Death (2015)
- Children of the Earth (2025)

Singles

- "Mother of Mercy"/"The Hereafter" (2009)
- "Demo 2009" (2011)

Demos

- Christian Mistress (2009)
