= Steeler (American band album) =

Studio album by Steeler
- Released: September 25, 1983
- Studio: Prairie Sun Recording Studios, Cotati, California
- Genre: Heavy metal
- Length: 36:51
- Label: Shrapnel
- Producer: Mike Varney

Steeler chronology
Steeler (1983)	Metal Generation: The Steeler Anthology (2005)

Professional ratings
Review scores
Source	Rating
AllMusic	4/5 stars
Collector's Guide to Heavy Metal	7/10
Metal Forces	7/10

Steeler is the only studio album by the American heavy metal band of the same name, released in 1983. It was largely recorded at Prairie Sun Studios in Cotati, California, about fifty miles north of San Francisco. It was the only album released by the band until a 2005 compilation album released by singer Ron Keel. After the album was released the band broke up. Guitarist Yngwie Malmsteen joined the band Alcatrazz, bassist Rik Fox would form Sin, drummer Mark Edwards signed on with Lion, while Ron Keel would spin off Steeler into Keel.

== Track listing ==
All credits adapted from the original recording.

Side one

1. "Cold Day in Hell" (Ron Keel) - 4:17
2. "Backseat Driver" (Ron Keel, Mark Edwards) - 3:24
3. "No Way Out" (Ron Keel, Mark Edwards, Yngwie Malmsteen) - 5:18
4. "Hot on Your Heels" (Ron Keel) - 6:35

Side two

1. "Abduction" (Ron Keel, Yngwie Malmsteen, Rik Fox) - 1:10
2. "On the Rox" (Ron Keel, Mark Edwards) - 2:54
3. "Down to the Wire" (Ron Keel, Mark Edwards) - 3:52
4. "Born to Rock" (Ron Keel, Mark Edwards) - 3:06
5. "Serenade" (Ron Keel) - 6:15
- "Hot on Your Heels" contains a three-and-a-half-minute-introduction played by Yngwie Malmsteen
- "Abduction" is an instrumental serving as an introduction to "On the Rox".

== Personnel ==
Band members

- Ron Keel - vocals, rhythm guitar
- Yngwie Malmsteen - lead guitar
- Rik Fox - bass
- Mark Edwards - drums

Additional musicians

- Peter Marrino - additional backing vocals on tracks 3 and 8

Production

- Steeler - arrangements
- Mike Varney - producer
- Allen Sudduth - engineer, mixing
- Allen Isaacs, Mooka Rennick - assistant engineers
- Paul Stubblebine - mastering at The Automatt, San Francisco, California
- All Songs Published By Varney Metal Music Co. (BMI)
