= Keel VI: Back in Action =

Studio album by Keel
- Released: April 7, 1998
- Genre: Hard rock, glam metal
- Length: 36:26
- Label: DeRock Records
- Producer: Ron Keel, Marc Ferrari

Keel chronology
Larger Than Live (1989)	Keel VI: Back in Action (1998)	Streets of Rock & Roll (2010)

Professional ratings
Review scores
Source	Rating
AllMusic	3/5 stars
Collector's Guide to Heavy Metal	6/10

Keel VI: Back in Action is the sixth album by American rock band Keel and the first to feature the classic lineup since their self-titled 1987 album. It features rare, unreleased tracks from the band's previous studio sessions, plus a cover of the Argent song "Hold Your Head Up."

This was the last album to feature bassist/co-founder Kenny Chaisson, as he opted not to be with the band on their 25th anniversary reunion in 2009.

== Track listing ==
1. "Back in Action" (Kenny Chaisson, Marc Ferrari, Brian Jay, Ron Keel, Dwain Miller) - 3:01
2. "Reason to Rock" (Chaisson, Jay, Keel, Miller) - 3:13
3. "United Nations" (Keel) - 4:11
4. "Friday Every Night" (Jay, Keel) - 3:28
5. "Reach Out and Rock Somebody" (Ferrari) - 3:17
6. "Hold Your Head Up" (Rod Argent, Chris White) - 3:11
7. "Proud to Be Loud" (Ferrari) - 3:36
8. "Answers in Your Eyes" (Ferrari) - 4:18
9. "Lay Down the Law '84" (Keel) - 3:57
10. "Speed Demon '84" (Keel) - 4:14

== Personnel ==
- Ron Keel - vocals and keyboards
- Marc Ferrari - guitar and vocals
- Brian Jay - guitar and vocals
- Kenny Chaisson - bass and vocals
- Dwain Miller - drums and vocals
