= In the Beginning... (album) =

Studio album by Malice
- Released: 19 August 1985
- Recorded: 1985
- Studios: Total Access Studios in Redondo Beach, CA; Pasha Studio and Cherokee Recording Studio in Hollywood, CA (USA)
- Genre: Heavy Metal
- Length: 43:32
- Label: Atlantic
- Producers: Michael Wagener, Ashley Howe

Malice chronology
In the Beginning... (1985)	License to Kill (1987)

In the Beginning... is the debut studio album by American heavy metal band Malice, released in 1985 by Atlantic.

Tracks 1, 3, 4, 7 and 10 were recorded at Total Access Studios in Redondo Beach, California and produced by Michael Wagener, while tracks 2, 5, 6, 8 and 9 were recorded at Pasha Studio and Cherokee Recording Studio in Hollywood, California and produced by Ashley Howe.

== Critical reception ==
Professional ratings
Review scores
Source	Rating
AllMusic	3/5 stars
Encyclopaedia Metallum	8/10 stars
Sputnikmusic	3.5/5 stars

Billboard gave the album a positive review, stating the band was "more...than leather and studs", citing the strong production value highlighted by the tracks "Rockin' with You", "No Haven for the Raven", and "The Unwanted".

== Track listing ==
All tracks are written by James Neal, Mark Behn and Mick Zane, except where noted.

No.	Title	Length
1.	"Rockin' With You"	5:01
2.	"Into the Ground" (Written by James Neal and Jay Reynolds)	3:47
3.	"Air Attack" (Written by Mark Behn)	3:01
4.	"Stellar Master"	3:58
5.	"Tarot Dealer"	4:19
6.	"Squeeze It Dry"	4:04
7.	"Hellrider" (Written by James Neal and Jay Reynolds)	4:11
8.	"No Haven for the Raven"	6:06
9.	"The Unwanted"	4:37
10.	"Godz of Thunder" (Written by James Neal and Jay Reynolds)	4:23

== Personnel ==
Credits adapted from the album's liner notes and Discogs album release page.

=== Musicians ===
- James Neal – vocals
- Mick Zane – lead guitar, acoustic guitar
- Jay Reynolds – lead guitar
- Mark Behn – bass, taurus pedals
- Clifford Carothers – drums, motorcycle

=== Production ===
- Ashley Howe – producer, engineer (Pasha Studio, Cherokee Recording Studio)
- Duane Baron – engineer (Pasha Studio, Cherokee Recording Studio)
- Alex Woltman – engineer and recording assistant (Pasha Studio, Cherokee Recording Studio)
- Michael Wagener – producer, engineer, mixing (Total Access Studios)
- Michael Lardie, Wyn Davis – engineer and recording assistant (Total Access Studios)
- Mark Wilczak – mixing assistant
- Barry Levine – creative director
- George Marino – mastering
