= Poison Ruïn =

American heavy metal band

- Origin: Philadelphia, Pennsylvania
- Genres: Heavy metal black metal post-punk
- Years active: 2020–present
- Members: Mac Kennedy; Nao Demand; Will McAndrew; Allen Chapman

Poison Ruïn is an American punk/heavy metal band from Philadelphia, Pennsylvania. The band consists of singer/guitarist/keyboardist Mac Kennedy, guitarist Nao Demand, bassist Will McAndrew, and drummer Allen Chapman. Their most recent album Hymns from the Hills was released in April 2026. The band's music has been described as "dark age punk" and "medieval-minded metallic punk," with a "doomy, dungeon-crawler aesthetic that summons the drab hues and existential dread of the dark ages"

== History ==
Poison Ruïn was originally formed as a one-man do it yourself project by Mac Kennedy, who conceived of the project during the COVID-19 pandemic in early 2020. Kennedy recorded a self-titled EP at a warehouse in Philadelphia and released it in March 2020. In 2021, the song "Demon Wind" appeared on the compilation Metal Massacre XV. More material recorded solely by Kennedy was released in 2022 under the title Poison Ruïn II, Those recordings have been described as "raw" punk mixed with dark synthesized sounds. Kennedy's lyrical themes are based on religion and the historical events of the Middle Ages, combined with commentary on modern political conflicts. Kennedy has also used his interests in medieval fantasy novels and magical realism in his lyrics.

The 2020 EP was heard by other Philadelphia musicians who offered to help Kennedy expand the project into a full band. Demand, McAndrew, and Chapman became full-time members, and all four play on the band's later releases. The full band first played live in June 2021. after rehearsing for nearly a year. The early incarnations of the band have been described as "a compelling curiosity: an anonymous, no-fi anarcho-punk project, kitted out in chainmail and singing about the plight of the medieval peasantry."

The first album recorded by the entire band, Harvest, was released in 2023. That album expanded the band's sound into thrash metal and black metal. Harvest received positive reviews from heavy metal and punk media, with Pitchfork calling it "bracing and incendiary," with "promises [of] transport, whether to a bygone time or a different emotional plane." New Noise called the album "an auspicious, full-length debut that announces the arrival of a major new talent to the world of all things punk rock." That magazine also described the band's lyrical outlook as "both dramatically forceful and uplifting, like using the rallying cry of an eventual victory to guide some battle in a powerful symbol of fervent hope."

The album Hymns from the Hills was released in April 2026. The track "Eidolon" had been selected two months earlier by Consequence as its "Heavy Song of the Week." That magazine also described the band's evolving sound as "a marriage of early punk rock with heavy metal melodicism." Pitchfork noted the album's "cleaner production, catchier melodies, and wider-ranging influences," and concluded that the band "have evolved by integrating influences from across the heavy music spectrum"

== Members ==
- Mac Kennedy – lead vocals, guitar, keyboards
- Nao Demand – guitar
- Will McAndrew – bass
- Allen Chapman – drums

== Discography ==
=== Albums ===
- Harvest (2023)
- Hymns from the Hills (2026)

=== Extended plays ===
- Poison Ruïn (2020)
- Poison Ruïn II (2022)
- Confrere (2024)

=== Singles ===
- "Not Today, Not Tomorrow" (2022)
