= Ron Keel =

American heavy metal singer (born 1961)

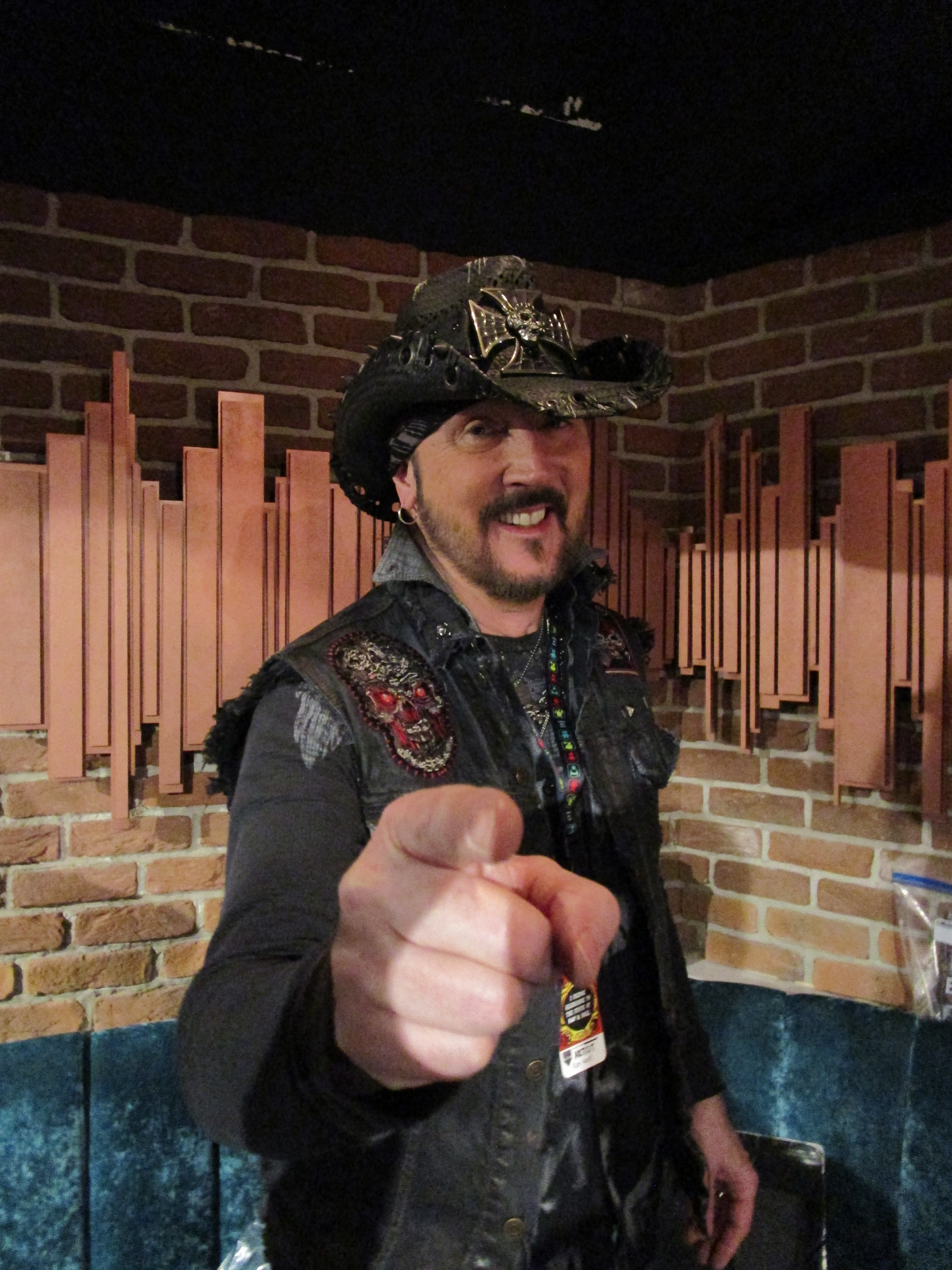
- Keel in 2019

Background information
- Also known as: Ronnie Lee Keel
- Born: Rynia Lee Keel Jr. March 25, 1961 (age 65)
- Genres: Hard rock; heavy metal; glam metal
- Occupations: Singer; musician; songwriter
- Instruments: Vocals; guitar
- Years active: 1981–present
- Member of: KEEL; Ron Keel Band
- Formerly of: Steeler; Saber Tiger
- Website: ronkeel.com

Rynia Lee "Ron" Keel Jr. (born March 25, 1961) is an American rock singer, songwriter, and guitarist. He is known as the singer for KEEL, Steeler, Saber Tiger, and the Ron Keel Band (RKB), and has fronted the bands Fair Game, The Rat'lers, IronHorse, and K2 Featuring Rob Keel, in addition to contributing to the tribute project Emerald Sabbath, as well as being a solo artist singer/songwriter. He is also an author, actor, radio show host, podcast host, and founder/owner/manager of RFK Media LLC.

== Biography ==
Ron Keel began his recording career in 1980 with the Nashville, TN-based band Lust, recording two songs, "Speed Demon" and "Hooker", which appeared on The Homegrown Album compilation album sponsored by Nashville's KDF radio station. He formed his next band, Steeler, in February 1981 and relocated from Nashville to Los Angeles, soon becoming a top draw on the Southern California scene. In 1983, Steeler signed with Shrapnel Records and released their self-titled album. which also featured Yngwie Malmsteen, Rik Fox, and Mark Edwards.

In 1984, Keel auditioned to become the lead singer of Black Sabbath. He recorded some demos with the band, but soon parted ways when the band had a falling out with producer Spencer Proffer over creative differences.

Following the breakup of Steeler and false start with Black Sabbath, Keel aimed to create a premier commercial hard rock act. He formed a new band and simply called it KEEL. The band secured a record deal with Gold Mountain/A&M Records and released their debut album Lay Down the Law in November 1984. From 1984 to 1989, KEEL toured the world and sold 2 million records. Kiss vocalist/bassist Gene Simmons produced two of KEEL's albums: The Right to Rock and The Final Frontier. Both charted on Billboard's Hot 100, as did their third major label release and self-titled fourth album, produced by Michael Wagener. In 1987, their cover of the 1978 Rose Tattoo song "Rock 'N' Roll Outlaw" was featured on the soundtrack for the movie "Dudes." A fifth album, Larger Than Live, half live recordings and half new studio recordings, released in September 1989, and the band announced their breakup shortly after. April 1998 saw a coming together of band members to release a sixth album, KEEL VI: Back in Action, consisting of unreleased rare tracks from the band's previous studio sessions. The band officially reunited in 2008 and toured through 2009 to celebrate their 25th anniversary, releasing Streets of Rock & Roll, an album of new material, in 2010. The band has remained together, in an official capacity, from their 2008 reunion and continues to tour through 2026.

In 1990, Ron Keel formed the band Fair Game, a project he fronted with four female backup musicians. Two of the band's songs were featured on the soundtrack to the 1992 movie Bad Channels. The complete 1990-1991 recording sessions finally emerged in 2000 on the Metal Mayhem Records label billed as Beauty & The Beast.

For most of the 1990s, Ron Keel, rebranded as Ronnie Lee Keel, toured and recorded as a country music artist, releasing a solo album "Western Country" in 1995. He returned to Nashville to front The Rat'lers, who released one album "Thick As Thieves" and toured US military bases throughout Europe. As a country songwriter, Keel's compositions have appeared in dozens of major films and television shows, such as X-Files and King Of The Hill.

Keel returned to the heavy metal music scene in 1997, when he collaborated with Japanese guitarist Akihito Kinoshita on Project One, the major label debut album from Kinoshita's band Saber Tiger. Keel fronted and sang for the band.

In 2000, Keel formed IronHorse, which mixed country with southern rock. He left the band in 2007 to focus on other aspects of his career. He established himself in Las Vegas, Nevada, as a country tribute artist, creating and starring in Country Superstars Tribute, portraying Ronnie Dunn in the long-running live show at Fitzgeralds Casino and Hotel Las Vegas, as well as a two-year run at Golden Nugget Las Vegas luxury hotel and casino.

In 2008, prior to the band KEEL reuniting, Ron formed the band K2, featuring himself on vocals and guitar. The band performed many of the songs from throughout his earlier career.

In 2012, Keel launched his syndicated radio show Streets of Rock N Roll on multiple radio stations worldwide. The show ran for two years until Keel relocated to Sioux Falls, South Dakota, to become the midday host on rock radio station KBAD-FM and frontman for the Badlands House Band at Badlands Pawn, Gold, and Jewelry. Although KBAD ranked as the third most-listened-to station in Sioux Falls in 2016, its owner, Chuck Brennan, experienced significant reverses in his business ventures related to the banning of short-term payday lending in South Dakota. Badlands Pawn subsequently closed in January 2017, and KBAD-FM left the air on September 23. In 2019, Keel relaunched his syndicated radio show, which continues to feature interviews with rock stars and industry insiders on stations worldwide.

In 2014, Keel published his autobiography Even Keel: Life On The Streets Of Rock N Roll (Wild West Media). This coincided with the release of his first rock solo album Metal Cowboy.

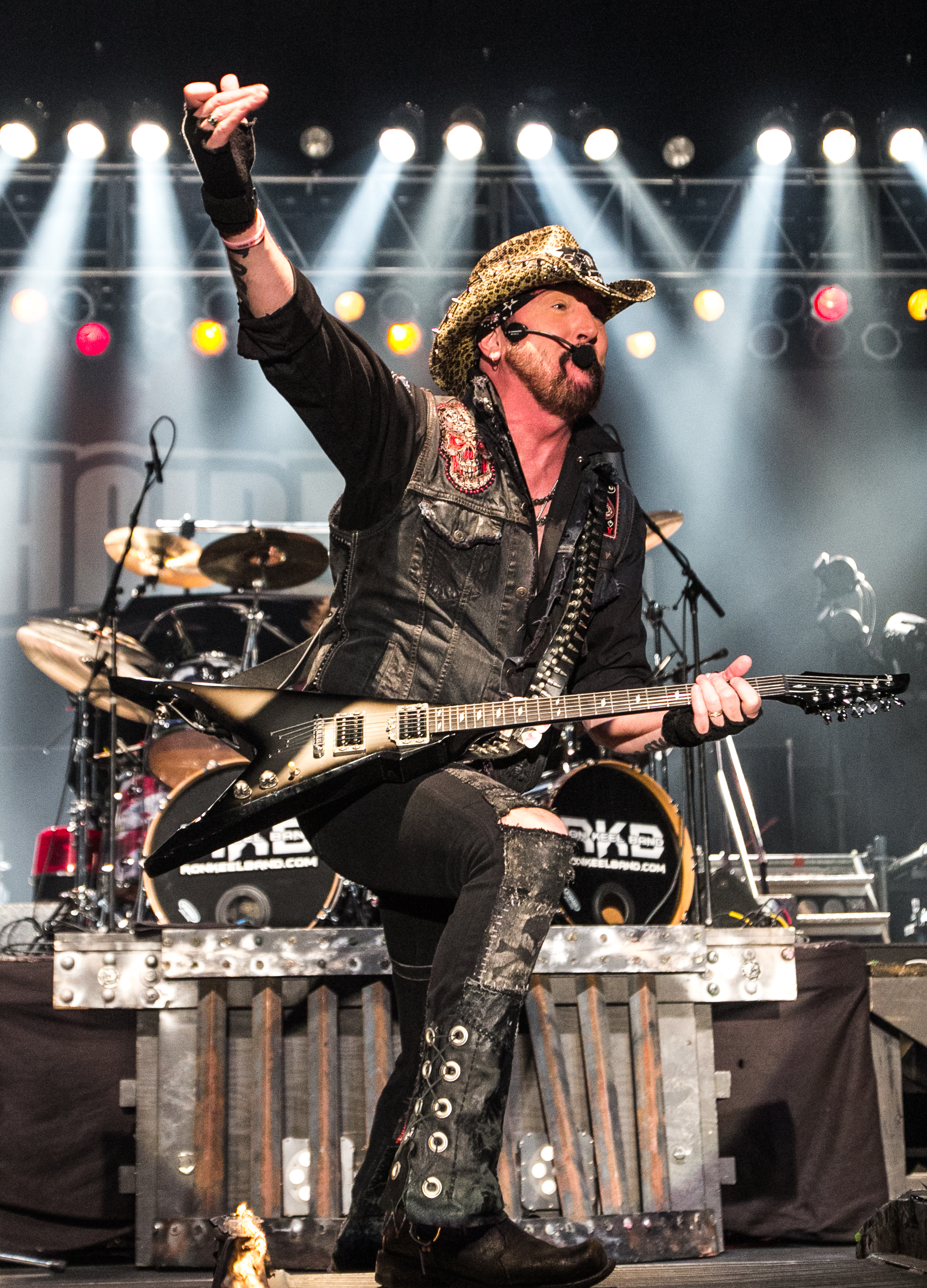
Keel performing in 2017

In 2017, Badlands House Band was renamed Ron Keel Band, retaining the same band members. Their debut album, Fight Like A Band, was released in 2019 by Megadeth bassist David Ellefson's and producer Thom Hazaert's independent record label EMP Label Group, and followed in 2020 with South X South Dakota, an album of southern rock covers, on independent record label HighVol Music (HVM). Ron Keel Band has opened shows for major acts, including Tesla, Night Ranger, Dwight Yoakam, RATT, Warrant, and Sawyer Brown, as well as headlining major biker events, casinos, fairs, clubs, and festivals.

Recent worldwide tour dates included the Monsters of Rock Cruise, Ron's first-ever tours of Australia and South America, the Frontiers Rock Festival in Milan, Italy, the KISS & Rock N Roll Expo in Helsinki, Finland, casinos, fairs and festivals stateside, KEELFEST events (featuring KEEL, Ron Keel Band, and Steeler) in Columbus, OH, and Nashville, TN, plus major bike events like the Sturgis Rally. Ron continues to perform worldwide with his band and as an acoustic solo artist.

In 2022, Ron launched RFK Media LLC, a record label/multi-media company, releasing his new albums, select reissues from his back catalog, and working with other artists, such as Cold Sweat and Crashing Wayward. Ron's 2024 album KEELWORLD featured all new music from Steeler, Ron Keel Band, KEEL, IronHorse, Emerald Sabbath, and solo material.

== Discography ==
=== Steeler ===
- Steeler (1983)
- Come Hell or Hollywood...1981-82 (2020)

=== KEEL ===
- Lay Down the Law (1984)
- The Right to Rock (1985)
- The Final Frontier (1986)
- KEEL (1987)
- Larger Than Live (1989)
- KEEL VI: Back in Action (1998)
- Streets of Rock & Roll (2010)

=== Fair Game ===
- Beauty & the Beast (2000)

=== IronHorse ===
- IronHorse (2001)
- Bring It On (2004)

=== Ron Keel Band ===
- Fight Like a Band (2019)
- South X South Dakota (2020)
- Keeled (2022)

=== Solo albums ===
- Western Country (1995)
- Alone at Last (2006)
- Metal Cowboy (2014)
- Metal Cowboy: RELOADED (2018)
- KEELWORLD (2024)

=== Tribute albums ===
- Lick It Up: A Millennium Tribute to KISS ("Lick It Up") (2008)
- Double Talkin' Jive: A Hard Rock Tribute to Guns N' Roses ("Don't Cry") (2008)
- A World With Heroes: a KISS Tribute for Cancer Care ("Rock N Roll Hell") (2013)
- Emerald Sabbath: Ninth Star ("Die Young", "Trashed", "Hole in the Sky") (2019)

=== Movie soundtracks ===
- Dudes ("Rock 'N' Roll Outlaw") (1987)
- Bad Channels ("Blind Faith", "Somewhere In The Night") (1992)
- Men in Black II ("Speed Demon") (2002)

=== Guest appearances ===
- Black N Blue: In Heat (guest vocals on "Best In The West") (1988)
- House of Lords: Sahara (backing vocals on "Chains Of Love") (1988)
- Rock 4Xmas: (vocal trio on "Rock 4Xmas") (2004)
- Sin City Sinners: A Sinner's Christmas (lead vocal on "Silent Night") (2011)
- Sin City Sinners: Dive Bar Days Revisited (duet with Frank Dimino on "Tie Your Mother Down") (2015)
- Steve Purcell: Ample'tudes (lead vocal on "Angel In Hell") (2020)

=== DVD ===
- The Ultimate Video Collection (2007)
