= Keel (band) =

American rock band

KEEL
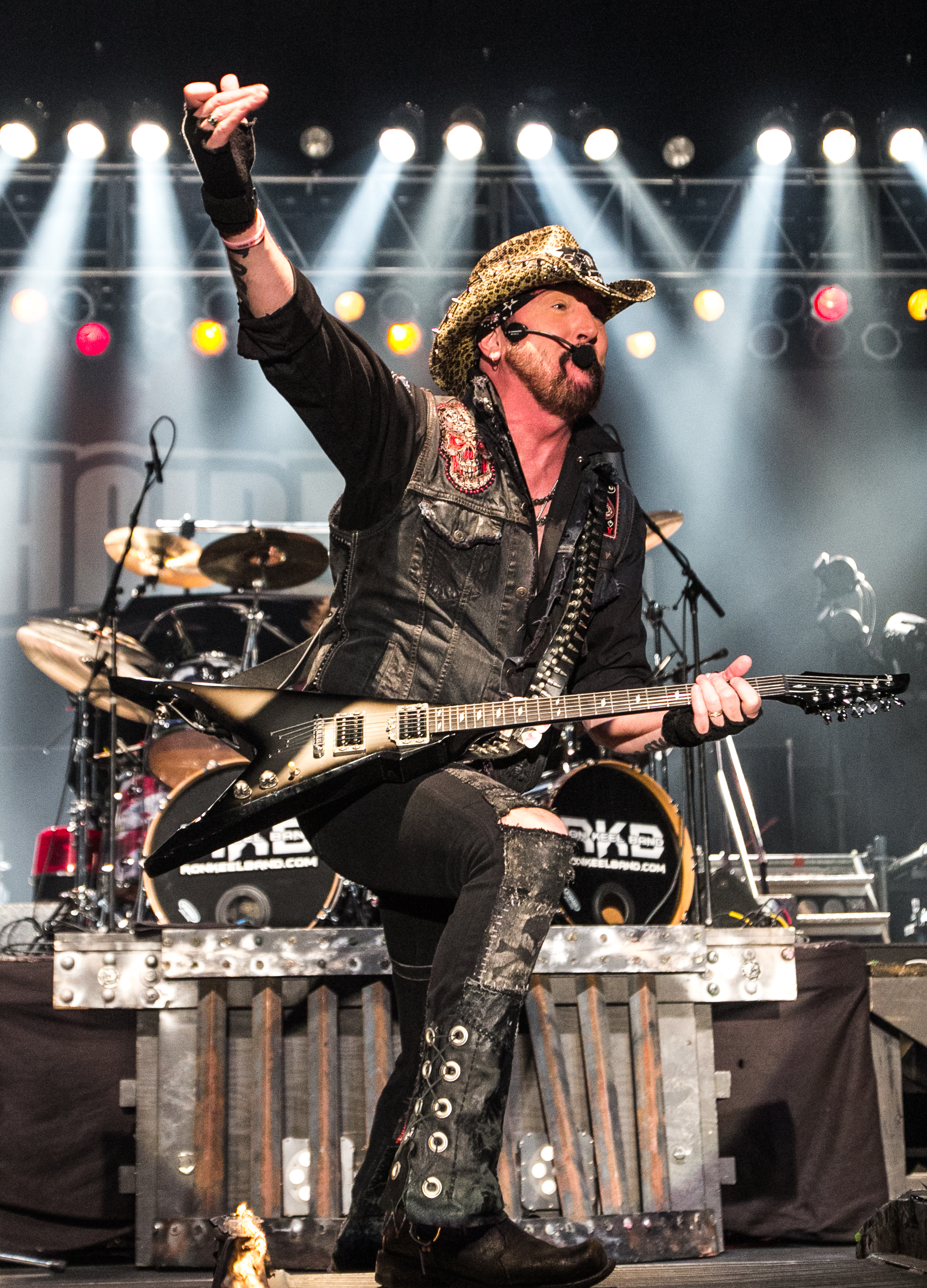
- Frontman Ron Keel

Background information
- Origin: Los Angeles, California, U.S.
- Genres: Hard rock; heavy metal; glam metal
- Years active: 1984–1989, 1998, 2008–present
- Labels: Shrapnel, Gold Mountain/A&M, Gold Castle, MCA, Frontiers
- Spinoff of: Steeler
- Members: Ron Keel; Marc Ferrari; Bryan Jay; Dwain Miller; Geno Arce
- Past members: Kenny Chaisson; Bobby Marks; David Michael Phillips; Steven Riley; Scott Warren; Tony Palamucci
- Website: keelband.com

KEEL (stylized in all capital letters) is an American hard rock/heavy metal band formed in Los Angeles, CA, in 1984. They are best known for their 1985 rock anthem "The Right to Rock". KEEL was active until 1989, with a brief reunion in 1998. The band reunited again in 2008, this time officially, and toured in 2009 to commemorate the band's 25th anniversary, releasing new music in 2010. Although the band is still active through 2026, they have not released any new material since the studio album Streets of Rock & Roll on January 29, 2010.

== History ==
The band KEEL was formed by former Steeler vocalist Ron Keel. The original members were Ron Keel on vocals, former Icon/Schoolboys member David Michael Phillips on guitar, Marc Ferrari on lead & rhythm guitars, Bobby Marks on drums, and Kenny Chaisson on bass guitar. Within months, Phillips left to join King Kobra and was replaced by ex-Cheetah guitarist Bryan Jay. This was the lineup for their 1984 debut album Lay Down the Law,, which includes a cover of the 1967 The Rolling Stones song "Let's Spend the Night Together". After the album's release, Marks left and was replaced by Steven Riley, who subsequently left early in the recording of the band's second album to join W.A.S.P., and was in turn replaced by Dwain Miller, forming a lineup which would remain stable for nearly four years. Their debut album caught the ear of Kiss' Gene Simmons, resulting in his production of their second album, The Right To Rock, released in January 1985. The album's title track became a significant MTV and radio hit, propelling the band to mainstream recognition. Their next and also Simmons-produced third album, The Final Frontier, was released on April 30, 1986. The album included the single "Because the Night", a cover of the song co-written by Patti Smith and Bruce Springsteen, which had been a U.S. Billboard Hot 100 #13 hit for Smith in 1978. Though the music video received avid rotation at MTV and was a hit with rock music fans, the song did not chart as a single.

In 1986, KEEL won the Best Band of the Year award in the second annual Metal Edge magazine readers poll, beating such noted bands as Iron Maiden and Judas Priest.

In 1987, the song "Rock & Roll Outlaw" (a cover of a track from Australian hard rock band Rose Tattoo's 1978 self-titled debut) appeared on the soundtrack for the movie Dudes. Their fourth album, KEEL, was released on June 21, 1987, recorded with producer Michael Wagener. An unreleased track from the album sessions, Ferrari's "Proud To Be Loud", would eventually appear on Pantera's Power Metal album, which Ferrari produced early in 1988.

Ferrari and Jay both left in 1988 after touring in support of the KEEL album. They were replaced by keyboardist Scott Warren, later joining Dio, and guitarist Tony Palmucci, later joining Baton Rouge.

Their fifth album, Larger Than Live, was released in September 1989 with six new studio recordings, including a cover of the 1980 Humble Pie song "Fool for a Pretty Face". Also on the album were six live tracks recorded at The Roxy in Hollywood, CA, on March 18, 1989, including covers of Rose Tattoo's "Rock & Roll Outlaw" and Steeler's "Cold Day in Hell". Later that same year, following the music video shoot for the song "Dreams Are Not Enough", Ron Keel announced KEEL's disbandment.

=== Post-disbandment and first reunion ===
After leaving KEEL in 1988, Marc Ferrari formed the band Cold Sweat with ex-UFO guitarist Erik Gamans, spending two years preparing for the band's debut before releasing the album Break Out in June 1990. Throughout the 1990s, Ferrari wrote a gear column for Metal Edge magazine entitled "Power Sources", offering technical insights on musical equipment. After the 1991 demise of Cold Sweat, Ferrari appeared in both Wayne's World movies as the guitarist for Tia Carrere's band "Crucial Taunt". In 1992, Ferrari founded the independent production music library MasterSource Music Catalog, aka simply MasterSource, employing Ron Keel to write material for the library, with the two eventually producing a large amount of music for film, television, and other media. Later in 1992, he formed the band Medicine Wheel, releasing three albums. Additionally, he released two solo albums and an independent album. Ferrari wrote a book, Rock Star 101: A Rock Star's Guide to Survival and Success in the Music Business, released in May 2002.

Kenny Chaisson teamed with former Hawk and Masi vocalist David Fefolt, guitarist Jim McMellen, and drummer Timothy Yasui to form the band Forty Thieves, recording a pair of demos in 1990 and 1991, the latter featuring former Surgical Steel drummer, Bob Milan, before disbanding. Chaisson also had a brief stint with the band Warrior.

Bryan Jay and Dwain Miller went from KEEL to forming the band Dogbone with ex-Riot vocalist Rhett Forrester, bassist Rob Thiessen, and vocalist Eddie Saiz, releasing their self-titled debut album in 1996. After a long hiatus, Dogbone reformed in 2022 and was resurrected with new music and activity announced in 2023.

In 1998, members of KEEL got together to release their sixth album, Keel VI: Back in Action, mainly consisting of unreleased material from previous album sessions, including the aforementioned song "Proud To Be Loud".

The song "Speed Demon" (from The Right to Rock) is briefly heard in the 2002 movie Men in Black II and appears on Mike Varney's U.S. Metal Vol. IV compilation.

Once the band KEEL disbanded in 1989, Ron Keel embarked on a diverse musical journey spanning country, southern rock, and eventual return to hard rock and metal. His post-1989 pursuits included most notably forming in 1990 the hard rock band Fair Game with four female musicians, before pivoting to country and acting as a solo artist under the name Ronnie Lee Keel, with an album release in 1995 and extensive touring in country circuits, then fronting and recording with the Japanese heavy metal band Saber Tiger in 1996, releasing an album in 1997, and later, in 1998, forming with longtime close friend and bassist Geno Arce the country metal band The Rat'lers (sometimes called Roadhouse Rattlers), which became IronHorse in 2001, releasing two albums. Ron left IronHorse in 2006 and a year later formed the metal project K2 Featuring Ron Keel, showcasing material from throughout his career. Adopting the "Metal Cowboy" moniker in 2012, Ron formally solidified the identity with the release of his solo album, Metal Cowboy, in 2014. Formed in 2017, the Ron Keel Band (RKB), a mix of hard rock and southern rock, featuring both original material and covers, released albums in 2019 and 2020. Since 2020, Ron has actively expanded his "Metal Cowboy" persona by launching his own multimedia company and record label, RFK Media, in 2022. He landed a lead acting role in a 2022 paranormal thriller film Anomaly, released new music in 2022 and 2024, continues to tour through 2025 and 2026 with U.S. domestic and international dates, as well as hosts a radio show and produces his own eponymous podcast.

=== Second reunion ===
In November 2008, KEEL reunited in time to celebrate the band's 25th anniversary. Except for Chaisson, all the members of The Right to Rock era were present. The new bassist was Geno Arce. Their first reunion show location was Club Vodka at The Knitting Factory in Hollywood, CA, on January 31, 2009. In addition, the band played at the third annual Rocklahoma festival in July 2009.

A reunion album, Streets of Rock & Roll, was released in January 2010, as well as a 25th anniversary edition of the album, The Right to Rock, featuring as a bonus track a brand new re-recorded version of the title song.

KEEL continued to perform live sporadically throughout the 2010s; however, according to Ron Keel, the band had no plan to follow-up Streets of Rock & Roll with more new music.

== Members ==
Current members

- Ron Keel – lead vocals, guitars, keyboards, keytar (1984–1989, 1998, 2008–present)
- Marc Ferrari – guitar, backing vocals (1984–1988, 1998, 2008–present)
- Bryan Jay – guitar, backing vocals (1984–1988, 1998, 2008–present)
- Dwain Miller – drums, backing vocals (1985–1989, 1998, 2008–present)
- Geno Arce – bass, backing vocals (2008–present)

Former members

- Kenny Chaisson – bass, backing vocals (1984–1989, 1998)
- Bobby Marks – drums, backing vocals (1984)
- David Michael Phillips – guitar, backing vocals (1984)
- Steven Riley – drums, backing vocals (1985; died 2023)
- Scott Warren – keyboards, keytar, piano, backing vocals (1988–1989)
- Tony Palamucci – guitar, backing vocals (1988–1989)

== Discography ==
Year	Album	Label	US Top 200 Peak
1984	Lay Down the Law	Shrapnel	-
1985	The Right to Rock	Vertigo	99
1986	The Final Frontier	Vertigo	53
1987	Keel	MCA	79
1989	Larger Than Live	Gold Castle	-
1998	Keel VI: Back in Action	DeRock	-
2010	Streets of Rock & Roll	Frontiers	-
