= Steeler (American band) =

American heavy metal band

Background information
- Origin: Nashville, Tennessee, U.S.
- Genre: Heavy metal
- Years active: 1981–1984
- Labels: Shrapnel, Ravage, Majestic Rock, Deadline
- Spinoffs: Keel
- Past members: Ron Keel; Yngwie Malmsteen; Rik Fox; Mark Edwards; Kurt James; Greg Chaisson; Bobby Marks; Mitch Perry; Ron Murray; Michael Dunigan; Tim Morrison; Bobby Eva

Steeler was an early 1980s American heavy metal band formed in 1981 in Nashville, Tennessee by vocalist Ron Keel. The band released its self-titled sole album on Shrapnel Records in 1983. Soon after, Ron dissolved the band to form his band Keel. Steeler is also notable for featuring then-emerging guitarist Yngwie Malmsteen, who left to form Alcatrazz shortly after the self-titled album and launch a solo career.

== History ==
The original Steeler lineup comprised Ron Keel on vocals and rhythm guitar, Michael Dunigan on lead guitar, Bobby Eva on drums, and Tim Morrison on bass which soon moved from Nashville to Los Angeles. In 1982, they released the "Cold Day in Hell" b/w "Take Her Down" 7" single and contributed "Cold Day in Hell" to the first edition of the Metal Massacre compilation which also featured Metallica, Ratt, and Malice.

Eva left the band after a short while and was replaced by drummer Mark Edwards. Morrison and Dunigan would soon exit as well and were replaced by bassist Rik Fox who was recruited after he had placed an ad in Music Connection magazine's classifieds, and 19-year-old Swedish guitarist Yngwie Malmsteen, who arrived in February 1983. The classic Steeler lineup was now complete but musical differences quickly arose between Malmsteen and the rest of the band. According to Fox, "At first, it wasn't working because Yngwie saw fit to insult Ron to his face by requesting to make the songs a little less simple and a little more complex to come up to his playing standards. We couldn't believe what we were hearing from this "new" guy! We kept auditioning other guitarists right in front of him because we all lived together in a piss-poor environment of several gutted-out, roach-infested storefronts, laughingly dubbed 'The Steeler Mansion'. Eventually, Yngwie came around and said, "Okay, I'll play the game your way."

Signed to Mike Varney's Shrapnel Records label, the band proceeded to record their eponymous debut album at Prairie Sun Studios in Cotati, California, north of San Francisco. Metal Forces magazine editor, Bernard Doe, summed up the results in less than glowing terms while praising Malmsteen's incendiary guitar playing. "Not a classic album by any means. In fact, if it wasn't for Yngwie's talents then this would be just plain average. But, buy this album as it will surely become a collector's item in the years to come when Malmsteen is recognised as one of the world's greatest all-time heavy metal guitarists." The album went on to become one of Shrapnel's best selling records, in large part due to Malmsteen's participation, who left soon after the record's completion and joined Graham Bonnett to form Alcatrazz. Malmsteen's stint with Steeler only lasted about four months and nine shows, including opening slots for Hughes/Thrall at the Country Club, Vandenberg at the Roxy, and Quiet Riot at Perkins Palace. Future Talas, Heaven, and McAuley Schenker Group guitarist Mitch Perry, aka Mitch Brownstein, was brought in as his replacement. Fox was given his walking papers and replaced by Ron Murray, previously with Ozz, Burning Rome and Dutch Courage, a band that also featured drummer Randy Castillo and Joe Perry Project vocalist Ralph Morman.

The final lineup of Steeler saw the departure of Perry, Murray and Edwards who were replaced by Kurt James on lead guitar, Greg Chaisson, formerly of Surgical Steel, on bass, and Bobby Marks on drums. However, after the loss of Malmsteen in the summer of 1983, and due to the constant change in band members, Steeler lost their momentum and never signed with a major record label. Ron Keel decided to split up the band and start fresh under his own name, releasing a total of five albums by the end of the 1980s.

In 2005 a compilation album with songs from the single, album, live show bootlegs and unreleased tracks was released by the British record label Majestic Rock as Metal Generation: The Steeler Anthology. The compilation was issued the following year as American Metal: The Steeler Anthology by Deadline in the U.S.

=== Post-Steeler activities ===
Vocalist Ron Keel and drummer Bobby Marks from the final Steeler lineup teamed up with guitarists Bryan Jay and Marc Ferrari and bassist Kenny Chaisson, younger brother of Steeler bassist, Greg Chaisson, under the name Keel. After the breakup of Keel, Ron Keel put together the short-lived Fair Game, a band that featured all-female musicians. In 1997, he recorded Project One with Japanese metal act Saber Tiger as a one-off before turning to country rock with his new band, IronHorse, in 2000. Now residing in Las Vegas, he also performed as part of a Brooks & Dunn tribute in the Country Superstars Tribute at the Fitz Casino & Hotel. Keel regrouped in 2008 and toured to celebrate their 25th anniversary. They remain active with occasional performances at events such as the Monsters of Rock Cruises and the M3 Rock Festival. In 2014, Keel published his autobiography, Even Keel: Life On the Streets of Rock'n'Roll. By November 2015, Keel had moved to Sioux Falls, South Dakota, and began working as the midday host on the hard rock radio station KBAD-FM. After the demise of KBAD in 2017, Keel partnered with several former KBAD DJs to form internet rock radio station KBACK.ROCKS. Keel's new Ron Keel Band, aka RKB, are signed to Megadeth bassist Dave Ellefson's EMP label and issued their debut album in early 2019.

Steeler drummer Mark Edwards teamed up with former Tytan vocalist Kal Swan, and ex-Mansfield members Doug Aldrich on guitar and Jerry Best on bass, in the band Lion. In addition to Lion, he also recorded with 3rd Stage Alert, whose 1984 mini-album was produced by Yngwie Malmsteen, and released the Code of Honor four-song EP as a solo artist. In 1986, he was approached to join the newly reformed Riot and flew to New York to track drums for their Thundersteel album. He decided against joining the group and stuck with Lion whose debut album, Dangerous Attraction, was released in 1987. Edwards suffered serious injuries in a motocross accident in 1989, which ended his career as a drummer. Edwards, whose real name is Mark Schwarz, moved back to Texas to fully recover and has since become a successful businessman, including CEO and Executive Chairman of the Wilhelmina International, Inc modeling agency.

Steeler bassist Rik Fox, who had been fired by Keel and Edwards, quickly formed his own group SIN and released a shaped picture disc single, "On the Run" b/w "Captured in Time", through Azra Records in 1984. Fox was then sacked by his own band who went on to record the Made in Heaven album under the name Jag Wire. Fox put together a new SIN lineup, fronted by former Alien and future The Four Horsemen vocalist, Frank Starr. Although a strong live draw, the band fell apart before an album materialized. Fox subsequently joined Burn and Surgical Steel before forming Thunderball, and taking part in a plethora of other projects. After the demise of his band The Flyboyz in the early 1990s, Fox began to pursue various interests outside of music. In recent years, he has participated in several all-star jams and in 2013 appeared with Keel at the Whisky a Go Go in Hollywood to perform the Steeler tracks, "Cold Day in Hell" and "Serenade".

Fox's successor in Steeler, Ron Murray, joined 3rd Stage Alert alongside former Steeler bandmate Mark Edwards, and recorded the band's eponymous 1984 five-song EP, produced by another Steeler alum, Yngwie Malmsteen. Murray then joined female artist Chey Acuña and appeared in her 1985 video "Hologram".

Malmsteen joined Alcatrazz, featuring former Rainbow and MSG vocalist Graham Bonnet and members of New England and the Alice Cooper Band, recording the No Parole from Rock 'n' Roll and Live Sentence albums, before embarking on a successful solo career with his own band Rising Force in 1984. He received a nomination for Best Rock Instrumental Performance at the 1986 Grammy Awards for his debut album.

Malmsteen's successor, Mitch Perry, went on to join Billy Sheehan's band Talas, followed by stints with Heaven and the McAuley Schenker Group, recording and touring with all three groups. Perry also added keyboards on Aerosmith's 1986 Classics Live! release. He joined Cher on her Hear of Stone tour before forming the short-lived Badd Boyz, with former Rough Cutt vocalist Paul Shortino. In 1994, he joined Edgar Winter's band. More recently Perry has toured with Lita Ford, Steve Priest's Sweet, and Bobby Blotzer's Ratt. He is also an alumnus of the Los Angeles based-Led Zeppelin tribute band, The Moby Dicks. Perry is an avid race car driver and has taught at Skip Barber and Dale Jarrett's racing schools.

Final Steeler guitarist Kurt James was part of the first incarnation of what would become M.A.R.S., and contributed guitars to Black Sheep's 1985 album, Trouble in the Streets, alongside Paul Gilbert. He recorded the eponymous Dr. Mastermind album with former Wild Dogs members Matt McCourt and Deen Castronovo in 1986 before popping up in several minor Los Angeles metal bands, including Steel and Snagglepuss. In the early 2000s, James joined former Anthrax vocalist Neil Turbin's band DeathRiders and was briefly with Mandy Lion's World War III. He was last seen touring Europe with Graham Bonnet in 2018 and appeared on the Meanwhile, Back In The Garage CD/DVD release.

Final Steeler bassist Greg Chaisson also joined a succession of L.A. bands, including Legs Diamond, Hellion, and Terriff (with future Ozzy Osbourne guitarist Joe Holmes). In 1985, he unsuccessfully auditioned for Ozzy Osbourne's band in Scotland, where he met Jake E. Lee who invited him to try out for Badlands a couple of years later; Chaisson recorded three studio albums with that group. After the demise of Badlands, Chaisson joined Sircle of Silence, featuring David Reece, but left before the first album was recorded. In 1994, he released a solo album, It's About Time. In the ensuing years, Chaisson kept busy recording with the Blindside Blues Band, Die Happy, Red Sea, Pat Travers, and Darrell Mansfield, among others. Chaisson briefly united with former Badlands bandmate Jake E. Lee when he joined his new band Red Dragon Cartel in 2014, but bowed out again less than a year later. after being diagnosed with cancer. He now plays in a band called Kings of Dust, and manages Bizarre Guitar & Drum in Phoenix, Arizona.

== Members ==
- Ron Keel – lead vocals, rhythm guitar (1981–1984)
- Mike Dunegan – lead guitar (1981–1983)
- Tim Morrison – bass guitar (1981–1983)
- Bobby Eva – drums (1981–1982)
- Mark Edwards – drums (1981–1982)
- Yngwie Malmsteen – lead guitar (1983)
- Rik Fox – bass guitar (1983)
- Mitch Perry – lead guitar (1983)
- Ron Murray – bass guitar (1983)
- Curt James – lead guitar (1983–1984)
- Greg Chaisson – bass guitar (1983–1984)
- Bobby Marks – drums (1983–1984)

== Discography ==
Albums

- Steeler (Shrapnel, 1983)

Compilations

- Metal Massacre (Metal Blade, 1982)
- Metal Generation: The Steeler Anthology (Majestic Rock, 2005)
- American Metal: The Steeler Anthology (Deadline, 2006)

Singles

- "Cold Day in Hell" b/w "Take Her Down" (Ravage, 1982)
