= Marc Ferrari =

American guitarist

- Born: January 27, 1962 (age 63); Batavia, New York, U.S.
- Genres: Hard rock; glam metal; heavy metal
- Occupations: Musician; author
- Instrument: Guitar
- Member of: Keel
- Formerly of: Ferrari; Cold Sweat; Medicine Wheel
- Website: marcferrari.com

Marc Schumann Ferrari (born January 27, 1962), known professionally as Marc Ferrari, is an American guitarist. He is best known for his work as a guitar player in the 1980s and 1990s rock bands Keel, Cold Sweat, and Medicine Wheel.

Keel was known for its power rock anthem "The Right to Rock" from the album of the same name produced by Gene Simmons of Kiss. The band toured extensively with the likes of Bon Jovi, Mötley Crüe, Dio, Queensrÿche and others before disbanding in 1989. Ferrari then formed the band Cold Sweat, which released its only major label offering "Break Out" in 1990.

In the 1992 feature film Wayne's World, Ferrari appeared as the guitarist of Crucial Taunt, reprising his role in Wayne's World 2 (1993). He followed these films with various TV appearances including "Murder, She Wrote" and "Step by Step". He also performed as a guest on Pantera's 1988 album, Power Metal, appearing on the track "Proud to Be Loud", which he wrote, and "We'll Meet Again". An in-demand writer, he co-authored the track "5 Card Stud" with original Kiss guitarist Ace Frehley's on Frehley's solo release "Trouble Walkin'".

As a film/TV composer and producer, Ferrari was honored by the Academy of Arts and Sciences for his contributions to the 1995-1996 Emmy-Award-winning show "Guiding Light", and is a two-time recipient of ASCAP's "Special Writer Award". He is credited in over 125 film and television soundtracks.

In the 1990s Ferrari wrote the column "Power Sources" for Metal Edge Magazine.

In 2002, Ferrari authored the book, Rock Star 101: A Rock Star's Guide to Survival and Success in the Music Business, considered to be one of the most authoritative books on the subject, offering a unique perspective of the Music Business from the viewpoint of a working musician.

In the early 1990s, Ferrari founded MasterSource, a company that produced and licensed original music for television and film soundtracks and other media. Under his leadership, MasterSource became a prominent supplier of pre-cleared songs, source music and production music. The company was acquired by Universal Music Publishing Group (UMPG) in 2007. Ferrari then worked as a senior executive at UMPG, serving as a division President from 2007 until 2012. Since 2012, Ferrari has continued to produce content for various UMPG production music libraries.

In 2017, Ferrari became a published author for the second time with the release of a children's book called "Don't Dilly Dally, Silly Sally" (Belle Isle Books / ISBN 978-1939930811). The Portsmouth Review praised the book as a "charming tale [that] easily captures the attention of children."

Ferrari currently resides in Los Angeles, where he advises and invests in media and technology startups. He is an active member of the Tech Coast Angels network.

== Discography ==
=== With Keel ===
- Lay Down the Law (1984)
- The Right to Rock (1985)
- The Final Frontier (1986)
- Keel (1987)
- Keel VI: Back in Action (1998)
- Streets of Rock & Roll (2010)

=== With Cold Sweat ===
- Break Out (1990)
- Unburied Alive (2024)

=== With Medicine Wheel ===
- First Things First (1994)
- Immoral Fabric (1996)
- Small Talk (1999)

=== Solo ===
- Guest List (1995)
- Lights, Camera Action! (2003)

=== As a guest musician & writer ===
- Black n Blue - Nasty Nasty (1986) guitar on "Best In The West"
- Pantera - Power Metal (1988) writer & producer on "Proud To Be Loud"
- Ace Frehley - Trouble Walkin' (1989) co-writer on "5 Card Stud"
