= Gold Castle Records =

Defunct American record label

- Founded: 1986; 40 years ago
- Founder: Paula Jeffries
- Status: Defunct
- Distributors: PolyGram, CEMA, EMI
- Genre: Folk, country
- Country of origin: U.S.

Gold Castle Records was an American record label. It was co-owned by music industry veteran Danny Goldberg and Julian Schlossberg (co-producer/co-director of the live music film No Nukes). The label's name is formed from the first halves of each of the co-founders' surnames: "Gold" from Goldberg and "Castle" from Schlossberg, Schloss being the German word for castle. The general manager of Gold Castle was Paula Jeffries, a former executive at Windham Hill.

Its records were distributed by PolyGram, then CEMA of EMI. The label's roster included Joan Baez, Judy Collins, Peter, Paul and Mary, Eliza Gilkyson, and Eric Andersen. Most of them were without record deals before signing to Gold Castle. Don McLean had two albums on the label in 1989 and 1990. Although most of the artists were established, the roster also included Greenwich Village 1980s folk act, the Washington Squares, who released two records, as well as Darius Degher (aka Darius), who released one album.

== See also ==
- List of record labels
