= Gold Mountain Records =

American record label

- Country of origin: United States
- Location: New York City

Gold Mountain Records was a record label based in New York. It was distributed by A&M Records between 1983 and 1985. After 1985, the distributor was MCA Records.

== History ==
In 1985, Danny Goldberg became the label's president. Goldberg founded an anti-censorship group called the Musical Majority to counter the call for rock and roll records with explicit lyrics to have warning labels. He also wrote a book, Bumping into Geniuses describing his experience of the music industry by going through the many stages of his career from journalist to manager. Goldberg did PR for Led Zeppelin, managed the career of Nirvana, ran Atlantic Records, Mercury Records and Warner Bros. Records.

Gold Mountain Records changed its name in 1987 to Gold Castle Records.

== Notable releases ==
- Bruce Cockburn's Stealing Fire
- "The Final Frontier" by Keel
- The Textones' Midnight Mission.

== See also ==
- List of record labels
