= 2Cellos discography =

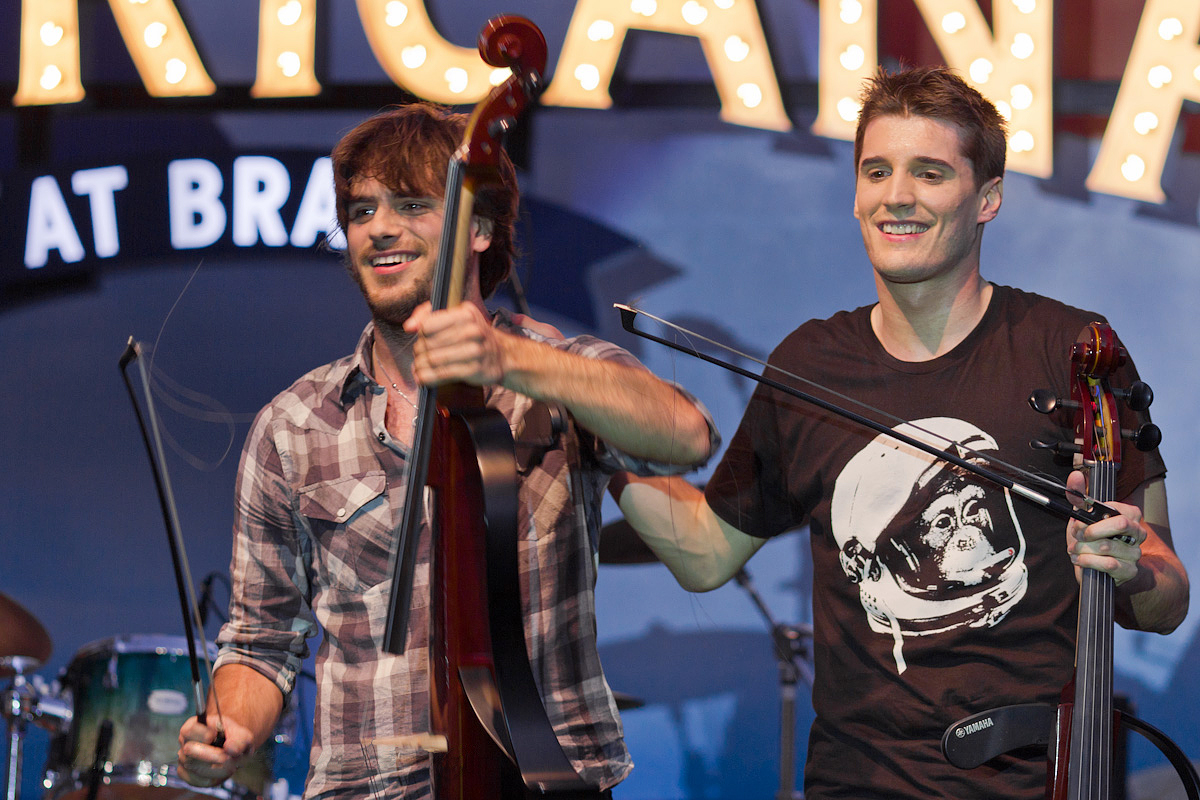
- 2Cellos in Glendale, California in August 2011
- Studio albums: 6
- EPs: 1
- Video albums: 1
- Music videos: 17

The discography of 2Cellos, a Croatian cello duo, consists of six studio albums, one extended play (EP) and one video album.

== Albums ==
=== Studio albums ===
List of studio albums, with selected chart positions and certifications
Title	Album details	Peak chart positions								Certifications
Title	Album details	CRO	AUS	BEL (FL)	JPN	MEX	SWI	US	US Class.	Certifications
2Cellos	Released: 19 July 2011; Label: Sony Masterworks; Formats: CD, digital download, LP	22	69	30	20	46	99	85	1	CRO: Gold
In2ition	Released: 9 November 2012 (Japan); Label: Sony Masterworks; Formats: CD, digital download, LP	40	96	—	5	—	81	174	4	
Celloverse	Released: 9 January 2015 (Australia); Label: Sony Masterworks; Formats: CD, digital download, LP	16	24	—	28	—	—	167	1	
Score	Released: 17 March 2017; Label: Sony Masterworks; Formats: CD, digital download, LP	4	35	43	43	—	63	119	1	
Let There Be Cello	Released: 19 October 2018; Label: Sony Masterworks; Formats: CD, digital download, LP	—	—	64	—	—	—	— (Note: Let There Be Cello reached number 61 on Billboard's United States Top Current Albums chart, not the regular Billboard 200 that also includes catalog albums in addition to current records.)	1	
Dedicated	Released: 17 September 2021; Label: Sony Masterworks; Formats: CD, digital download, LP	—	—	—	—	—	—	—	—	
"—" denotes releases that did not chart or was not released in that territory.

=== Video albums ===
List of video albums, with selected chart positions
Title	Album details	Peak chart positions
Title	Album details	JPN
Live at Arena Zagreb	Released: 21 August 2013 (Japan); Label: Sony Masterworks; Formats: DVD, Blu-ray	56

== Extended plays ==
List of extended plays
Title	EP details
iTunes Festival: London 2011	Released: 29 July 2011; Label: Sony Masterworks; Formats: digital download

== Music videos ==
List of music videos, showing year released and director
Title	Year	Director(s)
"Smooth Criminal"	2011	Kristijan Burlović
"Welcome to the Jungle"	2011	Kristijan Burlović
"Hurt"	2012	Kristijan Burlović
"Highway to Hell"	2012	—N/a
"Supermassive Black Hole"	2012	—N/a
"Il Libro Dell 'Amore"	2013	Tvrtko Karačić
"Technical Difficulties"	2013	Domen Smrdel
"Thunderstruck"	2014	Kristijan Burlović
"Mombasa"	2014	Darko Drinovac
"The Trooper Overture"	2014	Kristijan Burlović
"I Will Wait"	2014	—N/a
"Live and Let Die"	2015	—N/a
"Wake Me Up"	2015	—N/a
"Hysteria"	2015	—N/a
"The Show Must Go On"	2016	Zdenko Bašić
"Whole Lotta Love vs. Beethoven 5th Symphony"	2016	Kristijan Burlovic
"M21 - Forgiveness" (Ryuichi Sakamoto featuring 2Cellos)	2016	—N/a
