= The Manhattan Blues Project =

Studio album by Steve Hunter
- Released: April 30, 2013
- Genre: Blues, jazz
- Length: 47:21
- Label: deaconrecords
- Producer: Steve Hunter

Steve Hunter chronology
Short Stories (2008)	The Manhattan Blues Project (2013)	Tone Poems Live (2014)

Professional ratings
Review scores
Source	Rating
All About Jazz	3.5/5.0 stars
Classic Rock Revisited	A
Danger Dog	5.0/5.0 stars
Power Line	3.5/5.0 stars

The Manhattan Blues Project is the fifth studio album by guitarist Steve Hunter. Released in 2013, the blues guitar album features instrumental interpretations of New York City. It is particularly notable for its all-star lineup of guest musicians: Phil Aaberg, 2Cellos, actor/musician Johnny Depp, Marty Friedman, Michael Lee Firkins, Tommy Henriksen, Tony Levin, Joe Perry, and Joe Satriani. The album also includes a composition by Jason Becker, co-founder of Cacophony.

== Production ==
Hunter left the Alice Cooper – No More Mr. Nice Guy Tour in early 2012 to work on this album. Hunter used his experience gained by his many years of studio recording under the direction of producer Bob Ezrin to self-produce the album. He invited some of the artists that he met and performed with over his musical career to appear with him on the album. Jason Becker, who is afflicted with ALS and is able to communicate only with the movement of his eyes, composed "Daydream by the Hudson" with the use of computer software.
Hunter's previous albums fall under vintage hard rock, but The Manhattan Blues Project eschews that in favor of being a blues album, capturing the rhythm of New York through his "Debussy style" interpretations of images of the city. He interlinked sketches, moods, grooves and full blown songs on an instrumental album colored by prepared vocal parts.

== The guests ==
The first guest Hunter approached to play on the album was bass player Tony Levin. He and Levin had worked together on Peter Gabriel's first solo album and tour in 1977 and Hunter was a huge fan of Levin's playing. Tony played on two tracks of the album, "Solsbury Hill" (from that first PG album) and "Sunset In Central Park". Next came Joe Satriani. Satriani and Hunter had met a year earlier on a benefit show for Jason Becker. Much to Hunter's surprise, Satriani had invited him up to play on his encore and a friendship was formed. Satriani did not hesitate when asked to play the first solo on "Twilight In Harlem". Hunter then asked the cellist duo 2Cellos. Hunter had played the melody on "Every Breath You Take", a bonus track of their 2012 album In2ition which had been produced by Bob Ezrin. With Ezrin's help, the 2Cellos were contacted and they agreed to play cello over the outro of "Sunset In Central Park".

Meanwhile, as Tony Levin had been brought on board, Hunter decided to track down his old keyboard buddy from that same tour, and so Phil Aaberg also contributed. Hunter met Johnny Depp in London in 2011 when, as part of the Alice Cooper No More Mr. Nice Guy Tour, they had stopped in the city for a one-off show at The 100 Club where Depp sat in on guitar during the set. With the help of Tommy Henriksen (Alice Cooper) who also contributed some rap vocals to the album, Depp was asked and he said yes. Hunter wrote "The Brooklyn Shuffle" specifically with Depp in mind, and he also decided to ask Joe Perry (Aerosmith) about doing a solo on the same song.

Hunter had initially asked Steve Vai to play the second solo on "Twilight In Harlem" as they had known each other for many years. But Vai was in the middle of a major project with an imminent deadline and did not have the time. Hunter asked Jason Becker whom he would suggest to fill that spot after the Satriani solo. Becker immediately suggested Marty Friedman, who had been the other half of the band Cacophony. Hunter did not know Friedman, who lives in Japan, but after an introduction though Becker, Marty said yes and sent over the second solo for that track.

Becker also recommended Michael Lee Firkins to Hunter for a solo in "222 W 23rd".

Being close friends since meeting each other whilst recording the David Lee Roth album A Little Ain't Enough, Hunter had asked Becker if he had any compositions that he could add guitar to for his new album. As a result, Becker sent over a programmed piece that eventually became "Daydream by the Hudson".

== Critical reception ==
Glenn Astarita in All About Jazz says "each track on this enjoyable album casts an alternating vibe via Hunter's deft acoustic and electric work, conveying great sensitivity while reaffirming his stature as one of the best in the business".
In his review for Classic Rock Revisited, Jeb Wright notes; "This album is Steve Hunter's masterpiece and if one is not careful, one will find this album quietly creeping its way back onto your playlist, time and time again. One of the most poignant moments on the album is the tune "Daydream by the Hudson" written and programmed by guitar virtuoso and Lou Gehrig disease victim Jason Becker. This collaboration brings the album to a new level of virtuosity."
Danger Dog reviewer Craig Hartranft wrote " Steve Hunter's The Manhattan Blues Project is superb, some of the most beautiful melodic blues rock I've ever heard. Strongly recommended."
In TMR Zoo reviewer, Joe Viglione affirms: "The Manhattan Blues Project is a superb and visionary exploration of the guitar that sets a mood and lends itself to repeated spins".

== Track listing ==
All tracks composed by Steve Hunter; except where noted

No.	Title	Writer(s)	Length
1.	"Prelude to the Blues"		3:11
2.	"222 W. 23rd" (Slide solo: Michael Lee Firkins * Vocal rap: Tommy Henriksen * Background vocals: Karen Hunter)		5:43
3.	"Gramercy Park" (Background vocals: The Karen Hunter Singers from Cloud 9)		4:22
4.	"A Night at the Waldorf" (Piano: Phil Aaberg)		3:18
5.	"Solsbury Hill" (Bass: Tony Levin)	Peter Gabriel	5:02
6.	"Daydream by the Hudson"	Composed and programmed by Jason Becker	1:11
7.	"Flames at the Dakota" (A tribute to John and George * Background vocals: Karen Hunter)		3:21
8.	"The Brooklyn Shuffle" (1st guitar solo: Steve Hunter * 2nd guitar solo Johnny Depp * 3rd guitar solo: Joe Perry * Background vocals: Karen Hunter)		4:01
9.	"What's Going On (Remix)"	Renaldo Benson, Al Cleveland, and Marvin Gaye	5:13
10.	"Ground Zero"		2:48
11.	"Twilight in Harlem" (1st guitar solo: Joe Satriani, 2nd guitar solo: Marty Friedman * Keyboards: Phil Aaberg * Drums: Todd Chuba)		5:26
12.	"Sunset in Central Park" (Bass: Tony Levin * Cellos: 2Cellos (Luka Šulić and Stjepan Hauser))		3:41
Total length:			47:21

== Personnel ==
=== Musicians ===
- Steve Hunter – guitar
- Karen Ann Hunter – vocals
- Todd Chuba – drums

=== Notable guest appearances ===
- Phil Aaberg – piano, keyboards
- 2Cellos – cellos – Luka Šulić and Stjepan Hauser
- Johnny Depp – guitar
- Marty Friedman – guitar
- Michael Lee Firkins – slide guitar
- Tommy Henriksen – vocal rap
- Tony Levin – bass guitar
- Joe Perry – guitar
- Joe Satriani – guitar
- Todd Chuba – drums

=== Production and additional personnel ===
- Produced by Steve Hunter for deaconrecords
- Composer, programming – Jason Becker
- Cover design – Karen Hunter
- Photography – Michael Woodall
- Mastered by Dave Shirk for Sonorous Mastering
