= Live at Arena Zagreb =

2Cellos - Live at Arena Zagreb

Video by 2Cellos
- Released: 21 August 2013
- Recorded: 13 June 2012
- Genre: classical, cello rock
- Length: 79 minutes
- Label: Sony Masterworks
- Director: Kristijan Burlović

Live at Arena Zagreb is a live concert video from the Croatian cello duo, 2Cellos, filmed at Croatia's Arena Zagreb, in 2012. It was released on 21 August 2013 to DVD.

The concert is notable for being their "homecoming" show and their biggest solo concert at that point, with over 20,000 fans attending.

2Cellos were accompanied by the Zagreb Philharmonic Orchestra while they performed classical repertoire. The concert also included songs from their self-titled debut album and their second album, In2ition.

== Setlist ==
1. Benedictus
2. Élégie in C Minor, Op. 24
3. Gabriel's Oboe
4. Oblivion
5. Welcome to the Jungle
6. Purple Haze
7. Resistance
8. Californication
9. With Or Without You
10. Where The Streets Have No Name
11. Viva La Vida
12. Human Nature
13. Smooth Criminal
14. You Shook Me All Night Long
15. Highway to Hell
16. Back In Black
17. When I Come Around
18. Smells Like Teen Spirit
19. Fields of Gold
20. Hurt
21. End Credits
22. Behind the Scenes

== Personnel ==
2Cellos

- Luka Šulić – cello
- Stjepan Hauser – cello

Additional personnel

- Ivo Lipanović – conductor
- Zagreb Philharmonic Orchestra
- Dušan Kranjc – drums
