= Sulic =

Sulic may refer to:

- Šulić (pronounced [ˈʃuːlit͡ɕ]), a surname found in Croatia
- Sulić (pronounced [ˈsuːlit͡ɕ]), a surname found in Croatia
