= Chapter 11 (disambiguation) =

Chapter 11, Title 11, United States Code is a component of United States bankruptcy laws.

Chapter Eleven, Chapter 11, or Chapter XI may also refer to:

== Music ==
- Chapter Eleven (album), an album by Michael Lee Firkins

== Television ==
- "Chapter 11" (Eastbound & Down)
- "Chapter 11" (House of Cards)
- "Chapter 11" (Legion)
- "Chapter 11" (Star Wars: Clone Wars), an episode of Star Wars: Clone Wars
- "Chapter 11: The Heiress", an episode of The Mandalorian
- "Chapter Eleven" (Boston Public)
- "Chapter Eleven: A Midwinter's Tale", an episode of Chilling Adventures of Sabrina
- "Chapter Eleven: To Riverdale and Back Again", an episode of Riverdale
- "Chapter Eleven: Who Can I Turn To?", an episode of Katy Keene

== Other uses ==
- Chapter XI of the United Nations Charter
