= Lana Trotovšek =

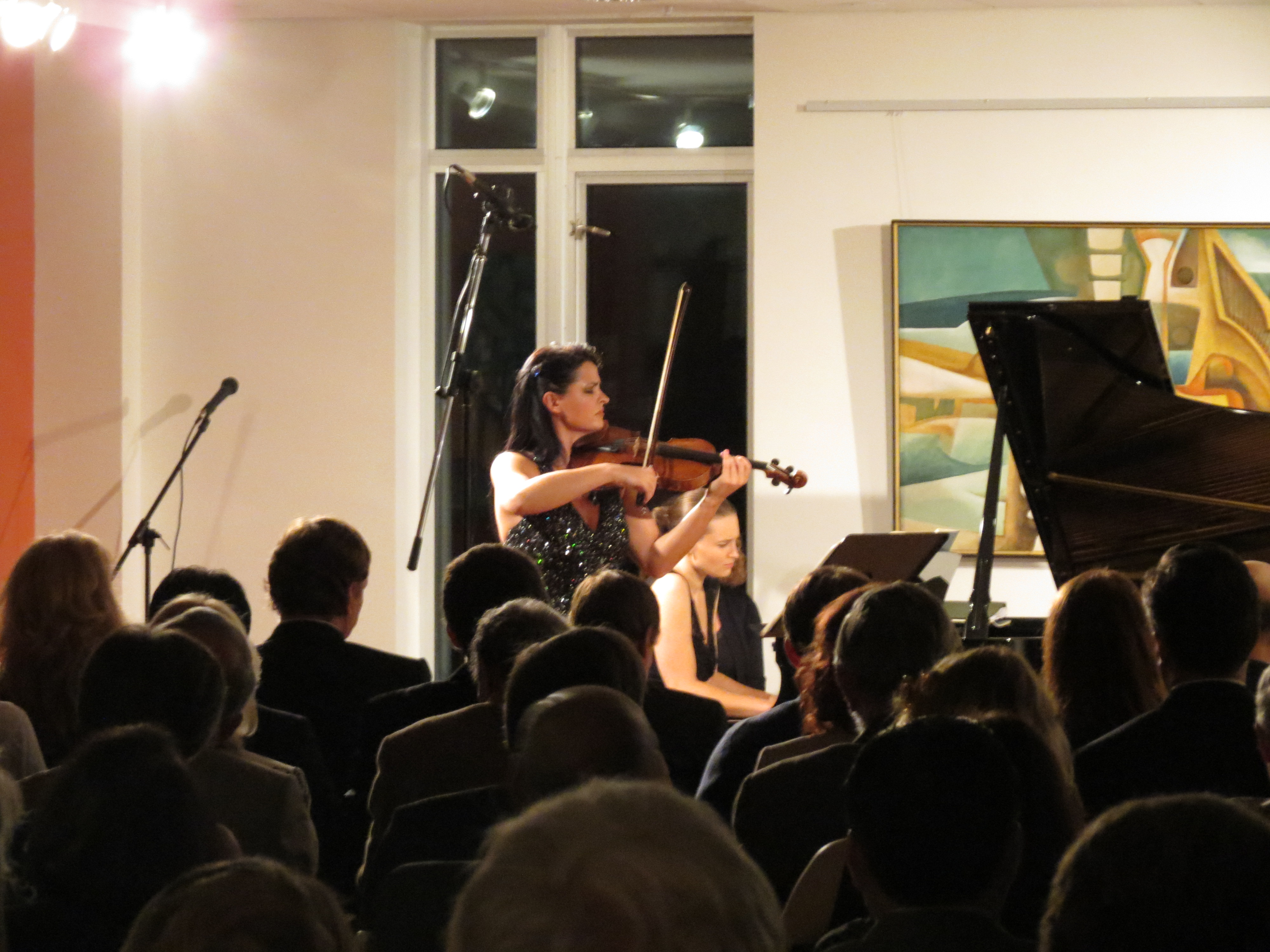
- Lana Trotovšek - During a concert

Background information
- Born: Ljubljana, Slovenia
- Genres: Classical, chamber music
- Occupation: Violinist
- Instrument: Violin

Lana Trotovšek is a London-based Slovenian violinist. She is a soloist and chamber musician who has performed around the world. She plays on a violin made by Pietro Antonio dalla Costa from Treviso in 1750.

== Early life and education ==
Lana Trotovšek was born to a family of musicians in Ljubljana, Slovenia, and started to play the violin when she was 4. At the age of 17, she was taken under the auspices of Ruggiero Ricci, who was her mentor for 18 months in Salzburg (Mozarteum). While discovered by Ricci, she was also studying at the Academy of Music of University of Ljubljana, where her professors included Volodja Balžalorsky and Primoz Novsak.

In London, she studied at Trinity College of Music with Vasko Vasilev, Boris Brovtsyn, Rivka Golani, and at the Royal College of Music with Itzhak Rashkovsky.

She has also been guided by Ivry Gitlis, Ida Haendel, Pierre Amoyal, György Pauk, Tasmin Little, Pavel Berman, Lev Guelbard, Rudolf Gahler, Igor Ozim, Bernard Greenhouse, and Menahem Pressler.

== Career ==
She has made her debut with Valery Gergiev and Mariinsky Theatre Orchestra in 2012 with Violin Concerto No. 1 (Prokofiev) . She has performed in Konzerthaus, Vienna, Teatro la Fenice Venice, Concertgebouw Amsterdam, Muziekgebouw Eindhoven, Wigmore Hall London, St. John's Smiths Square London, London's Kings Place and elsewhere. In 2016 she debuted with London Symphony Orchestra and Gianandrea Noseda.

Her performances have been broadcast on BBC Radio 3, Arte TV (France), and RTV Slovenia. She has recorded for Signum, Champs Hill, Meridian Records, SOMM recordings, ZKP rtv Slovenia and Hedone records.

Trotovsek has been featured artist at renowned international festivals including Rheingau Musik Festival, Aix-en-Provence Festival, Festival International de Santander, Emilia Romagna Festival, Ljubljana Festival, Dubrovnik Festival, Kissinger Sommer, St Magnus Festival, and Aldeburgh Festival.

She was the violinist of the Greenwich Trio, whose cellist was Stjepan Hauser (now member of the 2Cellos), while the pianist was Yoko Misumi.

From 2011 to 2013, Trotovsek was the leading violinist of the Badke Quartet, the winners of Melbourne International Chamber Music Competition.

== Awards ==
Trotovsek is the recipient of numerous awards and prizes, both in her native country and the United Kingdom. In 2009, she won the First Prize from the Trinity College of Music in a competition of 50 soloists, as well as the First Prize from the Beethoven Piano Society of Europe, together with a pianist Gayane Gasparyan.

She was awarded the New York Friends of TCM Prize and the Solo String Bach Competition. In 2008, she won the First Prize of "Dino Ciani" International Music Competition for Soloists in Italy. In her native Slovenia, she was awarded the highest award for arts of all universities in the country, the Prešeren Award.
