= Celloverse =

Studio album by 2Cellos
- Released: January 9, 2015
- Recorded: 2014
- Studios: Morris Studio, Zagreb
- Genres: Rock, cello rock, instrumental rock, classical crossover, classical
- Length: 47:53
- Label: Sony Masterworks

2Cellos chronology
In2ition (2012)	Celloverse (2015)	Score (2017)

Celloverse is the third studio album by Croatian cello duo 2Cellos. It was released on January 9, 2015, in Australia, January 21, 2015, in Japan and February 9, 2015, in the UK.

== Track listing ==
No.	Title	Writer(s)	Arranger(s)	Length
1.	"The Trooper"	Steve Harris	Luka Šulić, Stjepan Hauser	4:34
2.	"I Will Wait"	Marcus Mumford	Šulić, Hauser	4:07
3.	"Thunderstruck (Intro)"	Šulić, Hauser	Šulić, Hauser	0:32
4.	"Thunderstruck"	Angus Young, Malcolm Young	Šulić, Hauser	3:42
5.	"Hysteria"	Muse	Šulić, Hauser	2:35
6.	"Shape of My Heart"	Sting	Šulić, Hauser	4:36
7.	"Mombasa"	Hans Zimmer	Šulić, Hauser	3:37
8.	"Time"	Hans Zimmer	Šulić, Hauser	4:18
9.	"Wake Me Up"	Avicii	Šulić, Hauser	4:09
10.	"They Don't Care About Us"	Michael Jackson	Šulić, Hauser	3:25
11.	"Live and Let Die" (feat. Lang Lang)	Paul McCartney, Linda McCartney	Šulić, Hauser	2:59
12.	"Street Spirit (Fade Out)"	Radiohead	Šulić, Hauser	4:40
13.	"Celloverse"	Šulić, Hauser	Šulić, Hauser	4:21
Total length:				47:53

Japanese bonus track
No.	Title	Writer(s)	Arranger(s)	Length
14.	"Satisfaction"	The Rolling Stones	Šulić, Hauser	2:40

== Charts ==
The album reached number 43 on the UK album chart, their only release to do so.
