= Christopher Ball =

British musician (1936–2022)

Christopher Ball (7 July 1936 – 7 April 2022) was a British composer, arranger, conductor, clarinetist and recorder player.

== Early life and education ==
Ball was born in Leeds in 1936. His father had trained in piano tuning and his mother was an amateur pianist. Ball attended Roundhay School and was taught clarinet by Michael Saxton. He studied clarinet as well as piano at the Royal Manchester College of Music (now the Royal Northern College of Music), where his clarinet teacher was with Norman MacDonald, and then continued his studies of the instrument at the Royal Academy of Music with the clarinetists Jack Brymer, Reginald Kell and Gervase de Peyer. He also studied conducting with Maurice Miles. After winning a Gulbenkian Scholarship at the Guildhall School of Music and Drama, he took part in conducting masterclasses with Pierre Monteux, Constantin Silvestri, Sir Charles Mackerras, Norman Del Mar and Sir Georg Solti (whose masterclass was televised), and won the Guildhall School's Ricordi Conducting Prize.

== Career ==
=== Conductor and performer ===
Ball began his career freelancing as an orchestral clarinetist in the Halle Orchestra under Sir John Barbirolli, while still a student at the Royal Manchester College of Music. In 1964 he became an apprentice conductor of the BBC Northern Symphony Orchestra (now the BBC Philharmonic Orchestra) and then assistant conductor of the Vancouver Symphony Orchestra. He was one of several conductors of the Royal Ballet, Covent Garden (1968–70).

In 1971 Ball founded the Praetorius Consort, an early music ensemble, which he directed. The consort performed at the Wigmore Hall and elsewhere in London as well as at festivals in Europe during the 1970s. It made recordings for EMI, BBC Records and Decca, including Medieval Paris: Music of the City. In 1973 he founded the London Baroque Trio, performing on recorder with Mary Verney (harpsichord) and Peter Vel (bass viol). They made their Wigmore Hall debut in 1974; Joan Chissell, in a review for The Times, praised Ball's playing for its "cooing tone and agility", writing that he "almost transcended the treble recorder's limitations". He played a Bressan treble recorder dated around 1710.

=== Academic ===
Ball was a professor of clarinet and recorder at the Royal Academy of Music for 41 years. His notable students include the clarinetist Leslie Craven.

=== Composer ===
In 1981 Ball began a ten-year association with the BBC Midland Radio Orchestra, during which the BBC commissioned many light orchestral compositions and arrangements from him. These include A Summer Day, one of Ball's earliest compositions, which has been broadcast more than a hundred times.

From the mid-1990s Ball concentrated on composing. Starting with a recorder concerto entitled The Piper of Dreams (1995), he wrote a total of nine concertos for various instruments: oboe, clarinet (2006), flute, French horn, cor anglais (English horn), violin, and two for cello (dedicated to the Croatian cellist Stjepan Hauser of 2Cellos; the first dated 2010). His other recorded works include a Clarinet Quintet, Caprice on a Baroque Theme, the wind quintet Scenes From A Comedy, and Invocations of Pan. He also wrote multiple works for solo recorder and various recorder ensembles.

Stephen H. Smith, in a recent book on 20th-century English composers, describes Ball's work as in the "tonal, easy-listening tradition". Alan Titchmarsh describes Ball as an "accomplished contemporary composer" and praises his arrangement, The Lark in the Clear Air. Jack Sullivan, in a review for American Record Guide, describes Ball's concertos for wind instruments as "unremittingly pleasant", describing them as avoiding all dissonance and characterised by a "benevolent eclecticism that gives an amiable nod to the least forced moments in 20th Century music". Andrew Achenbach, in a critical review of two recordings for Gramophone, found the Cello Concerto no. 1 overlong, and described it and the concertos for horn and oboe as being written in an "innocuously tuneful, wanly pastoral idiom stifling in its timidity".

Ball died on 7 April 2022 at Denville Hall.
