= Central Park in popular culture =

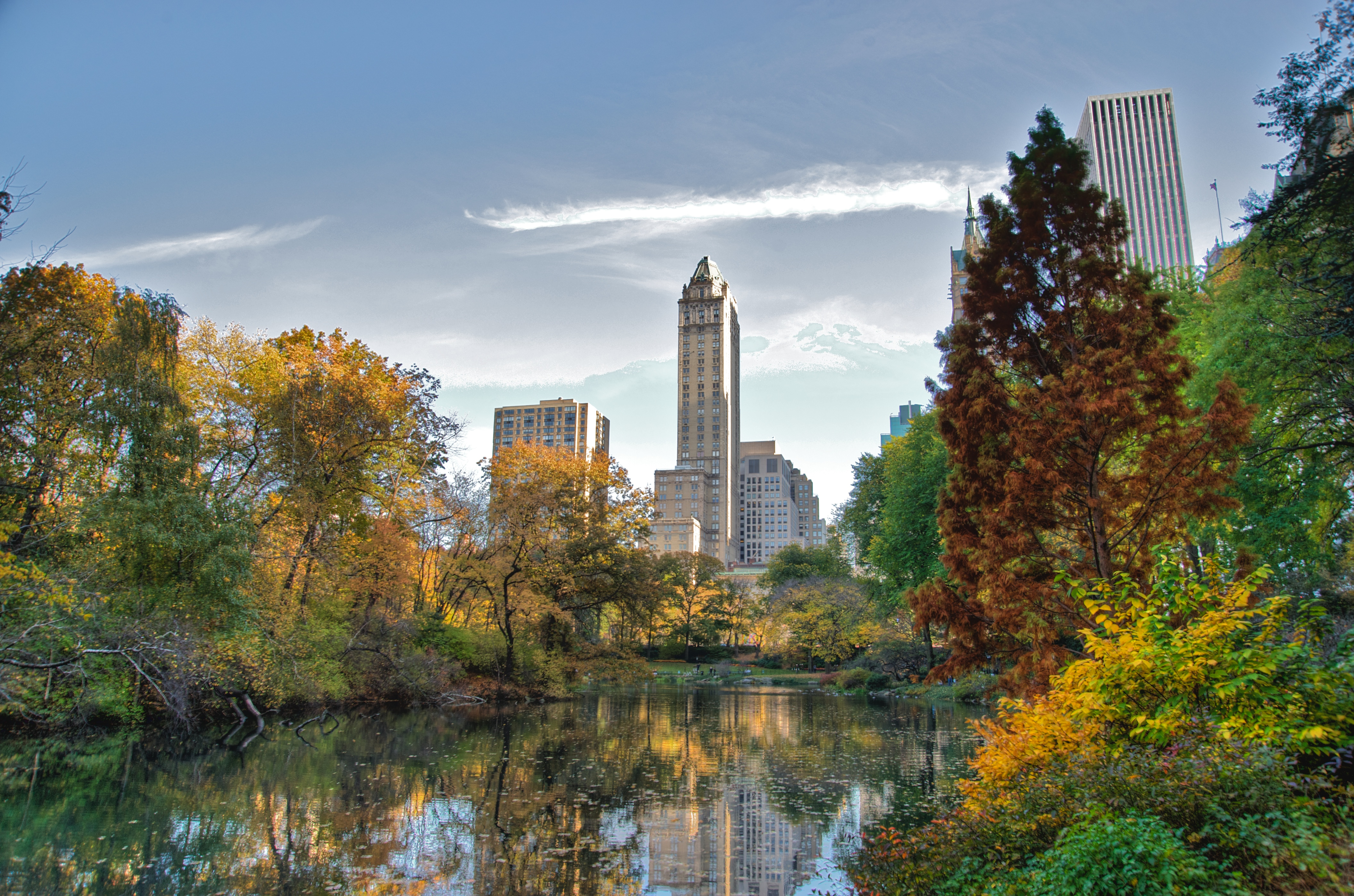
The Pond and Hallett Nature Sanctuary in Central Park

Central Park is an urban park in Manhattan, New York City. Central Park is the most visited urban park in the United States, with 40 million visitors in 2013, and one of the most filmed locations in the world. A landmark of New York City since 1857, it has been featured in numerous films, TV shows, songs, video games, books, photographs, and artwork.

== Painting ==
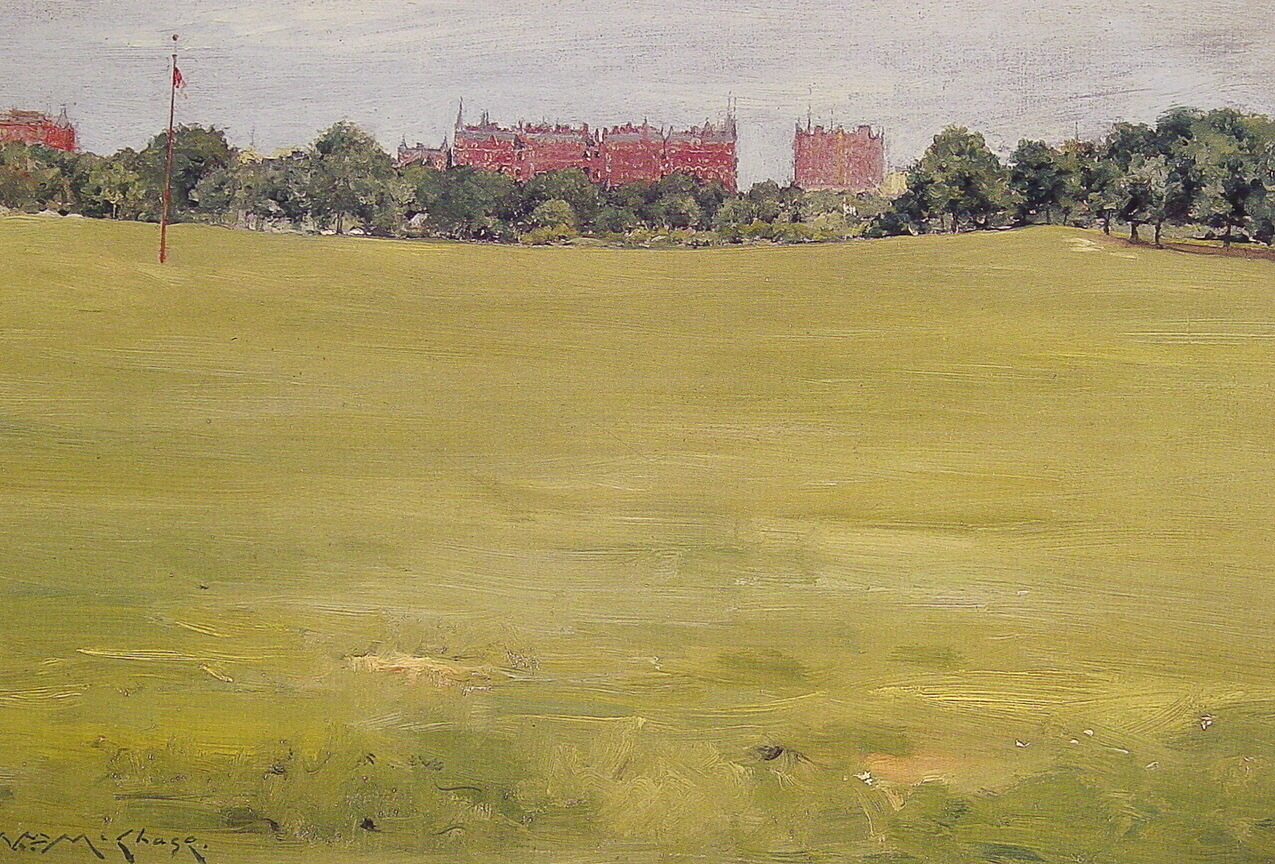
William Merritt Chase, View from Central Park (1889)

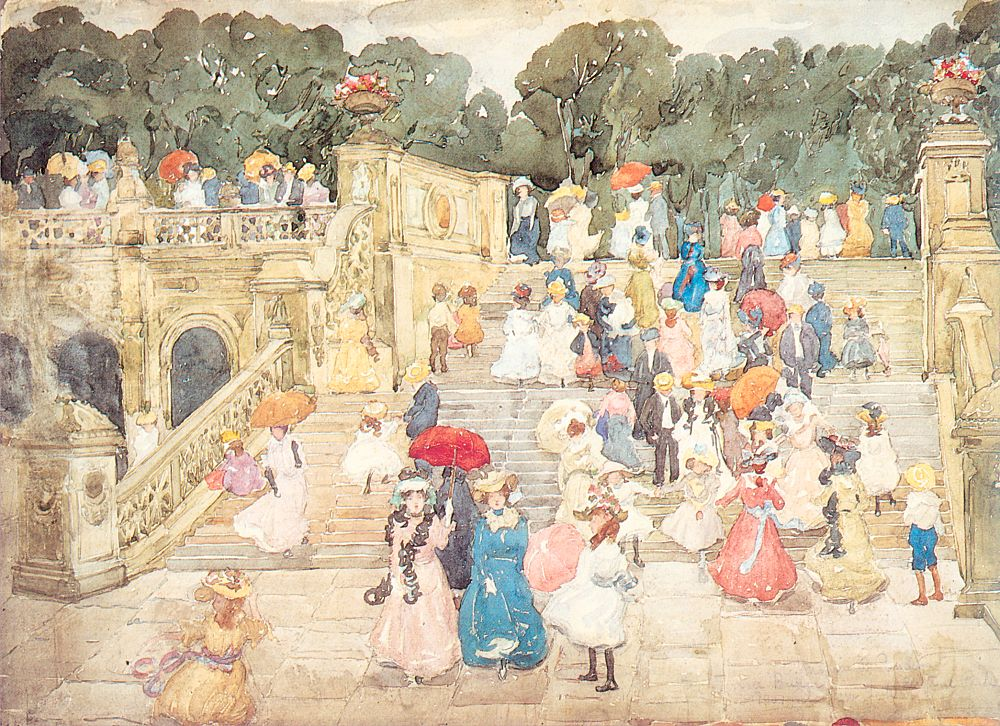
Maurice Prendergast, The Mall, Central Park (1901)

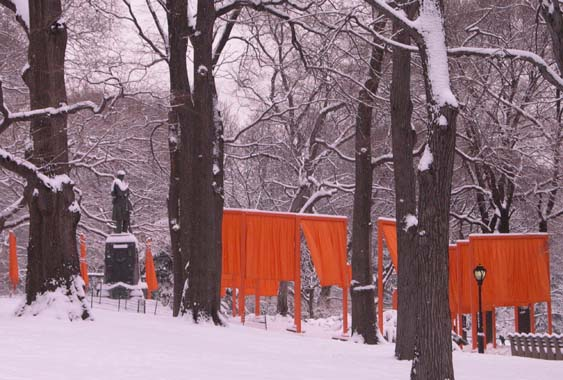
The Gates (2005)

- William Merritt Chase painted a portrait of Central Park in 1889.
- Pierre Alechinsky represented the Mall in Central Park in a 1965 acrylic painting.
- Maurice Prendergast represented Central Park in several paintings.

== Photography ==
- Elliott Erwitt took photographs of dogs in Central Park in 1974.
- Bruce Davidson's photobook Central Park (1995) was a four-year exploration of the park.
- Tod Papageorge chronicled the park over several decades for his photobook Passing Through Eden (2007).

== Literature ==
- The writer Evan H Rhodes published The Prince of Central Park, a 1975 novel that describes the life of an 11-year-old in the park.
- In the book The Catcher in the Rye, the main character, Holden Caulfield, often wonders what happens to the ducks and fish in Central Park when the ice begins to form in winter. He also spends time in the park in parts of the novel.

== Films and TV ==
Central Park, as a universal symbol of the city, appeared and continues to appear in film productions, as well as in television series. The first film to feature Central Park was Romeo and Juliet, in 1908. Since then there have been at least 305 films which feature Central Park, making it the most filmed location for films. Many Academy Award winning films feature a scene in the park.

== Music ==
- Central Park in the Dark, composed in 1906, is a work of American composer Charles Ives.
- The first album by Nina Simone, Little Girl Blue, has a song titled Central Park Blues.
- A John Coltrane song is called "Central Park West".
- Steve Hunter released a blues guitar instrumental titled "Sunset in Central Park" on his 2013 CD The Manhattan Blues Project

== Video games ==
Central Park appears in the 2001 video game Grand Theft Auto III and its 2005 sequel Liberty City Stories, being referred to as Belleville Park.

Central park appears in the Marvel's Spider-Man , Marvel's Spider-Man Remastered, Spider-Man 2 games as central park itself.
