= Volodja Balžalorsky =

Slovenian violinist

Volodja Balžalorsky (born 1956) is a Slovenian violinist. He is Professor of Violin at the Music Academy at University of Ljubljana. His pupils, including Lana Trotovšek, have won many national and international first prizes and awards. He regularly gives Master Classes in conjunction with his performances internationally.

== Life ==
He studied music at the Cologne University of Music, Germany, with Igor Ozim; at the P.I. Tchaikovsky Conservatory, in Moscow, with Galina Barinova; and at the University of Vienna, Austria, with the famous Czech violinist, Josef Suk; completing his studies with Josef Klima, at the University of Zagreb, Croatia, where he received his post graduate degree.

== Career ==
He has performed in many international music festivals and concert series throughout Europe, and North America and has recorded for radio stations in Slovenia, Italy, Czech Republic, Croatia, Macedonia and in United States. Volodja Balžalorsky has performed notably with the Slovenian Philharmonic Orchestra and with many other orchestras in various countries. He is particularly active in chamber music and has worked with numerous artists and ensembles such as pianists Christoph Theiler, Hinko Haas, Vladislav Kovalsky, the Amael Piano Trio, and Trio Ritratto dell' amore (violin, flute, harpsichord).

=== Concerts ===
In 2017 – 2018 Volodja Balzalorsky brought very successful chamber music performances with Amael Piano trio and recital performances with the pianists Aleksandar Serdar and Peter Caelen in eleven countries. Big success was China Tour in November 2017: Duo Volodja Balzalorsky and Peter Caelen gave concerts in 13 Chinese Million Cities at prestigious Chinese Concert Halls, such as the Beijing Concert Hall, the Concert Hall of the Shandong Grand Theater in Jinan, Hangzhou Grand Theater and others, with a program with only works by Johannes Brahms. In Reviews are mentioned Duo’s superb artistic skills, their perfect chamber music cooperation, and an unforgettable presentation of the magical music world of Brahms, for which the Duo was everywhere rewarded with long-running applause by enthusiastic audience.

=== Live Collection ===
Several CDs and digital albums were released as part of his Live Collection, with five more planned for release on the Cantabel label, supported by the Slovenian Ministry for Culture and the City of Ljubljana, with added releases by Eroica, a well known US label that features great classical artists worldwide. The live Collection of Volodja Balzalorsky, is a unique presentation featuring the violinist with his chamber music partners, from 1985 to the present. The performances are taken from live national broadcasts, international festivals and concert series, around the world.

== Reception ==
Critic Slobodan Turlakov spoke of Balžalorsky's musicianship after a 1988 performance; ”Volodja Balzalorsky is passionately devoted to violin, inspired by the flame which distinguishes the most refined and authentic violinists capable of building the dramaturgy of musical works in the most natural and persuasive manner. His interpretation calls for an exalted and compassionate listener, which is the distinction of rare and predestined musicians...”

=== Awards ===
He is the winner of the Hollywood Music in Media Award, the Inland Empire Music Award 2008 - Best International Artist, the Ontario Independent Music Award - Best International Artist and a nominee of the Los Angeles Music Awards - Best Classical Artist in 2007/2008. He is also the winner of the 2006 Betetto Music Award, the highest music award given in Slovenia.
