= Score (2Cellos album) =

Studio album by 2Cellos
- Released: 21 March 2017
- Studio: Air Studios/Angel Recording Studios
- Length: 61:03
- Label: Portrait/Sony Masterworks
- Producer: Luka Sulic, Stjepan Hauser, Nick Patrick

2Cellos chronology
Celloverse (2015)	Score (2017)	Let There Be Cello (2018)

Score is a 2017 album by Croatian duo 2Cellos, produced by them, in conjunction with Nick Patrick. It features songs from movies and TV shows, such as Schindler's List and Game of Thrones. The album was preceded by the single "Game of Thrones".

The duo were backed on the album by the London Symphony Orchestra with Robin Smith acting as arranger and conductor.

The album was promoted by a performance at the London Palladium on 22 March, with a world tour to start in July 2017.

== Track listing ==
All tracks arranged by Luka Sulic and Stjepan Hauser.

No.	Title	Writer(s)	Length
1.	"Medley – Game of Thrones"	Ramin Djawadi, George R.R. Martin	5:03
2.	"May It Be"	Howard Shore, Enya, Roma Ryan, Nicky Ryan	3:56
3.	"For the Love of a Princess"	James Horner	5:11
4.	"Love Story"	Francis Lai, Carl Sigman	3:24
5.	"Cinema Paradiso"	Ennio Morricone, Andrea Morricone	3:59
6.	"Moon River"	Henry Mancini, Johnny Mercer	3:13
7.	"Love Theme – The Godfather"	Nino Rota	3:54
8.	"My Heart Will Go On"	James Horner, Will Jennings	5:44
9.	"Theme – Rain Man"	Hans Zimmer	4:41
10.	"Cavatina"	Stanley Myers	3:43
11.	"Malena"	Ennio Morricone	4:10
12.	"Main Theme – Schindler's List"	John Williams	4:22
13.	"Titles – Chariots of Fire"	Vangelis	3:40
14.	"Now We Are Free"	Hans Zimmer, Lisa Gerrard, Klaus Badelt	6:03

== Charts ==
Chart (2017–18)	Peak position
Australian Albums (ARIA)	35
Austrian Albums (Ö3 Austria)	62
Belgian Albums (Ultratop Flanders)	43
Belgian Albums (Ultratop Wallonia)	127
Czech Albums (ČNS IFPI)	35
Italian Albums (FIMI)	25
New Zealand Heatseekers Albums (RMNZ)	4
Polish Albums (ZPAV)	33
Swiss Albums (Schweizer Hitparade)	63
US Billboard 200	119
