= Michael Lee Firkins (album) =

Studio album by Michael Lee Firkins
- Released: 1990
- Recorded: November 1989
- Studio: Prairie Sun Recording Studios in Cotati, California
- Genre: Instrumental rock, blues rock
- Length: 40:22
- Label: Shrapnel
- Producer: Mike Varney, Steve Fontano

Michael Lee Firkins chronology
Michael Lee Firkins (1990)	Chapter Eleven (1995)

Michael Lee Firkins is the self-titled first studio album by guitarist Michael Lee Firkins, released in 1990 through Shrapnel Records.

In a 2009 article by Guitar World magazine, the album was ranked eighth on the all-time top ten list of shred albums.

== Critical reception ==
Professional ratings
Review scores
Source	Rating
AllMusic	4/5 stars
Rock Hard	5.0/10

Vincent Jeffries at AllMusic reviewed the album very positively, praising Firkins' unique playing and guitar tone and suggesting that he was "one of the best artists (if not the best)" from Shrapnel's 1980s–early 90s shred line-up. He also highlighted "Déjà Blues", "Space Crickets" and "Laughing Stacks" as "instrumental classics".

== Track listing ==
All music is composed by Michael Lee Firkins

No.	Title	Length
1.	"Laughing Stacks"	4:21
2.	"24 Grand Avenue"	4:36
3.	"Runaway Train"	3:08
4.	"Cactus Cruz"	3:28
5.	"Déjà Blues"	6:27
6.	"Space Crickets"	3:44
7.	"Rain in the Tunnel"	5:23
8.	"Hula Hoops"	3:50
9.	"The Sargasso Sea"	5:25
Total length:		40:22

== Personnel ==
Musicians

- Michael Lee Firkins – guitar
- Jeff Pilson – bass (except track 9)
- Mark "Mooka" Rennick – bass (track 9), mixing assistance
- James Kottak – drums

Production

- Mike Varney – producer
- Steve Fontano – producer, engineer, mixing
- Joe Marquez, Marc Reyburn, Shawn Micheal Morris – assistant engineers
- Stuart Hirotsu – mixing assistance
- George Horn – mastering at Fantasy Studios, Berkeley, California
