= Yoko Misumi =

Japanese pianist

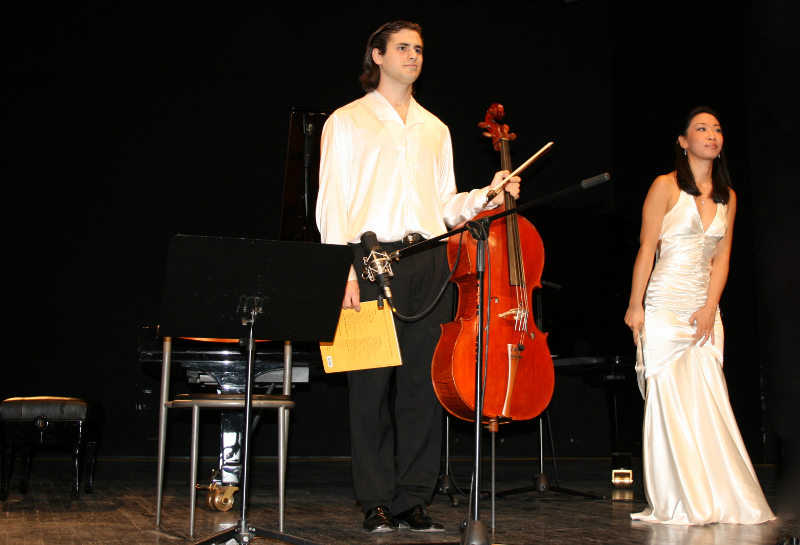
Yoko Misumi with cellist Stjepan Hauser

Yoko Misumi (三角ようこ, Misumi Yōko) is a Japanese classical pianist.

Misumi was born in Kyoto, Japan to a musical family and started piano lessons from a very early age. At age 14, she received the Second Prize in the prestigious Kyoto Piano Competition. After graduating from Kyoto Music High School she moved to London, where she completed a BMus degree at Trinity College of Music, and later two postgraduate diplomas.

Misumi's concert appearances include a highly acclaimed performance of Chopin's "Andante spianato and Grande Polonaise brillante" with the Trinity College of Music Symphony Orchestra under James Judd. Yoko has performed all around Japan and in Germany, Portugal, London, Italy, Croatia and Slovenia, both as soloist and in chamber music recitals. She has appeared in such prestigious venues as Kyoto Concert Hall, St. Martin-in-the-Fields, St James's Church Piccadilly, Wigmore Hall, Adrian Boult Hall and Regent Hall. In master classes Yoko has worked with Bernard Greenhouse and Dimitri Alexeev, among others.

She is the recipient of the First Prize of the John Longmire Beethoven Competition, Second Prize in the Beethoven Piano Society of Europe Intercollegiate Piano Competition 2005, the winner of the Elizabeth Schumann Lieder competition 2006 and the Leonard Smith & Felicity Young Duo Competition 2007 with cellist Stjepan Hauser. Most recently she won the 2008 Alfred Kitchin Piano Competition. Currently, Yoko is the Leverhulme Scholar at Trinity College of Music, and also recipient of the TCM Founders' Prize for musical accomplishments.

Misumi is a member of The Greenwich Trio, together with the Slovenian violinist Lana Trotovsek and Croatian cellist Stjepan Hauser. The Trio, a 2008 winner of Solti Foundation Award, has been described by legendary cellist Bernard Greenhouse as the new "Beaux Arts Trio". The trio won both the first and the audience prize of the Cavatina Chamber Music Competition, a result that was followed by a series of highly praised concerts all around Europe. They are the current holders of the first prize in the Trinity Laban Chamber Music Competition and of the first and special prizes at the International Chamber Music Competition in Candelo, Italy.

The Greenwich Trio received regular coaching from Bernard Greenhouse (Beaux Arts Trio) and Stephen Kovacevich, and has received coaching from Rivka Golani, and master classes from Bernard Greenhouse, Ivry Gitlis and Klaus Maetzl (Alban Berg Quartet). Highlights from the year 2008 include concert in St. Martin in the Fields and performance of the Triple Concerto with conductor Barry Wordsworth.
