= Michael Lee Firkins =

- Born: May 19, 1967 (age 59); Omaha, Nebraska, U.S.
- Genres: Hard rock, country rock, blues rock, jazz rock, rock
- Occupation: Musician
- Instrument: Electric guitar
- Years active: 1985–present
- Labels: Shrapnel, Nuerra Records, Magna Carta
- Website: www.michaelleefirkins.com

Michael Lee Firkins (born May 19, 1967) is an American electric guitar player whose music fuses bluegrass, country, blues, and jazz elements into a distorted rock sound. He is noted amongst guitarists for his prolific use of hybrid picking at high speeds.

== Early life ==
Firkins was born in 1967 in Omaha, Nebraska, to musician parents; his father was a lap steel guitarist and his mother a pianist. He started playing acoustic guitar at the age of eight. Though mostly self-taught, he also took lessons at a local Omaha music store. Learning the songs of the time, Firkins was influenced by the guitar styles of Lynyrd Skynyrd, Led Zeppelin, AC/DC, and Black Sabbath.

== Career ==
By 1979, Firkins had a Gibson SG and a Fender Princeton Reverb. Now wielding an electrified tone, he played in local bands and in church from the age of 12 until 18. In 1985, Firkins started touring the country in cover bands. He eventually went back to Omaha and began teaching guitar.

Firkins recorded a five-song demo of instrumental guitar tunes at Rainbow Recording Studios in Omaha, Nebraska. The demo was sent to Shrapnel Records, resulting in a record contract and subsequent release of his first album.

In 1990, Firkins released his self-titled debut album. This release highlighted Firkins's encyclopedic knowledge of bluegrass and country licks. With the help of an international advertising campaign from Yamaha guitars to promote the company's Pacifica models, Firkins's first release sold more than 100,000 copies. The album also landed him the top spot in the category of "Best New Talent" in a readers' poll in Guitar Player magazine that year. He was also hailed as "One of the Most Influential Players of the Next Ten Years" by Guitar for the Practicing Musician. Firkins's music was also popular in Europe, as Firkins won the Edison Award, which is the equivalent of a Grammy, in the Netherlands.

Firkins went on to release three more records for the Shrapnel label. His sound went on to incorporate more music styles, specifically jazz, as shown in a cover of Duke Ellington's "The Mooche" on Firkins' third album, Chapter Eleven. Cactus Cruz was his last recording for Shrapnel in 1996.

In 1997, Firkins recorded Decomposition for Nuerra Records. The album was composed of covers, with Firkins paying tribute to some of his earlier influences, such as Lynyrd Skynyrd, Johnny Winter, and Jimi Hendrix.

In the early 2000s, he teamed up with fellow guitarist Gabriel Moses for a side project titled Dose Amigos, which has been most frequently compared to Tenacious D. Both guitarists incorporated elements of bluegrass and heavy metal at extremely high speeds, with humorous themes. The project showcased Firkins and Moses's original technique of emulating a slide guitar with the use of the tremolo arm.

== Discography ==
=== Albums ===
- 1990: Michael Lee Firkins
- 1994: Howling Iguanas
- 1995: Chapter Eleven
- 1996: Cactus Crüz
- 1999: Decomposition
- 2007: Black Light Sonatas
- 2013: Yep

=== Instructional ===
- 2009: Mastering Lead Guitar, Michael Lee Firkins, Hot Licks Productions, Inc.

=== Guest appearances ===
- 1992: Blues Tracks, Pat Travers, RoadRunner
- 1994: Cream of the Crop, A Tribute, RoadRunner
- 1996: Perspective, Jason Becker
- 1997: Best of the Blues Plus Live, Pat Travers, Blues Bureau Int'l
- 1997: Guitar Battle, Victor Records
- 1997: The Jimi Hendrix Music Festival, Provogue
- 2001: Staring at the Sun, Neil Zaza, Melodik Records
- 2004: Take You Higher, Clinton Administration, Magna Carta
- 2008: Collection, Jason Becker, Shrapnel
- 2009: This is Shredding, Vol. 1, Shrapnel
- 2013: The Manhattan Blues Project, Steve Hunter, Deacon Records
- 2018: Triumphant Hearts, Jason Becker, Music Theories / Mascot Label Records
