= Greenwich Trio =

Classical piano trio

The Greenwich Trio is a classical piano trio formed in 2006. Its members are Lana Trotovšek (violin), Heather Tuach (cello), and Yoko Misumi (piano).

The Greenwich Trio, described by cellist Bernard Greenhouse as the "New Beaux Arts Trio", was originally formed by pianist Yoko Misumi, Beethoven Society of Europe top prize-winner; Lana Trotovsek, a talent unveiled by Ruggiero Ricci’s at Salzburg's Mozarteum concert hall; and cellist Stjepan Hauser, last student of Mstislav Rostropovich and winner of 21 first prizes all over the world.

The trio won series of first prizes in the international chamber music competitions in UK, Belgium and Italy.

The Greenwich Trio received regular coaching from Bernard Greenhouse and Stephen Kovacevich, and has also received coaching from Beaux Arts Trio, Ivry Gitlis, Alban Berg Quartet, Wihan Quartet, The Schubert Ensemble, Israel Piano Trio, and Rivka Golani. During their time together, they performed in some of the most prestigious European international music festivals and released numerous recordings.
