= Leslie Craven =

British clarinettist

- Occupation: Principal Clarinet W.N.O.
- Instrument: Clarinet
- Website: http://www.lesliecraven.co.uk

Leslie Craven is a British clarinettist. Until 2018, he was Principal Clarinettist in the orchestra of the Welsh National Opera. He teaches at the Royal Welsh College of Music and Drama. He is co-founder of the Clarinet Convention hosted by the University of Cardiff College of Music. He has given master classes in many establishments including the Royal College of Music, Trinity College of Music, Birmingham Conservatoire, the Clarinet Summer School (Hope University Liverpool) and as far afield as Cape Town (School of Music, Cape Town University) and Hong Kong (Academy of Performing Arts). He has played principal clarinet on recordings and for many performances with the Royal Philharmonic Orchestra, the Philharmonia, the London Symphony Orchestra, London Musici and the BBC Concert Orchestra. His discography includes the CDs Expressions, Romantic Trios with 2CELLOS star Stjepan Hauser and Yoko Misumi, and Rota Centenary with Michael Pollock, Yoko Misumi and Stjepan Hauser. Other discs include Clarissima (to be recorded April 2014 the music of Roma Cafolla) with virtuoso friends Lana Trotovsek and Yoko Misumi, Katharine Thomas (harp), Boris Bizjak (flute) and Patrick King (bodhran). He has recorded much of the music of Christopher Ball written for and dedicated to him, including his Concerto for clarinet and chamber works including "Celtic Twilight" and "Quintet" (2013) for clarinet and string quartet. With flautist Anna Noakes he has recorded "Sonatine" by Andre Jolivet and "Choros no2" by Villa Llobos.

Commercial work includes film soundtracks for the original Wicker Man, Howards End, The Pope Must Die, Mickey Blue Eyes, Pirate Prince and many TV series including House of Elliot, Soldier Soldier, Anna Lee and many others.

He is one of Great Britain's most sought after teachers and has written a pedagogical self-help book for clarinet titled Instant Help for Playing and Teaching the Clarinet. Craven's personal design mouthpiece is made by Bradford Behn in the United States and is played by many leading players in the profession in U.K. and overseas.
