= Chapter Eleven (album) =

Studio album by Michael Lee Firkins
- Released: November 7, 1995
- Studios: Hot Box, Novato, California; Studio D, San Francisco
- Genres: Instrumental rock, blues rock
- Length: 41:15
- Label: Shrapnel
- Producer: Michael Lee Firkins

Michael Lee Firkins chronology
Michael Lee Firkins (1990)	Chapter Eleven (1995)	Cactus Cruz (1996)

Chapter Eleven is the second studio album by guitarist Michael Lee Firkins, released on November 7, 1995 through Shrapnel Records.

== Track listing ==
All tracks are written by Michael Lee Firkins, except where noted.

No.	Title	Length
1.	"Big Red"	4:15
2.	"(Media Showers)"	1:19
3.	"Hypno-5"	4:55
4.	"Trinity Road"	5:12
5.	"Car-less Sonata"	5:01
6.	"B.H. Express"	3:40
7.	"Rio Hide-a-Way"	4:17
8.	"Baci Boy Blues"	4:47
9.	"The Mooche" (Duke Ellington)	3:33
10.	"Hawaiian Gospel"	4:16
Total length:		41:15

== Personnel ==
- Michael Lee Firkins – guitar, engineering, mixing, production
- Mike van der Hule – drums
- Dennis Murphy – bass (except tracks 6, 8, 10)
- Terry Miller – bass (tracks 6, 8, 10)
- Wally Buck – engineering
- Greg Forsberg – mixing
- Chris Collins – mixing
- Eddy Schreyer – mastering
