= 2Cellos (album) =

Studio album by 2Cellos
- Released: 10 June 2011
- Recorded: May 2011
- Studios: Morris Studio, Zagreb
- Genres: Cello rock; classical crossover
- Length: 53:15
- Label: Sony Masterworks
- Producer: Miroslav Vidović

2Cellos chronology
2Cellos (2011)	In2ition (2012)

Singles from 2Cellos
- 1. "Smooth Criminal"; 2. "Welcome to the Jungle"; 3. "Hurt"

2Cellos is the debut studio album by Croatian cello duo 2Cellos. It was released on 10 June 2011, worldwide, through Sony Masterworks. The album peaked at number 1 on the US Billboard Top Classical Albums chart.

== Critical reception ==
Chad Grischow of IGN Music called the duo's Nirvana cover "astonishing" and the U2 covers "nothing short of magical." However, he was unimpressed by "The Resistance," and wrote that "'Viva La Vida' is too obvious a choice" for their debut album.

Ultimate Guitar commented on the album's choice of songs as "eclectic ... but the cellists handle a good number of genres easily." The site attributed the album's quality to the fact that the "duo's approach to the majority of the songs is more about texture or a percussive quality ... against flashy, over-the-top tracks."

AllMusic's review noted that the cellists "have created an inventive first offering, with unique and innovative arrangements, that deserves to transcend their YouTube beginnings" and praises their musical talents "which seem to produce sounds from a cello that otherwise wouldn't seem possible."

== Track listing ==
No.	Title	Writer(s)	Arranger(s)	Length
1.	"Where the Streets Have No Name"	U2	Šulić, Hauser	4:02
2.	"Misirlou (theme from Pulp Fiction)"	Dick Dale	Šulić, Hauser	2:13
3.	"Use Somebody"	Kings of Leon	Šulić, Hauser	3:27
4.	"Smooth Criminal"	Michael Jackson	Šulić, Hauser	4:05
5.	"Fragile"	Sting	Šulić, Hauser	3:26
6.	"The Resistance"	Muse	Šulić, Hauser	3:49
7.	"Hurt"	Nine Inch Nails	Šulić, Hauser	4:29
8.	"Welcome to the Jungle"	Guns N' Roses	Šulić, Hauser	3:08
9.	"Human Nature"	Porcaro, Bettis	Šulić, Hauser	2:47
10.	"Viva La Vida"	Coldplay	Šulić, Hauser	3:41
11.	"Smells Like Teen Spirit"	Nirvana	Šulić, Hauser	2:50
12.	"With or Without You"	U2	Šulić, Hauser	4:51

iTunes bonus track
No.	Title	Writer(s)	Arranger(s)	Length
13.	"Fields of Gold"	Sting	Šulić, Hauser	2:54

Japanese deluxe edition
No.	Title	Writer(s)	Arranger(s)	Length
13.	"Fields of Gold"	Sting	Šulić, Hauser	2:54
14.	"Welcome to the Jungle" (Live in Tokyo)	Guns N' Roses	Šulić, Hauser
15.	"Human Nature" (Live in Tokyo)	Steve Porcaro, John Bettis	Šulić, Hauser
16.	"Smooth Criminal" (Live in Tokyo)	Michael Jackson	Šulić, Hauser

== Charts ==
=== Album ===
Year	Chart	Peak position	Ref.
2011	Belgium Albums Top 50	30	
2011	Croatian Albums Chart	1	
2011	Mexico Albums Top 100	46	
2011	US Billboard 200	85	
2011	US Digital Albums	24	
2011	US Billboard Classical Albums	1	
2013	Japanese Albums Chart	13	
2013	Swiss Albums Top 100	99	
2015	Hungarian Albums Chart	11	

=== Singles ===
Title	Peak position				
Title	AUS	CAN	IRL	UK	US
"Smooth Criminal" (featuring Glee)	59	28	46	86	26

=== Year-end charts ===
Chart (2011)	Position	Ref.
Croatian Albums Chart	2	
US Top Classical Albums	12	

== Music videos ==
List of music videos, showing year released and director
Title	Year	Director(s)	Notes
"Smooth Criminal"	2011	Kristijan Burlović	Filmed in Pula, Croatia.
"Welcome to the Jungle"	2011	Kristijan Burlović	Filmed in Pula, Croatia.
"Hurt"	2012	Kristijan Burlović	Filmed in Rakalj, Croatia.

== Release history ==
Regions	Dates	Format(s)	Label(s)	Edition(s)
Worldwide	10 June 2011	Digital download	Sony	Standard
Worldwide	19 July 2011	CD	Sony	Standard
Japan	25 April 2012	CD	Sony Japan	Deluxe

== Accolades ==
Year	Award	Category	Recipient	Result	Ref.
2012	Porin	Best International Album	2Cellos	Won	
2012	Porin	Best International Song	"Smooth Criminal"	Won	
