= In2ition =

Studio album by 2Cellos
- Released: 9 November 2012
- Recorded: 2012
- Genres: Rock; cello rock; classical crossover
- Length: 48:01
- Label: Sony Masterworks
- Producer: Bob Ezrin

2Cellos chronology
2Cellos (2011)	In2ition (2012)	Live at Arena Zagreb (2013)

Singles from In2ition
- 1. "Highway to Hell (feat. Steve Vai)"; 2. "Supermassive Black Hole (feat. Naya Rivera)"; 3. "Il Libro Dell 'Amore (feat. Zucchero)"; 4. "Technical Difficulties"

In2ition is the second studio album by Croatian cello duo, 2Cellos. It was released on 9 November 2012, in Japan, and 15 January 2013, in the rest of the world, through Sony Masterworks. The album peaked at number 1 on the Croatian and Japanese Albums charts.

== Track listing ==
All music is composed by Luka Šulić and Stjepan Hauser.

No.	Title	Writer(s)	Length
1.	"Oh Well" (feat. Elton John)	Peter Green	2:35
2.	"We Found Love"	Calvin Harris	3:34
3.	"Highway to Hell" (feat. Steve Vai)	Angus Young; Malcolm Young; Bon Scott	3:31
4.	"Every Breath You Take"	Sting	3:51
5.	"Supermassive Black Hole" (feat. Naya Rivera)	Matt Bellamy	3:26
6.	"Technical Difficulties"	Racer X	2:46
7.	"Clocks" (feat. Lang Lang)	Guy Berryman; Jonny Buckland; Will Champion; Chris Martin	5:39
8.	"Bang Bang" (feat. Sky Ferreira)	Sonny Bono	2:47
9.	"Voodoo People"	Liam Howlett	2:47
10.	"Candle in the Wind"	Elton John; Bernie Taupin	2:48
11.	"Orient Express"	Šulić; Hauser	3:10
12.	"Il Libro Dell'Amore (Note: "The Book of Love", a song by The Magnetic Fields, translated into Italian.)" (feat. Zucchero)	The Magnetic Fields; Peter Gabriel	3:27
13.	"Benedictus"	Karl Jenkins	6:40
Total length:			48:01

All music is composed by Luka Šulić and Stjepan Hauser.

iTunes bonus track
No.	Title	Writer(s)	Length
14.	"Californication"	Red Hot Chili Peppers	3:48

All music is composed by Luka Šulić and Stjepan Hauser.

Japanese Collector's Edition
No.	Title	Writer(s)	Length
14.	"Californication"	Red Hot Chili Peppers	3:48
15.	"Every Breath You Take" (feat. Steve Hunter)	Sting	3:51
16.	"Smooth Criminal" (feat. Glee Cast)	Michael Jackson	2:02
17.	"Every Teardrop Is a Waterfall"	Coldplay	2:44
18.	"Purple Haze"	Jimi Hendrix	2:29
19.	"Good Riddance (Time of Your Life)"	Billie Joe Armstrong	2:34
20.	"The Book of Love"	The Magnetic Fields; Peter Gabriel	3:27
21.	"Kagemusha"		2:58

== Personnel ==
Credits taken from the liner notes.

2Cellos

- Stjepan Hauser and Luka Šulić – cellos

Additional musicians

- Dušan Kranjc – drums on "Highway To Hell"
- Tom Snider – keyboards on "Benedictus"
- Bob Ezrin – keyboards on "Benedictus"

== Charts ==
=== Weekly charts ===
Year	Chart	Peak position	Ref.
2013	Croatian Albums Chart	1	
2013	Japanese Albums Chart	1	
2013	Swiss Albums Top 100	81	
2013	US The Billboard 200	174	
2013	US Classical Albums (Billboard)	4	
2015	Hungarian Albums Chart	17	

=== Year-end charts ===
Year	Chart	Peak position	Ref.
2013	Croatian International Albums	1	
2013	US Classical Albums (Billboard)	38	

== Music videos ==
List of music videos, showing year released and director
Title	Year	Director(s)	Notes
"Highway to Hell"	2012	—N/a	Featuring Steve Vai. The video was filmed at Guitar Centre, in East Brunswick, New Jersey.
"Supermassive Black Hole"	2012	—N/a	Featuring Naya Rivera.
"Il Libro Dell 'Amore"	2013	Tvrtko Karačić	Featuring Zucchero. Animated music video.
"Technical Difficulties"	2013	Domen Smrdel	Filmed at the home of the Flying Bulls, Salzburg's Hangar-7, by Baza Media for Red Bull Media House. During the video shoot, 2Cellos were accompanied by aerobatics pilot duo, Rainer Wilke and Mirko Flaim.

== Release history ==
Regions	Dates	Format(s)	Label(s)	Edition(s)
Japan	9 November 2012	CD; digital download	Sony Japan	Standard, deluxe
Croatia	22 December 2012	CD; digital download	Menart	Standard
Worldwide	15 January 2013	CD; digital download	Sony	Standard
Japan	21 August 2013	CD; digital download	Sony Japan	Special edition

== Accolades ==
Year	Award	Category	Recipient	Result	Ref.
2013	Porin	Best International Album	In2ition	Nominated	
2014	Japan Gold Disc Award	Instrumental Album of the Year	In2ition	Won	
