= Stjepan Hauser =

Croatian cellist (born 1986)

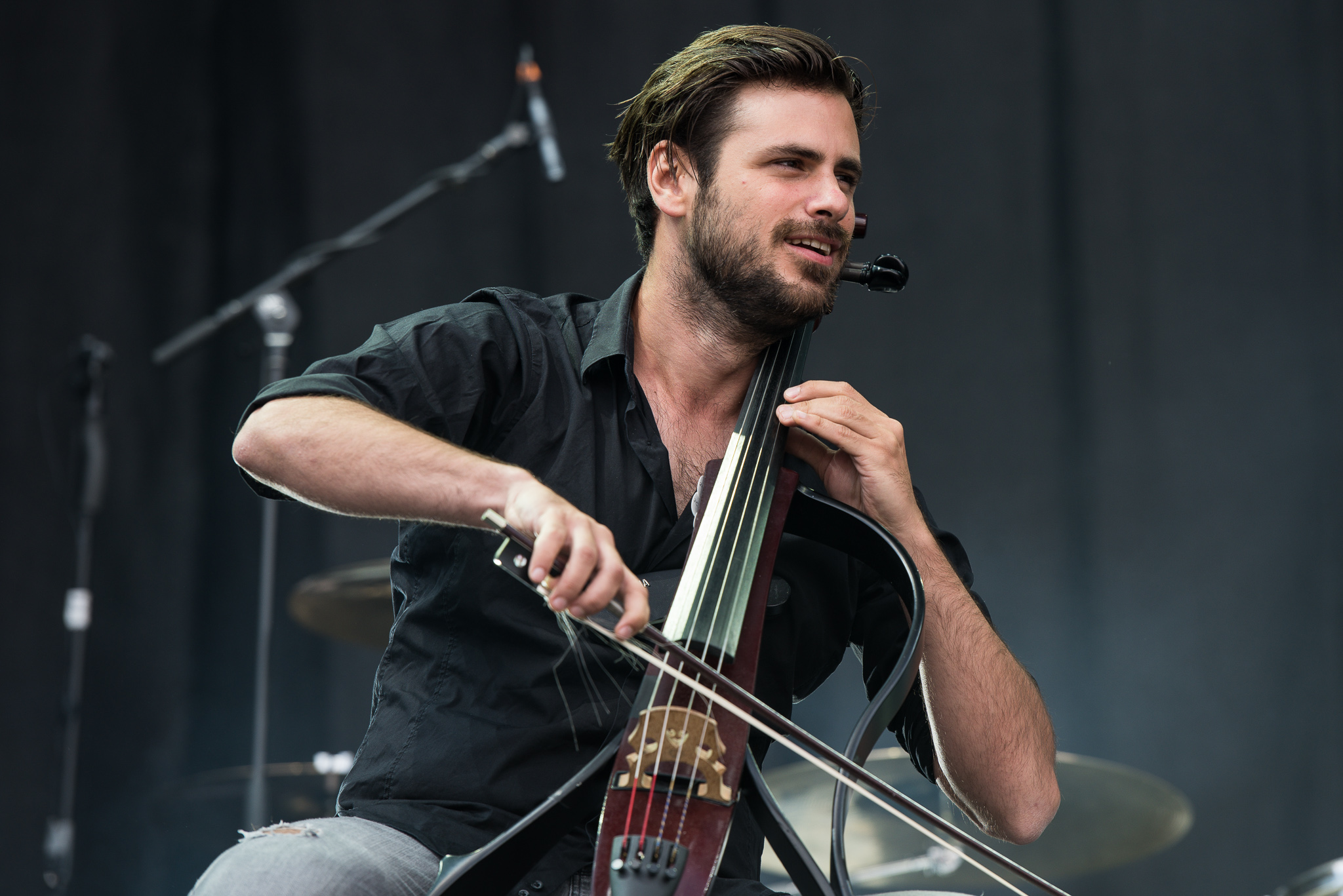
- Hauser in 2017

Background information
- Born: 15 June 1986 (age 39); Pula, SR Croatia, SFR Yugoslavia
- Genres: Classical; Classical rock; Classical crossover
- Instruments: Cello
- Formerly of: 2Cellos
- Website: www.hauserofficial.com

Stjepan Hauser (Croatian pronunciation: [stjêpaːn xǎuser]; born 15 June 1986), known professionally as HAUSER, is a Croatian cellist. He was a member of 2CELLOS, along with his friend Luka Šulić, and continues to perform solo.

== Early life and musical training ==
Hauser was born in Pula, Croatia, into a musical family, where he began his musical education. His mother plays percussion. His sister is a journalist in Pula.

Hauser finished secondary school in Rijeka. He studied in Zagreb but moved to the United Kingdom where he studied under Natalia Pavlutskaya at Trinity College of Music (now Trinity Laban) London and completed his postgraduate studies with Ralph Kirshbaum as a Dorothy Stone Scholar at Royal Northern College of Music in Manchester. He also studied with Bernard Greenhouse in the USA.

== Career ==
Hauser has performed in more than 40 countries including debuts in Wigmore Hall, Royal Albert Hall, Amsterdam Concertgebouw, Southbank Centre and many more.

In October 2006, Hauser was chosen to perform at the gala at Palazzo Vecchio in Florence for Mstislav Rostropovich. Following this appearance, Hauser was invited to perform in numerous festivals in Europe. At the International Holland Music Sessions 2009, he was chosen to participate in the "New Masters on Tour" concert series, presenting young artists in prestigious concert venues all over the continent.

In December 2007, Hauser played the Kol Nidre with the Metropolitan Sinfonia at a Gala Tribute Concert dedicated to Mstislav Rostropovich. Subsequently, Hauser went on to perform and record as a solo artist including his recording of British composer Christopher Ball's First Concerto for Cello, written by the composer specifically for him. The album, Christopher Ball: Music for Cello, was recorded at the first live performance of the concerto in 2010, and features former Greenwich Trio member, Yoko Misumi, on piano.

On 11 June 2009, Hauser launched his channel on YouTube, which had since reached over 970 million views by June 2024. In January 2011, Hauser, along with friend and fellow cellist Luka Šulić, performed a cover of Michael Jackson's "Smooth Criminal" which was played solely on cello. In just a few days, the music video became a YouTube sensation.

The album Hauser Classic was released on 7 February 2020, in which he plays alongside the London Symphony Orchestra. The album was produced by Nick Patrick.

During the COVID-19 quarantine, unable to tour in support of his solo album, Hauser released three performances via live streaming. The first, Hauser: Alone Together, released on 27 April 2020 was performed at the Arena Pula, in Stjepan's hometown of Pula, Croatia, on the Istrian peninsula. The second, also titled Hauser: Alone Together, was performed at Krka National Park, at the Krka Waterfalls in central Croatia. The second video was released on 15 June 2020, to celebrate the artist's 34th birthday. The third, again titled Hauser: Alone Together, was recorded at Fort Lovrijenac in Dubrovnik, Croatia, recognisable to many fans from the HBO series, Game of Thrones. A special 2 disc edition of Hauser Classic is scheduled for October 2020 release. It includes a DVD of the three Hauser: Alone Together videos.

The album Hauser plays Morricone premiered on YouTube on 27 October 2020.

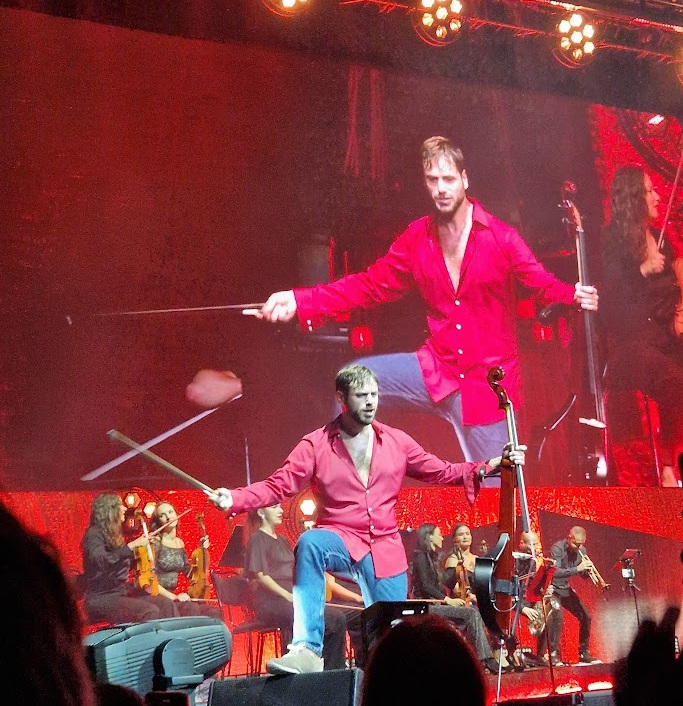
Hauser performing in London in November 2023 during his Rebel with a Cello Tour

In September 2022, Hauser announced his first solo world tour, titled Rebel with a Cello, following the conclusion of 2Cellos' final tour. The tour featured performances combining classical crossover repertoire with contemporary arrangements from his solo album The Player.

In 2023, Hauser released his first holiday album, Christmas, featuring orchestral and choral arrangements of traditional Christmas music.

Between 2024 and 2025, Hauser embarked on his second major solo concert tour, The Rebel Is Back, which included performances across Europe and featured guest appearances by violinist Caroline Campbell and soprano Amy Manford.

In 2026, Hauser announced the cancellation of scheduled tour dates due to health issues requiring rest and recovery. In his post, he presented a photo of himself wearing a neck brace (soft collar).

== Collaborations ==
Hauser has worked with cellists such as Mstislav Rostropovich, Bernard Greenhouse, Heinrich Schiff, Frans Helmerson, Arto Noras, Il Volo, Ralph Kirshbaum, Valter Despalj, Philippe Muller, Thomas Demenga, Young-Chang Cho, Reinhard Latzko, Karine Georgian, Roel Dieltiens, and Alexander Ivashkin.

In early 2011, Hauser recorded an album with fellow Croatian Damir Urban. The album, the self-titled Urban and Hauser, was released in the summer of 2011. Also in the spring of 2011, he recorded an album with Croatian pop star Oliver Dragojević. The album, Noć nek' tiho svira, was released in October 2011. Also in 2011, they performed together in Pula. That fall, along with fellow 2CELLOS member Luka Šulić, he began touring as a member of the Elton John band. Since then, he has performed with the band hundreds of times, on tour all around the world, and in Las Vegas, Nevada, in the Million Dollar Piano concert performance at the Coliseum at Caesar's Palace. In November 2011, he released another classical album: Brahms, Beethoven & Bruch for Clarinet, Cello & Piano, again with Ms. Misumi, and clarinettist Leslie Craven.

In 2018 and 2019, Hauser released a series of videos with Uzbek-American pianist Lola Astanova on social media.

=== Greenwich Trio ===
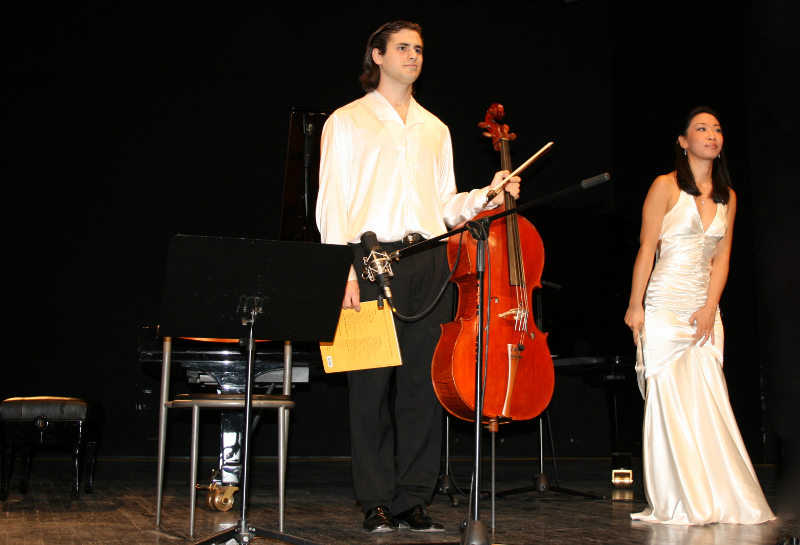
Hauser with Greenwich Trio pianist Yoko Misumi in 2009

Together with the Slovenian violinist Lana Trotovsek and Japanese pianist Yoko Misumi, Hauser was a member of the Greenwich Trio, described by cellist Bernard Greenhouse as the "New Beaux Arts Trio". The Trio won a series of first prizes at international chamber music competitions in the UK, Belgium and Italy. The Greenwich Trio had masterclasses with Amadeus Quartet, Alban Berg Quartet, Guarneri Quartet, Beaux Arts Trio, Trio Fontenay, Menahem Pressler, Bernard Greenhouse, Ivry Gitlis, Stephen Kovacevich, Ralf Gothoni, Niklas Schmidt, Arnold Steinhardt, Valentin Erben, and Eberhard Feltz. In March 2008, they performed Beethoven's Triple Concerto with conductor Barry Wordsworth and in September the same year they played in the sold out opening festival at King's Place, London.

=== 2CELLOS ===
Under the name 2CELLOS, Hauser and Šulić recorded an album with Sony Music Entertainment, which was released in July 2011.

In January 2012, they appeared as the special musical guests on Fox's hit TV series Glee where they performed "Smooth Criminal" in the Michael Jackson tribute episode. This was the first time that an instrumental duo had performed on the show in this guest spot. 2CELLOS' arrangement of the song, which featured actors Grant Gustin and Naya Rivera, debuted at #10 on the Billboard Hot 100 Digital Songs Chart and landed their debut album in the Top 100.

In late 2012 and early 2013, a second 2CELLOS album, In2ition, was released.

After the release of the second album, Hauser spent several years touring, either as a member of 2CELLOS or with Elton John. A third album was released in early 2015 called Celloverse, just prior to a 38-city US tour.

From 2014 through 2016, Hauser performed with Oliver Dragojević on at least five occasions, including the 2014 Split Festival, with Luka Šulić appearing briefly to join them, in free concerts in Rakalj and on Korčula, also in 2014, and as a guest at 2CELLOS' 5th anniversary free concert in Tomislav Square in Zagreb in 2016. His final performance in Las Vegas with Elton John was in October 2015.

2CELLOS' fourth album, Score, a collection of movie music, was recorded with the London Symphony Orchestra and released in 2017. The first live performance was held in December 2016, at the Sydney (Australia) Opera House and is available on DVD. 2CELLOS' fifth album, Let There Be Cello, was released in 2018.

After 2CELLOS' 2019 US tour, the duo took a one-year break, to work on solo classical albums for Sony Music and to tour individually.

The 2022 Dedicated World Tour was 2CELLOS' farewell tour.

== Awards and achievements ==
- Ribbon of an Order of Danica Hrvatska with the face of Marko Marulić for a special contribution to the culture and promotion of Croatia in the world.

Hauser is laureate of international competitions and awards such as the PLG Young Artists Auditions 2009, the J & A Beare Solo Bach Competition 2009, NYOS Staffa Award 2009, the Philharmonia Orchestra – Martin Musical Scholarship Fund 2009 and 2008, the Eastbourne Symphony Orchestra Young Soloist Competition 2009 and 2007, the Tunbridge Wells International Young Concert Artists Competition 2008 and 2006, the Computers in Personnel International Concerto Competition 2008, the Frankopan Fund Award 2006, and the MBF Music Education Award 2006 and 2005. He has also won international cello competitions and awards such as the Adam International Cello Festival and Competition in New Zealand 2009, and the VTB Capital Prize for Young Cellists 2009. Altogether, Hauser collected a total of 21 first prizes at national and international competitions and, as a consequence, he was invited to perform twice on Gala concerts for HRH Prince Charles at Buckingham Palace and St. James's Palace.

In May 2012, Hauser won four Porin awards, two with Luka Šulić (2Cellos), and the other two for his collaboration with Damir Urban on their album Urban & Hauser.

Hauser subsequently won an additional Porin award, for Best Video Release, along with Luka Šulić (2CELLOS) and Dušan Kranjc (drummer) for their Arena Zagreb DVD.

== Discography ==
External audio
- You may hear Stjepan Hauser performing: Johann Sebastian Bach's Cantata, BWV 147 ("Jesu, Joy of Man's Desiring"); Tomaso Albinoni's Adagio in G Minor; Wolfgang Amadeus Mozart's Piano Concerto No. 21, K. 467 "Elvira Madigan" - Andante movement No. 2 in 2020 Here on archive.org

As Hauser
Year	Album Title	Label
2010	Song To The Moon	Self Released / Hauser Classics
2011	Urban & Hauser	Aquarius Records
2011	Christopher Ball: Music for Cello	Musical Concepts
2011	Nino Rota Centenary Album	Musical Concepts
2011	Brahms, Beethoven & Bruch for Clarinet, Cello & Piano	Musical Concepts
2012	Noć Nek' Tiho Svira	Aquarius Records
2020	Classic (with the London Symphony Orchestra)	Sony Masterworks
2020	Plays Morricone (with the Prague Symphony Orchestra)	Sony Masterworks
2022	The Player	Sony Masterworks
2025	Cinema (with the London Symphony Orchestra)	Sony Masterworks

As 2CELLOS
Year	Album Title	Label
2011	2Cellos	Sony Masterworks
2013	In2ition	Sony Masterworks
2015	Celloverse	Sony Masterworks
2017	Score (with the London Symphony Orchestra)	Sony Masterworks
2018	Let There Be Cello	Sony Masterworks
2021	Dedicated	Sony Masterworks
