= 2Cellos =

Croatian musical duo

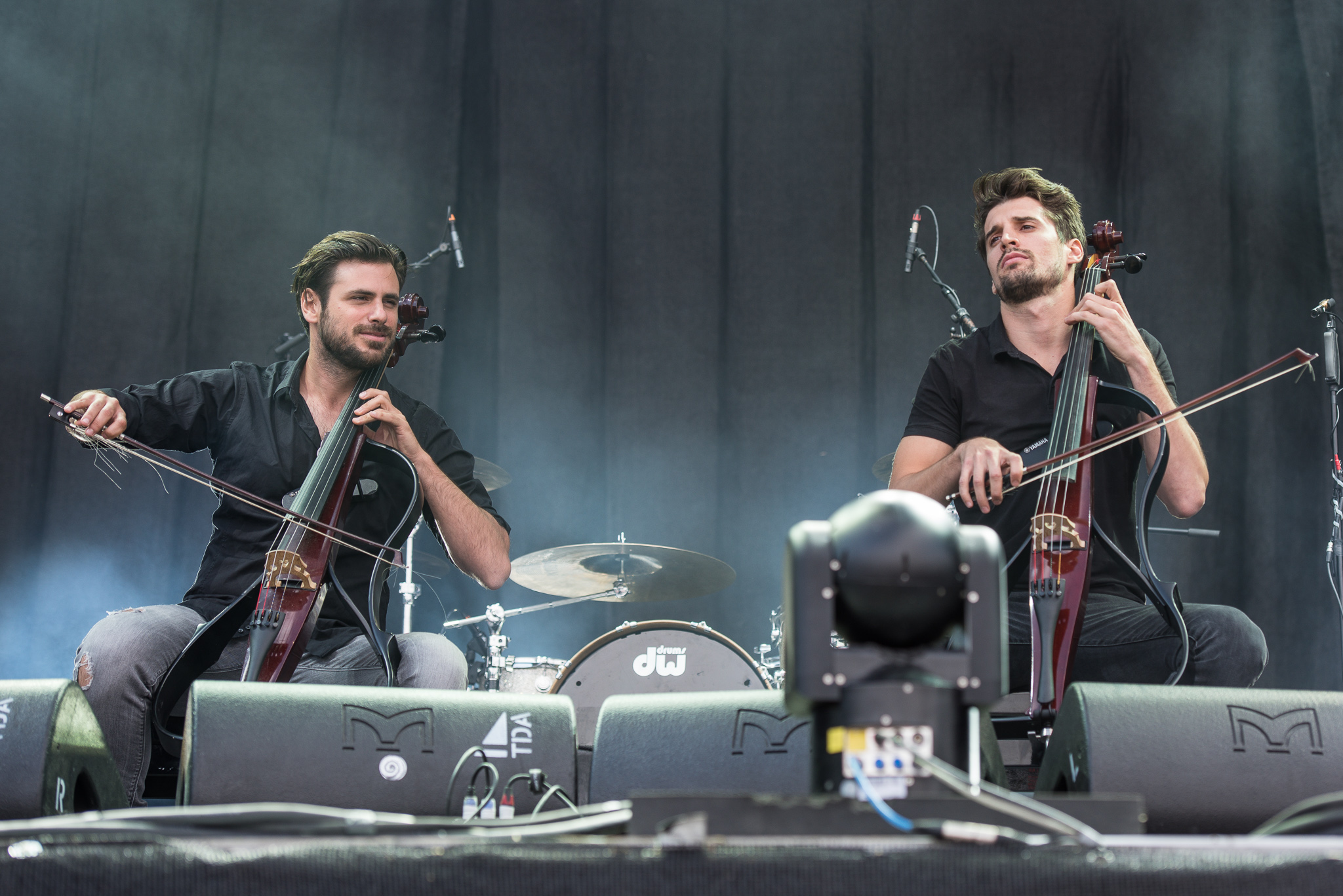
- 2Cellos in 2017

Background information
- Origin: Zagreb, Croatia
- Genres: Cello rock, classical, chamber music, instrumental rock
- Years active: 2011-2022
- Label: Sony Masterworks
- Past members: Luka Šulić; Stjepan Hauser; Dušan Kranjc
- Website: "2Cellos.com". Archived from the original on 3 October 2023.

YouTube information
- Channel: 2Cellos
- Subscribers: 6.2+ million
- Views: 1.6+ billion
- Last updated: 18 September 2022

2Cellos (stylized 2CΞLLOS) were a Croatian cellist duo, consisting of classically trained cellists Luka Šulić and Stjepan Hauser. Signed to Sony Masterworks in 2011, they released six albums. The duo played instrumental arrangements for cellos of well-known pop and rock songs, as well as classical and film music. The duo performed internationally and were featured on several American television series including Glee and The Bachelor (Sean and Catherine's Wedding). They continue to be active as solo performers.

== Background ==
Hauser is from Pula, Croatia, and Šulić is from Maribor, Slovenia (born to a Croatian father and Slovenian mother). They met at a master class in Pula while still in their teens. They were both educated at the Academy of Music in Zagreb. Later on, Šulić studied in Vienna and they both studied in the UK (Šulić at London's Royal Academy of Music and Hauser at Trinity College of Music, now Trinity Laban Conservatoire of Music in London and then at the Royal Northern College of Music in Manchester).

The duo rose to fame in 2011 after their cover of "Smooth Criminal" became a hit on YouTube, receiving over three million views in the first two weeks and almost 43 million views as of April 2021. One of Hauser's acquaintances in Croatia, a director, assisted in the creation of a video to "Smooth Criminal." The video features Šulić and Hauser facing off alone in a large ballroom littered with chairs, playing Jackson's tune. Before they became partners, the two cellists were sometimes considered rivals, competing against each other in music competitions.

== Career ==
2Cellos signed to record with Sony Masterworks, and finished recording their first album in May 2011, which carried the Menart Records label in Croatia. Released on 19 July 2011, their eponymous debut album includes covers of songs by U2, Guns N' Roses, Nine Inch Nails, Sting, Coldplay, Nirvana, Muse, and Kings of Leon. The album also features a cello version of Michael Jackson's "Human Nature." The duo said that they chose songs that could be arranged as covers playable on just two cellos. In anticipation of the release, 2Cellos released their second single, "Welcome to the Jungle," a cover of the Guns N' Roses song of the same name.

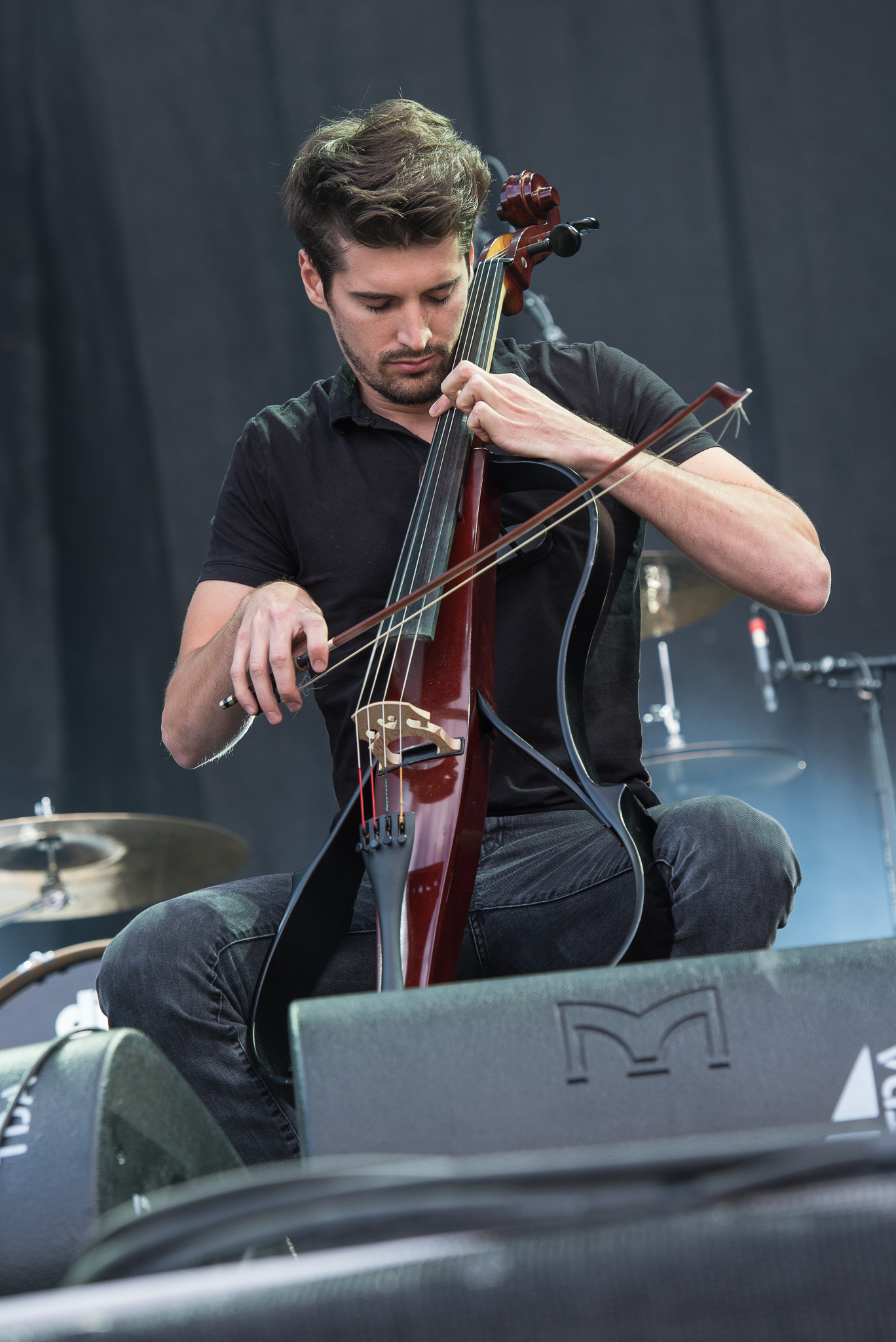
Luka Šulić

Elton John asked the duo to appear with him on his 2011 summer tour, which began in Cardiff, Wales on 8 June. John personally called Šulić and said that he had watched the "Smooth Criminal" video and wanted 2Cellos to participate in his thirty-city tour. The two had previously performed on The Ellen DeGeneres Show of 25 April 2011. 2Cellos also performed at the 2011 iTunes Festival in London. They went on to perform internationally with Elton John and his band for five years, including hundreds of performances at The Colosseum at Caesars Palace in Las Vegas. They appear in The Million Dollar Piano movie filmed at the Colosseum in 2012 and on the 2013 album, The Diving Board.

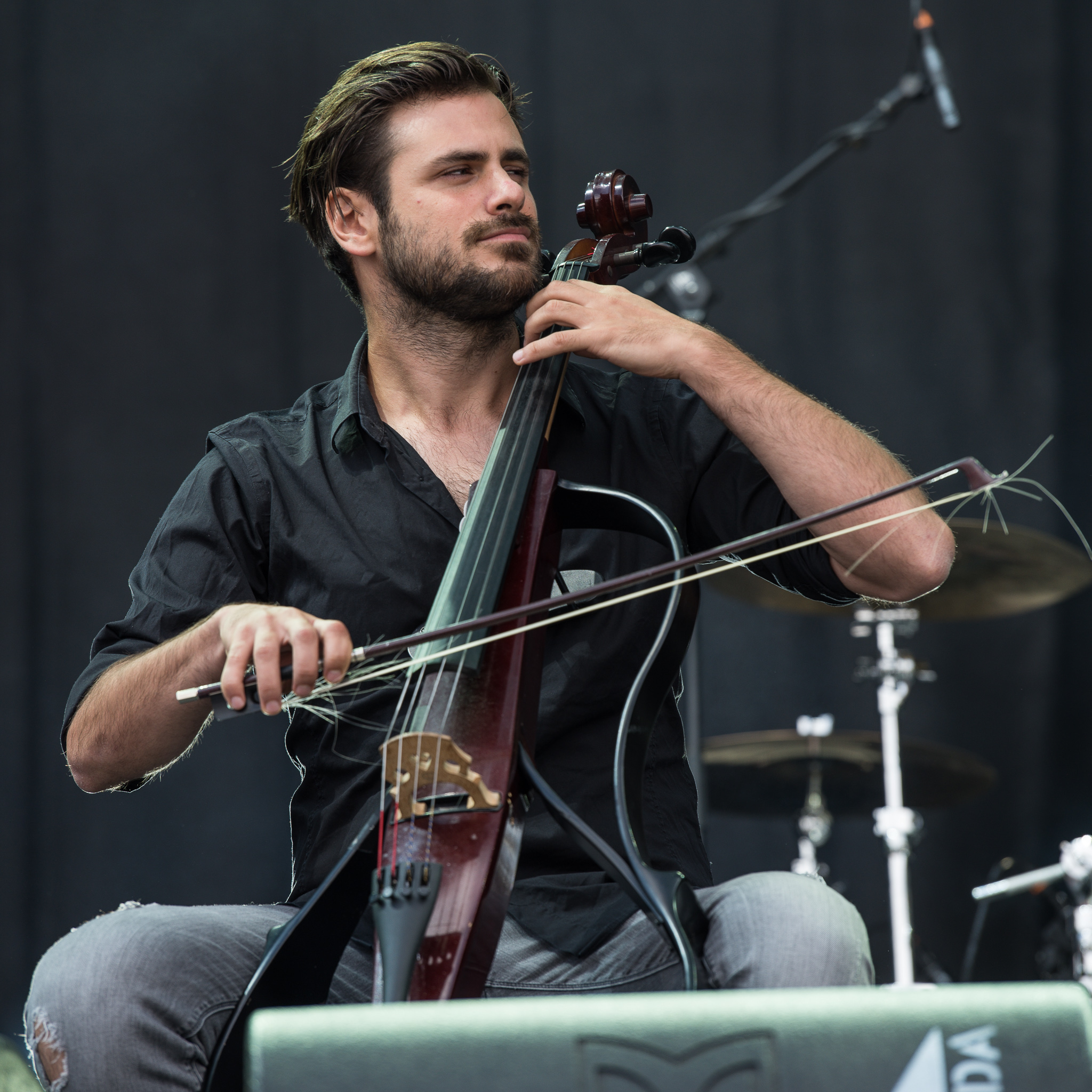
Stjepan Hauser

The duo performed an arrangement of "Smooth Criminal" in the third season of the television show Glee. The episode in which they appeared, titled "Michael", aired on 31 January 2012, and was the first time that the series highlighted instrumental musicians. The scene featuring "Smooth Criminal" was set up similarly to 2Cellos' original music video for the song. On 4 June 2012 2Cellos performed with Elton John at the Queen's Diamond Jubilee Concert at Buckingham Palace. On 12 June 2012, 2Cellos performed in front of a full Arena Zagreb audience. The concert was filmed for DVD: Live at Arena Zagreb.

Although the two usually record covers of rock songs, Šulić and Hauser said they still play with orchestras and will not abandon playing classical music. The cellists said they would someday like to go on tour with both a classical and a contemporary orchestra, a hope that was fulfilled in part during their tour for the album Score. Their second studio album, entitled In2ition, came out early in 2013, and featured new twists on a diverse range of classic tracks with a few surprise vocal and instrumental duet partners including Elton John, Lang Lang, Naya Rivera, Steve Vai, Sky Ferreira and Zucchero. The album was produced by Bob Ezrin.

Other tracks include covers of AC/DC's "Highway to Hell" featuring Vai, Coldplay's "Clocks" featuring Lang Lang, Muse's "Supermassive Black Hole" featuring Rivera, an Italian version of "The Book of Love" by The Magnetic Fields entitled "Il Libro Dell'Amore" featuring Zucchero, Karl Jenkins' "Benedictus", and "Oh Well" featuring Sir Elton.

In July 2013, they filmed a commercial for the Japanese mobile phone company Docomo. Their album In2ition debuted on the Japanese Albums Chart, in August 2013 at number 1. Since then, they have done commercials for the US National Football League Thursday Night Football, for 1906 Reerva Especial and they have done several print campaigns for the Italian designer, s.Oliver.

As a part of their world tour with Elton John, including concerts in North America, Europe and Asia, 2Cellos performed at Madison Square Garden two days in a row, in December 2013. In March 2014, they had a solo Japanese tour.

In 2015, 2Cellos released their third album, Celloverse, which they also co-produced. The album contains a diverse array of renditions including AC/DC's "Thunderstruck", Avicii's "Wake Me Up", Michael Jackson's "They Don't Care About Us", Hans Zimmerʼs "Mombasa" (from Inception), and an original work titled Celloverse, among numerous other covers.

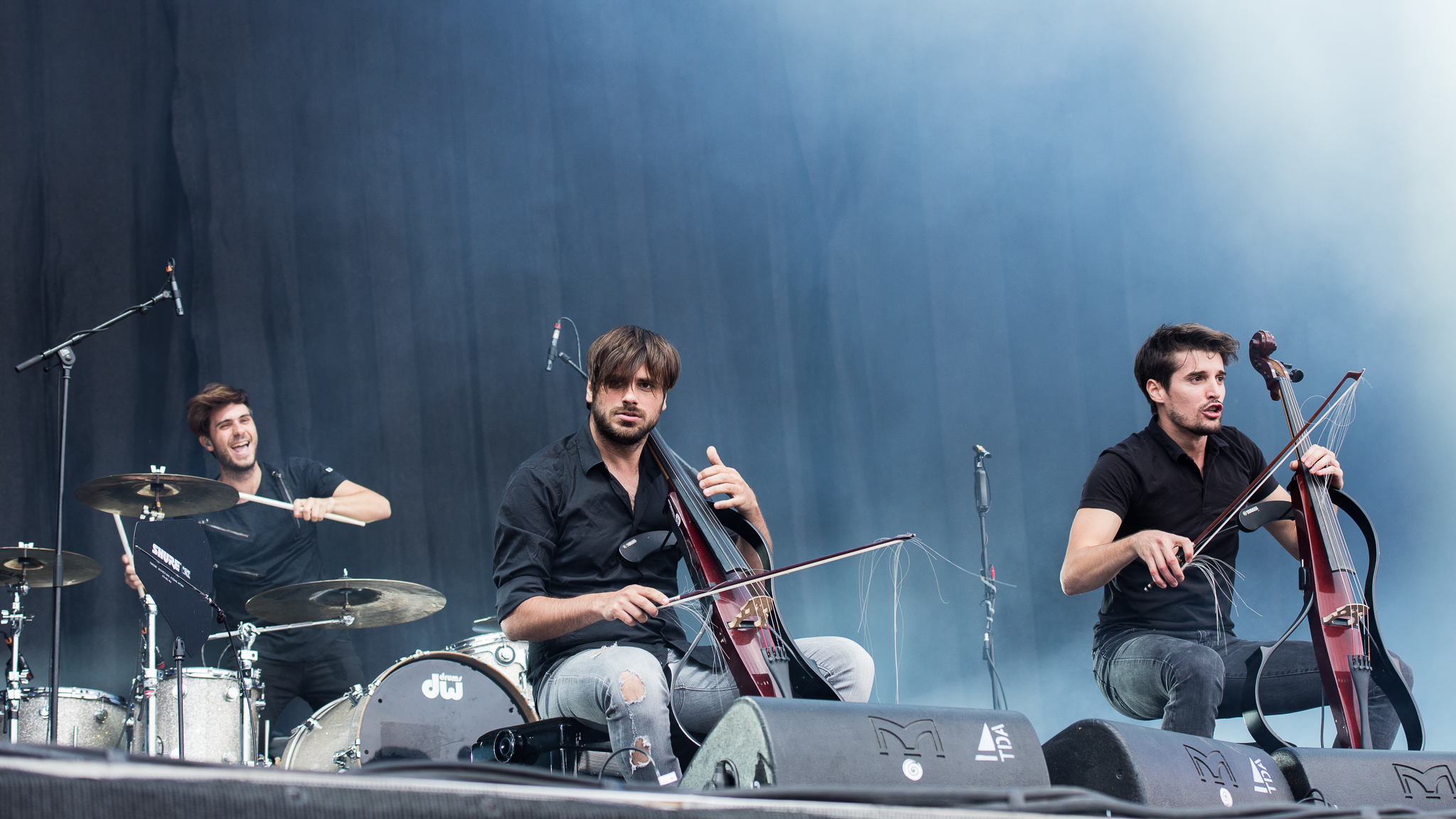
Drummer Dušan Kranjc (born in Pula, Croatia) joined the group in 2011

2Cellos has used YouTube to reach out to their audience, posting videos of notable live performances, including Arena Zagreb (2012), Arena Pula (2013), EXIT Festival (2014), and their fifth anniversary concert at Arena di Verona (2016) in Italy. In February 2014, the duo published their rendition of AC/DC's "Thunderstruck" to YouTube. The video depicts the duo playing before a Baroque audience, which soon finds out that the song is anything but classical. The video went viral at the beginning of March, gathering 10 million views in the first two weeks. As of March 2021, the video has garnered over 200 million views.

As Šulić told The Sydney Morning Herald, "we love AC/DC as much as Bach." Hauser added, "both (AC/DC and Bach) are simple and convincing in what they do."

In 2017, Šulić and Hauser released their fourth album, Score, recorded with the London Symphony Orchestra, which included a wide array of television and film music. To mark the album's release, 2Cellos released their official YouTube video for Game of Thrones Medley, which garnered over one million views in two days.

On 26 May 2018, 2Cellos performed the UEFA Champions League Anthem ahead of the 2018 UEFA Champions League Final between Real Madrid and Liverpool. That same year, they released their fifth album, Let There be Cello. In November 2022, they performed at the Cairo International Film Festival.

The Dedicated World Tour was 2Cellos' farewell tour. Šulić cited focusing on his family as a reason for formally ending his involvement with 2Cellos, while Hauser will continue on with solo work.

== Discography ==
- 2Cellos (2011, Sony Masterworks)
- In2ition (2013, Sony Masterworks)
- Celloverse (2015, Sony Masterworks)
- Score (2017, Sony Masterworks)
- Let There Be Cello (2018, Sony Masterworks)
- Dedicated (2021, Sony Masterworks)

== Tours ==
- International Tours in Europe and the US and Canada 2013
- International Tours in Japan, Australia, Europe and Russia 2014
- International Tours in Australia, the US and Canada, Europe, Japan and other Asian countries, Latin America and Russia 2015
- CELLOVERSE tour: US and Canada, Europe, Latin America and Australia 2016
- The Score World Tour (2017) with orchestral accompaniment
- Let There Be Cello (tour) (2019) (their first Arena tour)
- Dedicated World Tour (2022)

== Awards ==
=== Porin ===
Year	Recipient	Award	Result	Ref.
2012	2Cellos	Best International Album	Won	
2012	"Smooth Criminal"	Best International Song	Won	
2013	In2ition	Best International Album	Nominated	
2014	Live at Arena Zagreb	Best International Video Album	Won	

=== Japan Gold Disc Award ===
Year	Recipient	Award	Result	Ref.
2014	In2ition	Instrumental Album of the Year	Won	
2014	"Kagemusha"	Song of the Year by Download	Won	

=== MTV Europe Music Awards ===
Year	Recipient	Award	Result	Ref.
2015	2Cellos	Best Adria Act	Nominated	

=== Večernjak's Rose ===
Year	Recipient	Award	Result	Ref.
2014	2Cellos	Musicians of the Year	Won	

=== Orders ===
Year	Recipient	Order
2014	Luka Šulić, Stjepan Hauser	Ribbon of an Order of Danica Hrvatska with the face of Marko Marulić
