= Luka Šulić =

Slovenian cellist (born 1987)

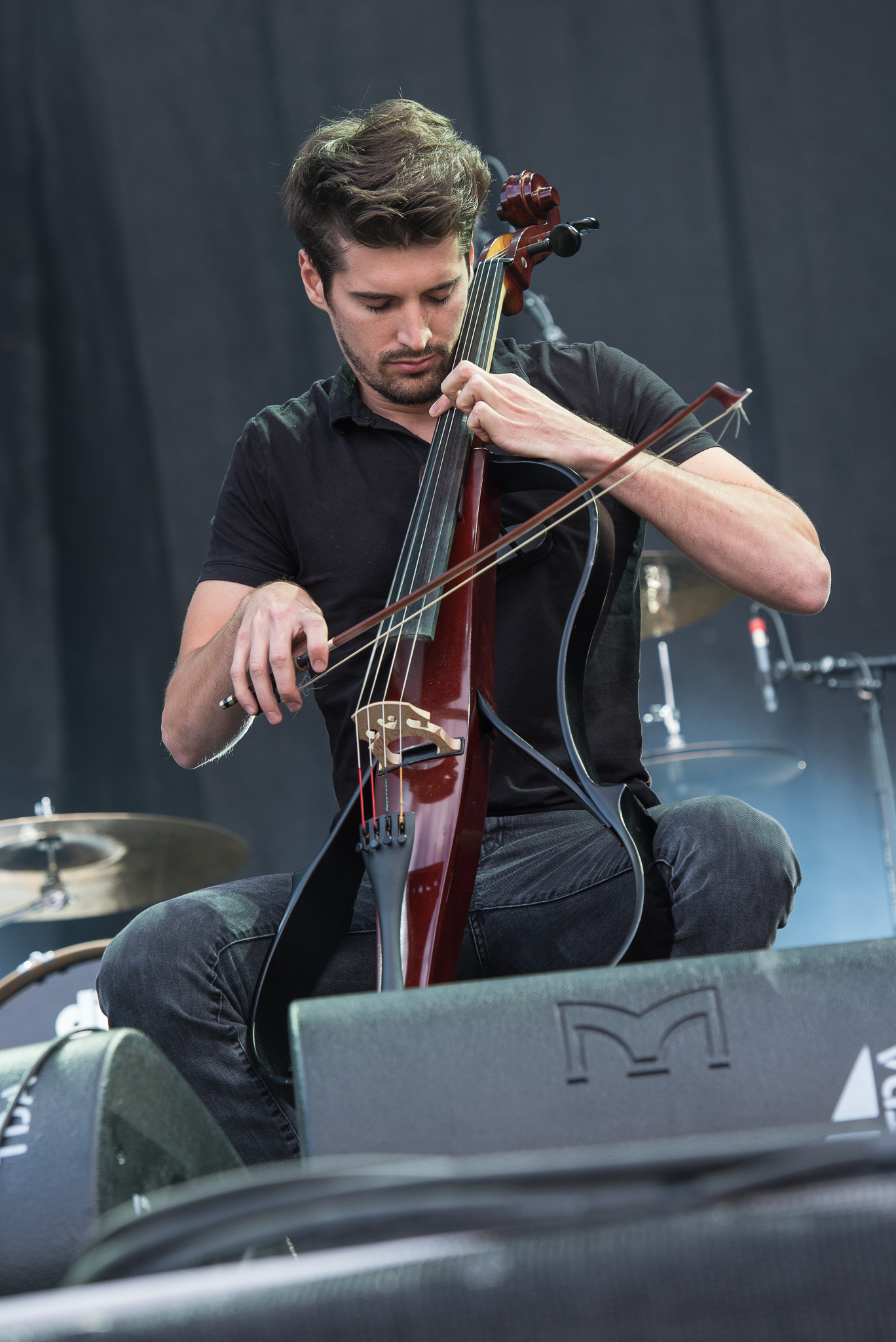
- Luka Šulić in 2017
- Born: 25 August 1987 (age 38); Maribor, SR Slovenia, Yugoslavia
- Occupation: Cellist
- Spouse: Tamara Zagoranski (m. 2017)
- Children: 4

Luka Šulić (born 25 August 1987) is a Croatian-Slovenian cellist. He was a member of 2CELLOS, along with Stjepan Hauser.

== Early life ==
Šulić was born in Maribor, Slovenia. Šulić's father, Božo (through whom Šulić has Croatian citizenship in addition to Slovenian), is from Dubrovnik, Croatia, and his mother, Alja, is from Izola, Slovenia. His father is also a cellist, and many members of his family are associated with music.

== Career ==
Luka Šulić performs throughout the world, combining solo classical performances with those with his fellow 2CELLOS partner. He has won a series of top prizes at prestigious international music competitions, including the first and special prizes at the VII Lutosławski International Cello Competition in Warsaw (2009), first prize at the European Broadcasting Union “New Talent” Competition (2006) and first prize at the Royal Academy of Music Patron’s Award in Wigmore Hall (2011).

He has given a number of solo and chamber music appearances in Europe, South America and Japan in major venues such as Wigmore Hall, Amsterdam Concertgebouw, Vienna Musikverein and Konzerthaus. As a soloist he appeared with orchestras such as Deutsche Radio Philharmonie, Australian Chamber Orchestra, Warsaw Philharmonic, Russian Symphony Orchestra and others.

Šulić began his musical education in Maribor when he was five years old. His father taught him how to play in the beginning and his mother practiced a lot with him. When he was fifteen, he became one of the youngest students ever to enter the Music Academy in Zagreb in the class of Professor Valter Dešpalj, where he graduated aged only 18. He continued his education in Vienna with Professor Reinhard Latzko. Šulić finished his master's degree with Mats Lidstrom at the Royal Academy of Music in London in 2011.

His mainstream success began when he decided to join forces with his friend and a former cello rival Stjepan Hauser. In January 2011, they uploaded a cello version of “Smooth Criminal” by Michael Jackson onto YouTube. Within just a few weeks, their video went viral, receiving over 7 million views almost immediately. This led to a record deal with Sony Masterworks and an invitation to join Elton John on his worldwide tour.

The duo has appeared on national TV shows like The Tonight Show with Jay Leno, The Ellen DeGeneres Show (twice in six months), the Bachelor Wedding (Sean and Catherine), Today with Kathy Lee and Hoda and others internationally, such as Stefan Raab’s TV total in Germany.

In January 2012, they appeared as the special musical guests on Fox’s hit TV series Glee where they performed “Smooth Criminal” in the Michael Jackson tribute episode. This was the first time that an instrumental duo had performed on the show in a guest spot. The 2Cellos’ arrangement of the song, which featured actors Grant Gustin and the late Naya Rivera, debuted at #10 on the Billboard Hot 100 Digital Songs Chart and landed the 2Cellos album in the Top 100.

From 2011 through 2018, as a member of 2CELLOS, Šulić has released 5 albums of assorted musical genres, from pop and rock to classical and movie themes.

After the 2CELLOS US tour ended in 2019, Luka Šulić took a break from the duo to work on independent projects. He released an album Vivaldi: The four Seasons which peaked at #8 in Official Charts' Specialist Classical chart in November 2019. It was recorded in Rome with the Archi dell’Accademia di Santa Cecilia, conducted by Maestro Luigi Piovano. Luka said he has loved Vivaldi’s Four Seasons since he was a child and heard it on a tape in his parents' car. He always wanted to play the pieces on the cello. It took him two years to arrange the pieces for cello, note by note, while he was on tour with 2CELLOS. He chose Rome for recording as Vivaldi was Italian. He hopes the album will bring classical music a wider audience.

From 2019 to 2022, Šulić toured in Europe and Asia with Bulgarian pianist Evgeny Genchev as a duo, performing arrangements of classical and popular music.

== Personal life ==
On 7 July 2017, then 29-year-old Luka Šulić married Tamara Zagoranski in an intimate ceremony in Slovenia. The pair had been together since 2015 and in December 2016 got engaged whilst on holiday in New Zealand. They have two sons and a daughter together.

== Discography ==
- Vivaldi: The four seasons (2019, Sony Masterworks)
- Life (2024, Lukacello d.o.o.)
- along with Stjepan Hauser as 2CELLOS

== Awards ==
=== Orders ===
- Ribbon of an Order of Danica Hrvatska with the face of Marko Marulić for a special contribution to the culture and promotion of Croatia in the world.

=== Competitions ===
- 1st Prize at the Royal Academy of Music Patron’s Award in Wigmore Hall (2011)
- 1st Prize for Schumann Cello Concerto and Special Prize for the best performance of Lutoslawski's Sacher Variations at VII Witold Lutosławski International Cello Competition in Warsaw (2009)
- 1st Prize at European Broadcasting Union "New Talent" Competition (2006)
