= Kaela Kimura discography =

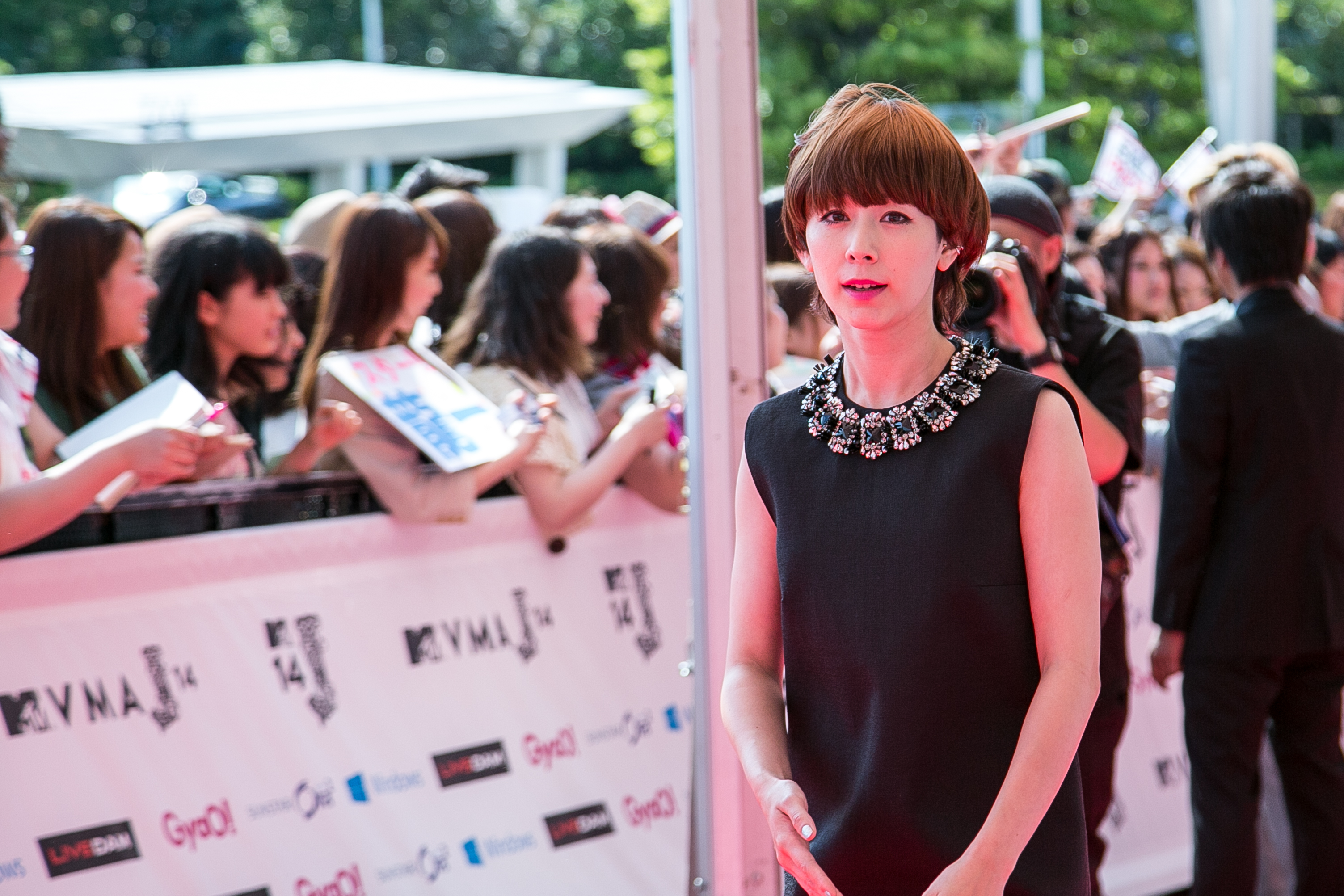
- Kimura at the 2014 MTV Video Music Awards Japan
- Studio albums: 11
- Extended plays: 4
- Compilation albums: 3
- Tribute albums: 1
- Singles: 31
- Video albums: 5

The discography of Japanese musician Kaela Kimura consists of eleven studio albums, three compilation albums, one cover album, four extended plays, thirty-one singles and five video albums. She debuted as a musician in 2004 under the label Columbia Music Entertainment, releasing ten albums with the company. In 2013, Kimura released Rock, an album of English language covers under her private label Ela Music. In 2014, Kimura released "Ole! Oh!", her first single under Victor Entertainment.

Kimura was originally a member of the band Amino before making her solo debut. Two of the band's songs are present on the 2005 compilation album ... of Newtypes. In 2006, Kimura collaborated with the band Sadistic Mika Band as a temporary vocalist on three of their songs on their revival album Narkissos.

Her most commercially successful singles are "Rirura Riruha" (2005), "Butterfly" (2009) and "Ring a Ding Dong" (2010), all of which have been certified Million by the Recording Industry Association of Japan.

== Studio albums ==
All release dates pertain to their release in Japan, unless stated.

List of albums, with selected chart positions
Title	Album details	Peak positions		Sales (JPN) (Note: Sales provided by Oricon database and are rounded to the nearest thousand copies.)	Certifications
Title	Album details	JPN	TWN East Asian (Note: The G-Music chart was established in July 2005 and only archives the top 20 releases. The East Asian chart is a sub-chart, so releases may not have charted on the main top 20.) (Note: Position was taken from 2006 week 19 for Circle, 2007 week 15 for Scratch, 2008 week 20 for +1.)	Sales (JPN)	Certifications
Kaela	Released: December 8, 2004; Label: Columbia; Formats: CD, CD/DVD digital download	8	—	149,000	RIAJ: Gold
Circle	Released: March 8, 2006; Label: Columbia; Formats: CD, CD/DVD, digital download	2	9	197,000	RIAJ: Gold
Scratch	Released: February 7, 2007; Label: Columbia; Formats: CD, CD/DVD, digital download	1	9	360,000	RIAJ: Platinum
+1	Released: April 2, 2008; Label: Columbia; Formats: CD, CD/DVD, digital download	1	9	161,000	RIAJ: Platinum
Hocus Pocus	Released: June 24, 2009; Label: Columbia; Formats: CD, CD/DVD, digital download	3	—	221,000	RIAJ: Platinum
8Eight8	Released: October 12, 2011; Label: Columbia; Formats: CD, CD/DVD, digital download	1	—	75,000	
Sync	Released: December 19, 2012; Label: Columbia; Formats: CD, CD/DVD, digital download	5	—	33,000	
Mieta	Released: December 17, 2014; Label: ELA; Formats: CD, CD/DVD, digital download	6	—	16,000	
Punky	Released: October 19, 2016; Label: ELA; Formats: CD, CD/DVD, digital download	9	—		
Ichigo	Released: July 31, 2019; Label: ELA; Formats: CD, CD/DVD, digital download	11	—	5,170	
Magnetic	Released: December 14, 2022; Label: Colourful, ELA; Formats: CD, CD/Blu-ray, digital download	31	—	2,248	

== Compilation albums ==
List of albums, with selected chart positions
Title	Album details	Peak positions	Sales (JPN)	Certifications
Title	Album details	JPN	Sales (JPN)	Certifications
5 Years	Released: February 3, 2010; Label: Columbia; Formats: CD, 2CD, digital download	2	473,000	RIAJ: 2× Platinum
10 Years	Released: June 25, 2014; Label: Columbia; Formats: CD, CD/DVD, digital download	6	26,000	
20 Years	Released: April 16, 2025; Label: Colourful, ELA; Formats: CD, digital download, streaming	32	1,541	

== Cover album ==
List of cover albums, with selected chart positions
Title	Album details	Peak positions	Sales (JPN)
Title	Album details	JPN	Sales (JPN)
Rock	Released: October 30, 2013; Label: ELA; Formats: CD, digital download	10	19,000

== Extended plays ==
List of extended plays
Title	EP details	Peak positions	Sales (JPN)
Title	EP details	JPN	Sales (JPN)
Live Tour 2010 "5 Tears" @ Nippon Budokan (2010.03.27/28)	Released: June 9, 2010; Label: Columbia; Formats: Digital download	—	
¿Who?	Released: November 21, 2018; Label: Colourful, ELA; Formats: Digital download	20	
Zig Zag	Released: March 4, 2020; Label: Colourful, ELA; Formats: CD, digital download	21	JPN: 2,765
F(u)ntasy	Released: September 25, 2024; Label: Colourful, ELA; Formats: CD, digital download	38	JPN: 1,829

== Singles ==
=== As a lead artist ===
List of singles, with selected chart positions
Title	Year	Peak chart positions		Sales (JPN)	Certifications	Album
Title	Year	Oricon Singles Charts	Billboard Japan Hot 100 (Note: The Japan Hot 100 was established in February 2008.) (Note: Sources for chart positions are as follows: "Jasper", "Moustache", "Memories", "Doko", "Banzai", "Butterfly", "Ring a Ding Dong", "Deep Beep", "A Winter Fairy Is Melting a Snowman", "Kidoairaku Plus Ai", "Mamireru", "Sun Shower", "Ole! Oh!", "Today Is a New Day", "Egg".)	Sales (JPN)	Certifications	Album
"Level 42"	2004	14	—	30,000		Kaela
"Happiness!!!"	2004	11	—	41,000		Kaela
"Rirura Riruha"	2005	3	82 (Note: Charted in 2010.)	117,000	RIAJ (ringtone): Million; RIAJ (cellphone): Gold; RIAJ (physical): Gold	Circle
"Beat"	2005	7	—	36,000	RIAJ (physical): Gold	Circle
"You"	2006	7	—	39,000		Circle
"Magic Music"	2006	7	—	54,000	RIAJ (ringtone): 2× Platinum; RIAJ (cellphone): Gold	Scratch
"Tree Climbers"	2006	6	—	68,000	RIAJ (ringtone): 2× Platinum; RIAJ (cellphone): Gold; RIAJ (physical): Gold	Scratch
"Snowdome"	2007	6	—	61,000	RIAJ (cellphone): Gold; RIAJ (physical): Gold	Scratch
"Samantha"	2007	8	—	27,000		+1
"Yellow"	2007	5	—	28,000		+1
"Jasper"	2008	9	11	42,000	RIAJ (cellphone): Gold	+1
"Moustache" (マスタッシュ, Musutasshu)	2008	7	9	37,000		Hocus Pocus
"Memories"	2008	7	43	37,000		Paco and the Magical Book Original Soundtrack
"Doko" (どこ; "Where")	2009	5	5	24,000		Hocus Pocus
"Banzai"	2009	4	2	31,000		Hocus Pocus
"Butterfly"	2009	—	8	—	RIAJ (ringtone): Million; RIAJ (cellphone): Million; RIAJ (PC): Platinum; RIAJ (streaming): Gold	Hocus Pocus
"Ring a Ding Dong"	2010	1	2	92,000	RIAJ (ringtone): Million; RIAJ (cellphone): Platinum; RIAJ (PC): Gold; RIAJ (physical): Gold	8Eight8
"Deep Beep"	2010	—	23	—		8Eight8
"A Winter Fairy Is Melting a Snowman"	2010	4	1	30,000	RIAJ (ringtone): 2× Platinum; RIAJ (cellphone): Gold; RIAJ (PC): Gold	8Eight8
"Kidoairaku Plus Ai"	2011	13	6	13,000		8Eight8
"Mamireru" (マミレル; "Paint")	2012	9	6	17,000		Sync
"Sun Shower"	2012	16	4	8,000		Sync
"Ole! Oh!"	2014	12	10	6,000		Mieta
"Today Is a New Day"	2014	15	10	8,000		Mieta
"Egg"	2015	17	7	8,000		Punky
"Holidays"	2017	23	55			Non-album single
"Washi Mo no Uta"	2017	—	—			Non-album single
"Chiisana Eiyu (Modest Heroes)"	2018	—	—			¿Who?
"Tokeino Hari (Aishite Mo Anata ga Tooku Naru no)"	2020	—	—			Zig Zag
"Color Me" (featuring Mahi to the People)	2022	—	—			Magnetic
"Magnetic" (featuring Ai)	2022	—	—			Magnetic
"Que Sera, Sera" (ケセラセラ)	2023	—	—			F(u)ntasy
"Dahlia"	2024	—	—			F(u)ntasy
"Cheese" (チーズ)	2024	—	—			F(u)ntasy

=== As a featured artist ===
List of singles, with selected chart positions
Title	Year	Peak chart positions		Album
Title	Year	Oricon Singles Charts	Billboard Japan Hot 100 (Note: Sources for chart positions are as follows: "Hey! Hey! Alright".)	Album
"Time Machine ni Onegai '06 Version" (タイムマシンにおねがい; "Help, Time Machine") (Sadistic Mika Band Revisited)	2006	—	—	Narkissos
"Hey! Hey! Alright" (Scha Dara Parr + Kaela Kimura)	2009	10	10	11
"Tadaima to Okaeri" (ただいまとおかえり) (Taiiku Okazaki featuring Kaela Kimura)	2019	—	—	Pokémon the Movie

=== Promotional singles ===
Title	Year	Peak chart positions	Certifications	Album
Title	Year	Billboard Japan Hot 100 (Note: Sources for chart positions are as follows: "Dive Into Shallow", "Stars", "Odoru Pompokolin", "You Bet!!", "Chocolate", "Hello, Goodbye", "Wonder Volt", "Take On Me", "Funkytown", "My Love", "One More", "Sonic Manic".)	Certifications	Album
"Circle"	2006	—		Circle
"Oh Pretty Woman"	2006	—		Attention Please Soundtrack
"Ground Control"	2007	—		Scratch
"Dive Into Shallow"	2008	30		"Jasper" (single)
"Stars"	2008	26		+1
"Hot Pepper no Uta" (ホットペッパーの唄; "Hot Pepper Song")	2009	—	RIAJ (ringtone): 2× Platinum	Non-album single
"Odoru Pompokolin"	2010	48		5 Years
"You Bet!!"	2010	6		5 Years
"Musuko (Bokura no Ongaku Ver.)" (息子(僕らの音楽ver.); "Son (Our Music Ver.)") (with Tamio Okuda)	2010	—		Non-album song
"Chocolate" (チョコレート, Chokorēto)	2011	6		8Eight8
"8Eight8 Medley" (8EIGHT8 メドレー)	2011	—		Non-album song
"Lettuce Lettuce" (レタスレタス, Retasu Retasu)	2012	—		2355/0655 Song Best!
"Amamorhythm" (アマモリズム, Amamorizumu; "Rain Leak Rhythm")	2012	—		2355/0655 Song Best!
"Hello, Goodbye"	2012	43		"Sun Shower" (single)
"Wonder Volt"	2012	63		Sync
"Take On Me"	2013	45		Rock
"Funkytown"	2013	70		Rock
"My Love"	2014	71		10 Years
"One More"	2014	80		Mieta
"Sonic Manic"	2014	22		Mieta

== Video albums ==
List of media, with selected chart positions
Title	Album details	Peak positions
Title	Album details	JPN
Kaela Kimura 1st Tour 2005 4You	Released: July 6, 2005; Label: Columbia; Formats: DVD	10
Live Scratch: Agattemasu tteba Tour @ Budokan (LIVE SCRATCH～上がってますってばTOUR～＠武道館)	Released: September 19, 2007; Label: Columbia; Formats: DVD	14
Best Video 1	Released: July 23, 2008; Label: Columbia; Formats: DVD	6
Go! 5! Kaeland	Released: November 4, 2009; Label: Columbia; Formats: DVD	5
Kaela Web Tour 2012 @ Nippon Budokan	Released: August 1, 2012; Label: Columbia; Formats: DVD	7

== Other appearances ==
List of non-studio album or guest appearances that feature Kaela Kimura
Title	Year	Album
"Twinkle (Nana Ver.)"	2005	Love for Nana: Only One Tribute
"Is My Fate" (Note: Band featuring Kimura before she debuted as a solo musician.) (Animo)	2005	... of Newtypes
"Out of Luck" (Animo)	2005	... of Newtypes
"Why Are You So in a Hurry? (Tō-chan no Melody)" (父ちゃんのメロディ; "Daddy's Melody")	2005	Custom Made 10.30 Original Soundtrack
"Why Are You So in a Hurry? (Tō-chan no Melody) (Dub Mix)"	2005	Custom Made 10.30 Original Soundtrack
"Cloudy" (Kaela Kimura & Foe)	2006	Last Days: Tribute to Mr. K
"The End of the Sun" (Foe featuring Kaela Kimura)	2006	Foetunes
"Sadistic Twist" (Sadistic Mikaela Band)	2006	Narkissos
"Watashi wa Big-Bang, Bang" (私はBig-Bang, Bang; "I'm a Big-Bang, Bang") (Sadistic Mikaela Band)	2006	Narkissos
"No Reason Why" (Farrah featuring Kaela Kimura)	2007	"No Reason Why" (single)
"Marshmallow" (マシマロ, Mashimaro)	2007	Tamio Okuda Covers
"Birdie" (Taiyō Yamazaki presents Kaela Kimura & Depapepe)	2008	Music Tree
"Rirura Riruha (Kōtetsu Gattai Robomix) Remixed by Foe" (リルラ リルハ～鋼鉄合体ロボミックス～Remixed by FOE"; "Steel Alloy Robomix")	2008	Detroit Metal City Tribute Album: Seinie Metal Mix
"[[Kokuhaku (Idoling!!! song)|Kokuhaku]]" (Note: Featuring lyrics written by Kimura.) (Idolin!!!)	2008	Petit-Petit
"Paco Medley" (Kaela Kimura with Hōtai Band)	2008	Paco and the Magical Book Original Soundtrack
"A Song for Paco" (Kaela Kimura with Hōtai Band)	2008	Paco and the Magical Book Original Soundtrack
"Kimi to Dokomade mo" (君とどこまでも; "Anywhere with You") (Mo'Some Tonebender featuring Kaela Kimura)	2008	Sing!
"Happy?"	2009	Judy and Mary 15th Anniversary Tribute Album
"Mother Goose" (Rie Tomosaka)	2009	Toridori.
"Forbidden Fruits" (Curly Giraffe featuring Kaela Kimura)	2009	Thank You for Being a Friend
"Kotoba wa Sankaku, Kokoro wa Shikaku" (言葉はさんかく こころは四角; "Words Are Triangles, Hearts Are Squares")	2009	Quruli Tribute
"Lyin' Ass Bitch" (Scafull King featuring Kaela Kimura)	2011	Doubt!
"Ring a Ding Dong (Moonbug Remix)"	2013	Remix Assault
"Banzai (Remix)" (Avengers in Sci-Fi)	2013	Selected Ancient Works 2006-2013
