= 5 Years (album) =

Greatest hits album by Kaela Kimura
- Released: February 3, 2010
- Genre: J-pop
- Length: 69:06 (Disc 1); 44:45 (Disc 2)
- Label: Columbia

Kaela Kimura chronology
HOCUS POCUS (2009)	5 Years (2010)	8Eight8 (2011)

Alternative cover
- Limited edition cover

5 Years is the first best of album by Japanese pop singer Kaela Kimura, released on February 3, 2010. The limited edition release includes a second disk.

== Track listing ==
Disc 1
No.	Title	Lyrics	Music	Arranger(s)	Length
1.	"You bet!!"	Kaela Kimura, Shinobu Watanabe (Asparagus)	Shinobu Watanabe (Asparagus)	Shinobu Watanabe	3:50
2.	"Butterfly"	Kaela Kimura	Atsushi Suemitsu(Suemitsu & the Suemith)	Atsushi Suemitsu	4:17
3.	"BANZAI" (バンザイ "Cheers")	Kaela Kimura	Taro Kohata (Avengers in Sci-Fi)	Avengers in Sci-Fi	4:35
4.	"Doko" (どこ "Where")	Shinobu Watanabe (Asparagus)	Shinobu Watanabe (Asparagus)	Shinobu Watanabe	4:05
5.	"Moustache"	Kaela Kimura	AxSxE (BOaT, Natsumen)	AxSxE	3:54
6.	"memories(original version)"	Kaela Kimura	Takeshi Shibuya	Masao Nisugi, Gabriele Roberto	4:07
7.	"Jasper"	Kaela Kimura	Takkyu Ishino (Denki Groove)	Takkyu Ishino	3:46
8.	"Yellow"	Kaela Kimura	Shinobu Watanabe (Asparagus)	Shinobu Watanabe	3:20
9.	"Samantha"	Kaela Kimura	Shigekazu Aida (El-Malo, HiGE)	Shigekazu Aida	4:08
10.	"Snowdome"	Kaela Kimura	Beat Crusaders		4:40
11.	"TREE CLIMBERS"	Shinobu Watanabe (Asparagus)	Shinobu Watanabe (Asparagus)	Shinobu Watanabe	3:16
12.	"Magic Music"	Kaela Kimura	Linus of Hollywood		2:55
13.	"You"	Shinobu Watanabe (Asparagus)	Shinobu Watanabe (Asparagus)	Shinobu Watanabe	4:33
14.	"BEAT"	Kaela Kimura	Tamio Okuda (Unicorn)	Tamio Okuda	4:46
15.	"Rirura Riruha" (リルラ リルハ "Real Life Real Heart")	Kaela Kimura	Shigekazu Aida (El-Malo, HiGE)	Shigekazu Aida	3:53
16.	"happiness!!!"	Kaela Kimura	Taiyō Yamazaki	Seiji Mutō	5:00
17.	"Level42"	Kaela Kimura	Taiyō Yamazawa	Seiji Mutō	4:11

Disc 2 (Limited edition only)
No.	Title	Lyrics	Music	Arranger(s)	Length
1.	"Kamereon-Nisei" (カメレオン2世 "Chameleon-Junior")	Kaela Kimura	Shigekazu Aida	Shigekazu Aida	3:43
2.	"Hey! Hey! Alright"	Scha Dara Parr, Kaela Kimura	Scha Dara Parr, Shinya Kogure (Hicksville)		4:00
3.	"Oh, Pretty Woman" (cover song)	Roy Orbison and Bill Dees	Roy Orbison and Bill Dees	Shigekazu Aida	2:18
4.	"Kotoba wa Sankaku, Kokoro wa Shikaku (言葉はさんかく こころは四角, Words Are Triangles, Hearts Are Squares)" (Quruli cover)	Shigeru Kishida	Shigeru Kishida	Keisaku Nakamura	4:04
5.	"Ririan" (リリアン "Lillian")	Kaela Kimura	Seiji Kameda	Seiji Kameda	4:15
6.	"Cloudy"	Kaela Kimura	Shigekazu Aida	Shigekazu Aida	5:06
7.	"Mirakuru.BANZAI (ミラクル☆BANZAI, Miracle-Cheers) feat. Ilmari"	Kaela Kimura, Ilmari	Taro Kohata	Halfby	3:51
8.	"Forbidden Fruits feat. Kaela Kimura" (Curly Giraffe's song)	Genie Clash	Curly Giraffe	Curly Giraffe	4:52
9.	"darling"	Kaela Kimura	Shigekazu Aida	Shigekazu Aida	3:11
10.	"Odoru Ponpokorin" (おどるポンポコリン "Dancing Ponpokorin")	Momoko Sakura	Tetsurō Oda	Takkyu Ishino	3:12
11.	"Mashimaro (マシマロ, Marshmallow)" (Tamio Okuda cover)	Tamio Okuda	Tamio Okuda	Shinobu Watanabe	2:19
12.	"Happy?" (Judy and Mary)	Yuki	Takuya	AxSxE	3:50
