= Magnetic (Kaela Kimura album) =

Studio album by Kaela Kimura
- Released: December 14, 2022
- Length: 37:40
- Language: Japanese; English
- Label: Colourful; ELA

Kaela Kimura chronology
Zig Zag (2020)	Magnetic (2022)	F(u)ntasy (2024)

Singles from Magnetic
- 1. "Color Me" Released: July 1, 2022; 2. "Magnetic" Released: December 14, 2022

Magnetic is the eleventh studio album by Japanese singer Kaela Kimura, released on December 14, 2022, by Colourful Records and ELA. Wanting to have an album featuring collaborations with other artists, Kimura worked with Japanese-American singer Ai, Japanese hip hop group Sanabagun and singer Mahi to the People.

Upon the release of the album, Magnetic debuted and peaked at number 31 on the Oricon Albums Chart and number 33 on the Billboard Japan Hot Albums chart.

== Background ==
Kaela Kimura previously released her tenth studio album, Ichigo, in 2019. The album was her first studio album to not chart in the top ten of the Oricon Albums Chart. She released an extended play, Zig Zag, which peaked at number 21 on the Japanese charts.

In June 2022, Kimura announced her new single "Color Me" featuring Mahi to the People would be released on July 1. In November, Magnetic was announced as her eleventh studio album, with a release date slated for December 14. Regarding the title of the album, Kimura stated that "magnetism attracts things" including "people and attractiveness".

== Release and promotion ==
Magnetic was released on December 14, 2022. Victor Entertainment announced two physical versions of the album. The regular version would contain a CD while a Blu-Ray bonus disc would be included on a limited-edition version of the album. As standard in Japan, a first press release was also available. Victor additionally announced copies bought directly from their online store and HMV would include additional bonus items.

In promotion of the album, Kimura appeared on The First Take. She performed a solo version of the title track. A tour was announced to take place from May 2023 to June. On the same day Magnetic was released, the title track was sent to Japanese radio. In January 2023, a music video for the title track was released.

== Track listing ==
Magnetic track listing
No.	Title	Writer(s)	Length
1.	"Ware Ware wa?" (ワレワレワ?)	Open Reel Ensemble	1:08
2.	"Magnetic" (featuring Ai)	Kaela Kimura; Ai Carina Uemura	3:04
3.	"Inokashira Days" (井の頭Days) (featuring Sanabagun)	Kimura; Sanabagun	4:30
4.	"Noise Cancelling" (ノイズキャンセリング)	Kimura	4:08
5.	"Arie Nai Kamo" (ありえないかも)	Kimura	3:38
6.	"Tawai mo Nai" (たわいもない)	Iri	4:30
7.	"Abra Cadabra"	Kimura	3:24
8.	"Castanets" (カスタネット)	Kimura	3:47
9.	"Color Me" (featuring Mahi to the People)	Kimura; MahitothePeople	4:39
10.	"S-N"	Open Reel Ensemble	4:48
Total length:			37:40

Magnetic – limited edition Blu-ray bonus live performances from Billboard Live 2022 and Zepp Tour 2022
No.	Title	Length
1.	"So I"
2.	"You Bet!!"
3.	"Ground Control"
4.	"Rirura Riruha" (リルラ リルハ)
5.	"Season"
6.	"Chocolate" (チョコレート)
7.	"Butterfly"
8.	"Wonder Volt"
9.	"Zig Zag" (featuring Bim)
10.	"Beat"
11.	"Yellow"
12.	"Magic Music"
13.	"Whatever Are You Looking For?"
14.	"Noise Cancelling"
15.	"Color Me"

Notes

- Tracks 1–13 of the limited-edition bonus Blu-ray are noted as "Kaelab Presents Billboard Live 2022"
- Tracks 14 and 15 of the limited-edition bonus Blu-ray are noted as "Kaelab Presents Zepp Tour 2022 Contrast"

== Charts ==
Chart (2022)	Peak position
Japanese Albums (Oricon)	31
Japanese Hot Albums (Billboard Japan)	33
