= Acoustic Samurai =

Live album by Paul Gilbert
- Released: 3 July 2003
- Recorded: Tokyo, Japan, 2003
- Genre: Acoustic rock
- Length: 57:56
- Label: Mascot Records
- Producer: Paul Gilbert

Paul Gilbert chronology
Gilbert Hotel (2003)	Acoustic Samurai (2003)	Space Ship One (2005)

Paul Gilbert live chronology
Beehive Live (1999)	Acoustic Samurai (2003)

Professional ratings
Review scores
Source	Rating
Allmusic	2.5/5 stars
Classic Rock	3/5 stars

Acoustic Samurai is an acoustic live solo album by Paul Gilbert, guitarist of the heavy metal band Racer X and of the hard rock band Mr. Big. It was recorded live in Tokyo's Hard Rock Cafe and released in 2003.

== Track listing ==
All tracks by Paul Gilbert, except where noted

1. "Potato Head" - 2:07
2. "Dancing Queen" (Benny Andersson, Björn Ulvaeus, Stig Anderson) - 3:30 (ABBA cover)
3. "I Like Rock" - 2:19
4. "Down to Mexico" - 4:57
5. "Suicide Lover" (Gilbert, Linus of Hollywood) - 3:39
6. "I Am Satan" (Gilbert, Linus of Hollywood) - 3:02
7. "Individually Twisted" - 4:10
8. "Bliss" - 5:33
9. "Time to Let You Go" (Donnie Vie) - 3:14
10. "I'm Not Afraid of the Police" - 3:48
11. "Three Times Rana" - 4:42
12. "The Second Loudest Guitar in the World" - 2:04
13. "Scarified" (Gilbert, Scott Travis) - 3:41
14. "Heaven in '74" - 3:51
15. "Maybe I'll Die Tomorrow" (ending theme from the movie Aragami) - 3:59
16. "Always for Alison" (Juan Alderete, Gilbert, Jeff Martin, Travis) - 3:20
