= Kaela (disambiguation) =

Kaela may refer to:

- Kaela Berg (born 1973), American politician
- Kaela Davis (born 1995), American professional basketball player
- Kaela Edwards (born 1993), American middle-distance runner
- Kaela Hansen (born 2000), Canadian professional soccer
- Kaela Kimura (born 1984), Japanese pop rock singer, lyricist, fashion model and television presenter.
  - Kaela, 2004 album by Kaela Kimura
- Kaela Kovalskia, Hololive Indonesia vtuber
- Kaela Pflumm (born 1991), American pair skater
- Kaela Sinclair, Keyboardist of M83 band
