= Beehive Live =

Live album by Paul Gilbert
- Released: November 2, 1999
- Genre: Hard rock, power pop, pop rock
- Length: 60:24
- Label: Shrapnel
- Producer: Paul Gilbert

Paul Gilbert chronology
Flying Dog (1998)	Beehive Live (1999)	Alligator Farm (2000)

Paul Gilbert live chronology
Beehive Live (1999)	Acoustic Samurai (2003)

Professional ratings
Review scores
Source	Rating
Allmusic	3/5 stars

Beehive Live is a live album by Paul Gilbert, formerly of the heavy metal band Racer X and the hard rock band Mr. Big. It was released in 1999.

== Track listing ==
No.	Title	Writer(s)	Length
1.	"Heavy Disco Trip"	Paul Gilbert	3:25
2.	"Be My Wife"	Gilbert	5:25
3.	"Get It"	Gilbert	2:33
4.	"Mr. Skin" (Originally recorded by Spirit)	Jay Ferguson	4:48
5.	"Down to Mexico"	Gilbert	3:44
6.	"Girls Who Can Read Your Mind"	Gilbert	3:27
7.	"Tell the Truth"	Gilbert	7:41
8.	"Bumblebee"	Gilbert	4:22
9.	"Million Dollar Smile"	Gilbert	2:18
10.	"Hold Her Tight" (Originally recorded by The Osmonds)	Alan Osmond, Merrill Osmond, Wayne Osmond	3:31
11.	"I'm Just in Love"	Gilbert	2:39
12.	"Red Rooster"	Gilbert	5:36
13.	"To Be with You" (Originally recorded by Mr. Big)	Eric Martin, David Grahame	5:41
14.	"Karn Evil 9" (Originally recorded by Emerson, Lake & Palmer)	Keith Emerson, Greg Lake, Peter Sinfield	5:15
Total length:			60:24

== Notes ==
- Many of the tracks appear on the Eleven Thousand Notes DVD. "Heavy Disco Trip", "Karn Evil 9", and "Bumblebee" are the only tunes missing
- On the song "Tell the Truth", the band breaks into a blues riff that was originally heard on the song "Double Trouble" on Paul's first solo album King of Clubs. The final tune on the album "The Jam" is entirely that same riff, while Gilbert solos over it
- All noted tracks are arranged by Paul Gilbert.

== Personnel ==
- Paul Gilbert - Guitar, vocals, mixing, producer, Audio Production
- Billy Morris - Guitar, background vocals
- Jeff Martin - Drums, background vocals
- Mike Szuter - Bass guitar, background vocals
- Scotty Johnson - Guitar, keyboards, background vocals

=== Production ===
- Steve Hall - Mastering
- Tom Size - Engineer
- Recording information - Tokyo at Shibuya On Air East
- Hiroyuki Yoshihama - Photography
- William James - Cover Photo
- Larry Freemantle - Art Direction
