= Linus of Hollywood =

American songwriter

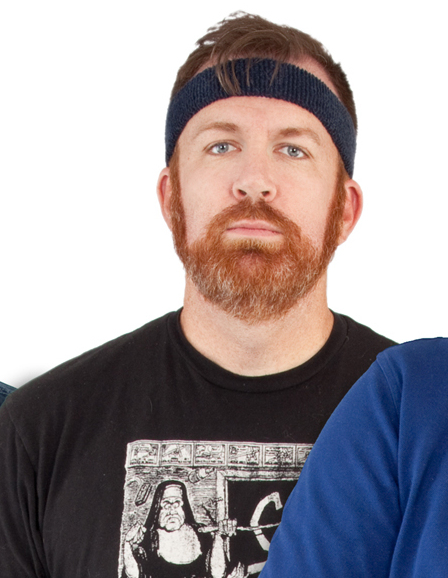

Background information
- Born: Kevin Dotson; March 4, 1973 (age 53); Omaha, Nebraska, U.S.
- Genres: Rock; pop punk; alternative rock; power pop
- Occupations: Singer; Songwriter; Multi-instrumentalist; Record producer
- Instruments: Vocals; guitar; drums; bass; piano; keyboards; percussion
- Years active: 1995–present
- Labels: Crappy Records, Franklin Castle Recordings, Oglio
- Spinoffs: Size 14; Nerf Herder; Able Machines
- Website: linusofhollywood.com

Kevin Dotson (born March 4, 1973), better known by stage names Linus of Hollywood and Linus Dotson, is an American singer, songwriter, multi-instrumentalist, and record producer. The stage name comes from his early days in Los Angeles, where he would frequently wear striped shirts similar to the Peanuts character Linus van Pelt. He is currently a member of Nerf Herder, comedy duo Jarinus and electronic rock duo Able Machines.

== Early life ==
Dotson was born in Omaha, Nebraska, but spent his formative years in Florida. At age five, he learned to play guitar. He would later learn to play drums, bass, and piano as well.

== Career ==
At age 21, he moved to Los Angeles to pursue a career in music. In 1995 Dotson started his professional career as the leader of punk/pop band Size 14, named after his shoe size. The band broke up in 1998 and Dotson began playing and producing on other people's recordings.

=== Solo career ===
In 1999, Dotson released his first solo album Your Favorite Record on his own label called Franklin Castle Recordings. He performed nearly everything on the album, both instrumentally and vocally. He has since released four more albums: Let Yourself Be Happy (2001), Triangle (2006), Attractive Singles (2008), and Reheat & Serve (2008). The single for "A Girl That I Like" was released in 2011.

Dotson released his fourth solo album in 2014 titled Something Good and fifth solo album Cabin Life in 2018.

=== Touring musician ===
In the mid 2000s, Dotson played bass guitar for Paul Gilbert on the Burning Organ tour (2002), Acoustic Samurai tour (2003), and the Space Ship One tour (2005). He also played bass for Roger Joseph Manning, Jr. on both of his tours.

=== Band member ===
In 2010 he formed the band Palmdale with former Letters to Cleo vocalist/songwriter Kay Hanley and released two EPs, Get Wasted and How To Be Mean.

Linus is active in the Los Angeles duo Able Machines. Able Machines features Los Angeles singer/hit songwriter Tay Côlieé and Linus as songwriter, producer and all instruments.

Able Machines so far have self released two studio albums, in 2022 Pathological and in 2023 Digital Precision, the later of which featured a cover of The Pixies track Where Is My Mind.

=== Collaborations with other artists ===
Artists Dotson has worked with include Allstar Weekend, 5 Seconds of Summer, Mr. Big, Bowling for Soup, Cheap Trick, The Charlatans, The Dollyrots, Gabriel Mann (of The Rescues), Gush, Jennifer Lopez, Jennifer Love Hewitt, Kaela Kimura, Kiera Chaplin, Kool Keith, Kylee, Laura Dawn, Lil' Kim, The Leftovers, Margo Guryan, MC Lars, Mis-Teeq, Nerf Herder, Ol' Dirty Bastard, OPM, Parry Gripp, Paul Gilbert, People on Vacation, Probyn Gregory (of The Wondermints), Puffy AmiYumi, Roger Joseph Manning, Jr., Rx Bandits, Puff Daddy, The Smashing Pumpkins, Tim Burgess, and Wisely.

== Production ==
Dotson is the co-owner of pop/punk label Crappy Records with Bowling for Soup frontman Jaret Reddick.

== Television ==
Dotson co-wrote the theme song for Nickelodeon's School of Rock and writes music for the show as well. He composed for Mattel's "Team Hot Wheels", "Battleclaw," and "Barbie Spy Squad." His solo music has been included in the TV shows Weeds, Californication, and The New Normal. He also appeared as an actor in the season finale episode of The New Normal and performed in an episode of TNT's Rizzoli & Isles.

== Bands ==
Band	Position	Years active
Size 14	Lead vocals, guitar	1995–1998
Nerf Herder	Guitar, keyboards	2008–present
Jarinus	Guitar, keyboards, vocals, percussion	2009–present
Palmdale	Guitar, bass, keyboards, vocals	2009–2010
People on Vacation	Keyboards, guitar	2010 – 2016

== Discography ==
=== Size 14 ===
- Size 14 (1997)

=== Solo albums ===
- Your Favorite Record (1999)
- Let Yourself Be Happy (2001)
- Triangle (2006)
- Attractive Singles (2008)
- Reheat & Serve (2008)
- Something Good (2014)
- Cabin Life (2018)

=== Jarinus ===
- "Parry Gripp Birthday Song" (2010)
- Jarinus Rhymes With Vaginus (2013)
- "Shit Shower, and Shave" (2023)

=== Palmdale ===
- Get Wasted (EP, 2010)
- How To Be Mean (EP, 2010)

=== Other appearances ===
- Margo Guryan – "Shine" (2000)
- Margo Guryan – "Sunday Morning"
- Paul Gilbert – Burning Organ (2002) – Keyboards, backing vocals, engineer
- Paul Gilbert – Acoustic Samurai (2003)
- Tim Burgess – "We All Need Love" – I Believe (2003) – Writing credits
- Tim Burgess – "Years Ago" – I Believe (2003) – Writing credits
- Paul Gilbert – "Time to Let You Go" – Gilbert Hotel (2003) – Guitars and vocals
- Mis-Teeq – "Style (Linus of Hollywood's Rock Mix)" – Eye Candy (2003)
- The Charlatans – "Try Again Today" – Up at the Lake (2004) – Writing credits
- Paul Gilbert – Space Ship One (2005) – Bass guitar
- Darling Thieves – Embrace the Curse (2007) – Producer
- Kaela Kimura – "Magic Music" – Scratch (2007) – Writing credits
- MC Lars – This Gigantic Robot Kills (2009)
- Kaela Kimura – "Magic Music" – 5 Years (2010) – Writing credits
- People on Vacation – The Carry On EP (2011)
