= Paul the Young Dude/The Best of Paul Gilbert =

Greatest hits album by Paul Gilbert
- Released: June 3, 2003
- Genre: Heavy metal
- Length: 93:31
- Label: Universal Records; UICE-9006

Paul Gilbert chronology
Burning Organ (2002)	Paul the Young Dude/The Best of Paul Gilbert (2003)	Gilbert Hotel (2003)

Paul the Young Dude/The Best of Paul Gilbert is an album by Paul Gilbert of the heavy metal band Racer X and subsequently the hard rock band Mr. Big. It was initially released with the bonus CD Gilbert Hotel.

== Track listing ==
All songs written by Paul Gilbert except where noted.

1. "I'm Not Afraid of the Police" – 3:37
2. "I Feel the Earth Move (Carole King song)" – 2:57 (Carole King)
3. "My Religion" – 3:20
4. "Down to Mexico" – 3:30
5. "Superloud" – 4:28
6. "Individually Twisted" – 4:06
7. "Kate Is a Star" – 4:56 (Gilbert/Russ Parrish)
8. "G.V.R.O." (Instrumental) – 1:01 (J. S. Bach)
9. "I Like Rock" – 2:10
10. "Let the Computer Decide" – 3:59
11. "Girl Crazy" – 3:55 (Chip Z' Nuff/Donnie Vie)
12. "Girls Who Can Read Your Mind" (Demo version) – 4:12
13. "Girls Watching" – 3:44
14. "Million Dollar Smile" (Live version) – 2:17
15. "Karn Evil 9" (Live version) – 5:05 (Keith Emerson/Greg Lake/Peter Sinfield)
16. "Gilberto Concerto" (Instrumental) – 7:48 (J. C. Bach)
17. "The Second Loudest Guitar In the World" – 3:16
- Track 2 originally recorded by Carole King on the album Tapestry.
- Track 15 originally recorded by Emerson, Lake & Palmer on the album Brain Salad Surgery.
- Tracks 8 & 16 arranged by Paul Gilbert.

== Notes ==
- Tracks 1, 2, 5, 12 & 17 were previously unreleased.
