= Tony Spinner =

American musician

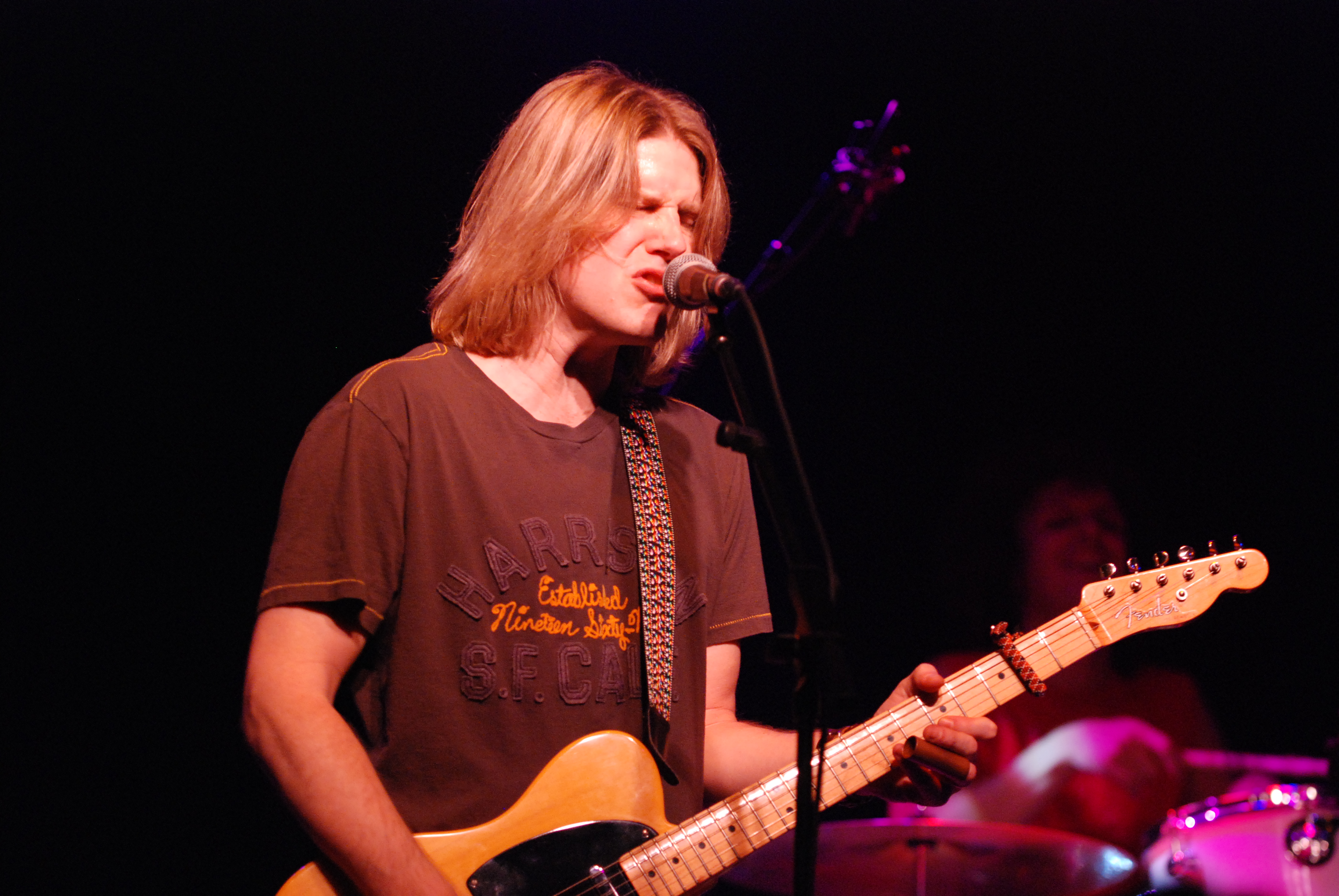
- Tony Spinner, playing in Zoetermeer, the Netherlands 2007; Photo: Jan Slob

Background information
- Born: Anthony Louis Spinner; June 9, 1963 (age 63); Cape Girardeau, Missouri, U.S.
- Genres: Blues rock, pop rock, hard rock
- Occupation: Musician
- Instruments: Vocals, guitar
- Years active: 1977–present
- Formerly of: Toto
- Spouse: Sonya Winningham (m. 1988)

Anthony Louis Spinner (born June 9, 1963) is an American rock and blues singer and guitarist, best known for his collaborations with Toto and Paul Gilbert. Spinner, who toured with Toto from 1999 until their temporary hiatus in 2008, was personally selected by David Paich as a backing vocalist and backup guitarist and would perform lead vocals on the song "Stop Loving You," originally performed by former Toto member Joseph Williams. When Toto reformed in 2010, Williams rejoined the band.

In fall 2010, Tony Spinner joined Paul Gilbert on his "Fuzz Universe" European tour.

== Tony Spinner discography ==
1993: Saturn Blues - (solo)
1993: Various Artists – L.A. Blues Authority: Hats off to Stevie Ray (L.A. Blues Authority Volume III) - "Empty Arms"
1993: Various Artists – L.A. Blues Authority: Fit For A. King (L.A. Blues Authority Volume IV) - "Down Don't Bother Me"
1994: Various Artists – Songs from the Better Blues Bureau - "Angeline"
1994: My. '64 - (solo)
1995: Let It Be Known - Mark Sallings & Famous Unknowns
1996: Crosstown Sessions - (solo)
1997: Talkin' to Myself - Mark Sallings & Famous Unknowns
1998: Flying Dog - (Paul Gilbert)
1999: Livefields - (Toto)
2000: Alligator Farm - (Paul Gilbert)
2003: Various Artists – Voodoo Crossing: A Tribute to Jimi Hendrix - "Up From The Skies"
2003: Live in Amsterdam - (Toto)
2004: Chicks And Guitars - (solo)
2007: Falling in Between Live - (Toto)
2008: Live in Europe - (solo)
2009: Rollin´and Tumblin' - (solo)
2010: Fuzz Universe - (Paul Gilbert)
2011: Rare Tracks - (solo)
2011: Down Home Mojo - (solo)
2012: Vibrato - (Paul Gilbert)
2013: Earth Music for Aliens - (solo)
2016: I Can Destroy - (Paul Gilbert)
2019: Welcome to the Zoom Club (A Tribute to Budgie) - (Bandolier Kings)
2020: Love is the Answer - (solo)
2022: Official Live Bootleg - (solo)
2022: Time To Remember (A Tribute to Budgie - Volume 2) - (Bandolier Kings)
