= Kidoairaku Plus Ai =

"Kidoairaku plus ai"

Single by Kaela Kimura
- Released: August 3, 2011
- Genre: J-pop
- Label: Nippon Columbia
- Songwriters: Kaela Kimura, Shinobu Watanabe

Kaela Kimura singles chronology
"A Winter Fairy Is Melting a Snowman" (2010)	"Kidoairaku plus ai" (2011)	"Mamillel" (2012)

"Kidoairaku Plus Ai" (喜怒哀楽 plus 愛, Emotions plus Love) is the 17th single from Japanese pop singer Kaela Kimura.

== Track listing ==
All lyrics are written by Kaela Kimura; all music is composed by Shinobu Watanabe.

CD
No.	Title	Length
1.	""Kidoairaku Plus Ai" (喜怒哀楽 plus 愛, Emotions plus Love)"	3:38
2.	""Hoshi no Tane" (ホシノタネ, Species of Star)"	3:40
3.	""Kidoairaku Plus Ai"" (instrumental)	3:38
4.	""Hoshi no Tane"" (instrumental)	3:38
