= Sola Gratia (album) =

Studio album by Neal Morse
- Released: September 11, 2020
- Recorded: April 2020
- Genre: Progressive rock, Progressive Metal
- Length: 65:41
- Label: Inside Out

Neal Morse chronology
Jesus Christ the Exorcist (2019)	Sola Gratia (2020)

Sola Gratia (Latin for "grace alone") is the eleventh studio album by American progressive rock vocalist, keyboardist and guitarist Neal Morse, released on September 11, 2020. It marks his return to Inside Out Music.

Recorded in April 2020, it is a concept album about Paul the Apostle, focusing on the period from his persecution of early Christians to his conversion.

The album was released as a limited CD/DVD Digipak (with Making-of video footage), a Gatefold double LP and CD, a standard CD jewel case and on digital platforms. It was debuted live during his annual MorseFest event in September 2020.

Three singles were released from the album, each of them with an accompanying video: "In the Name of the Lord", "Seemingly Sincere" (dealing with the stoning of Saint Stephen; video directed by Christian Rios of Ray of Light Films) and "Building a Wall".

== Background and recording ==
Morse started to write the album during some time off in New Zealand after touring in Australia, and the idea of writing something about Paul the Apostle had been suggested by several people in the past.

According to Morse, the title of the album was inadvertently suggested by his wife. She said he should do a new "solo" album, but he heard "sola" album. Morse then saw some connections between this album and Sola Scriptura, due to both dealing with themes of persecution, and decided to name it Sola Gratia.

Although all the Neal Morse Band members perform on the album, Morse chose to release it as a solo effort instead because he wrote and recorded most of the material alone, while albums released with the band are usually created in a more collaborative manner. Most instruments not played by Morse were recorded remotely, a first for him and his band, except for the strings and choirs, which were done in loco.

== Track listing ==
All tracks are written by Neal Morse

Sola Gratia track listing
No.	Title	Length
1.	"Preface"	1:26
2.	"Overture"	5:59
3.	"In the Name of the Lord"	4:27
4.	"Ballyhoo (The Chosen ones)"	2:43
5.	"March of the Pharisees"	1:40
6.	"Building a Wall"	5:01
7.	"Sola Intermezzo"	2:10
8.	"Overflow"	6:27
9.	"Warmer Than the Sunshine"	3:22
10.	"Never Change"	7:52
11.	"Seemingly Sincere"	9:34
12.	"The Light on the Road to Damascus"	3:26
13.	"The Glory of the Lord"	6:17
14.	"Now I Can See / The Great Commission"	5:17
Total length:		65:41

== Reception ==
=== Critical reception ===
Professional ratings
Review scores
Source	Rating
Dangerdog Music Reviews	4.5/5
Sea of Tranquility	4/5 stars
Sonic Perspectves	8.6/10

Dangerdog's Craig Hartranft called Sola Gratia "simply signature Neal Morse, offering delightfully intricate and creative melodic progressive rock" and said it is "another compelling and entertaining album of his signature melodic progressive rock."

Pete Pardo from Sea of Tranquility pointed that the album "is littered with his trademark catchy vocal harmonies, a never ending supply of complex & symphonic musical passages, and an overall sense of bombast" and said it's not hard to appreciate it "whether you subscribe to the concepts that Morse leans towards or not".

Scott Medina from Sonic Perspectives concluded that the album's strengths "lay in its top shelf performances from George, Portnoy and Morse, a healthy dose of quality material, and of course its pristine production thanks once again to Rich Mouser". However, he wasn't sure the album could top the Neal Morse Band albums, saying "Ultimately, this album can sit comfortably alongside the aforementioned ? and [Sola] Scriptura, but it is up to the listener whether or not Gratia matches the heights of those albums."

=== Commercial reception ===
==== Charts ====
Chart (2020)	Peak position
Austrian Albums (Ö3 Austria)	68
Belgian Albums (Ultratop Wallonia)	142
Dutch Albums (Album Top 100)	70
German Albums (Offizielle Top 100)	19
Swiss Albums (Schweizer Hitparade)	19

== Personnel ==
Musicians

- Neal Morse — keyboards, guitars, vocals, percussions, drums on "Building a Wall"
- Mike Portnoy — drums (except "Building a Wall"), mow on "Building a Wall"
- Randy George — bass
- Eric Gillette — guitars on "Overture" and "In the Name of the Lord", solo on "The Glory of the Lord"
- Bill Hubauer — piano and a-ha moment
- Gideon Klein — cello, viola, string bass
- Joose Weigand — violin, viola
- Wil Morse, Debbie Bresee, April Zachary, Julie Harrison, Amy Pippin — background vocals

Technical

- Neal Morse — production
- Gabe Klein — strings recording
- Thomas Cucé — drums engineering
- Rich Mouser – mixing
- Thomas Ewerhard — artwork
