= WTRO =

WTRO may refer to

- WTRO (AM), a radio station (1450 AM) licensed to Dyersburg, Tennessee, United States
- W.T.R.O., song by Paul Gilbert
- World Trade Organization
