= Stone Pushing Uphill Man =

Studio album by Paul Gilbert
- Released: 25 June 2014 (Japan); 5 August 2014
- Genres: Rock, instrumental rock
- Length: 42:24
- Label: Shrapnel Records
- Producer: Paul Gilbert

Paul Gilbert chronology
Vibrato (2012)	Stone Pushing Uphill Man (2014)

Stone Pushing Uphill Man is the 13th studio album by Paul Gilbert, released on August 5, 2014. The album features instrumental covers of songs by Aerosmith, James Brown, and more.

== Track listing ==
No.	Title	Writer(s)	Length
1.	"Working for the Weekend"	Paul Dean, Mike Reno, Matt Frenette	3:43
2.	"Back in the Saddle"	Joe Perry, Steven Victor Tallarico	4:42
3.	"I Got the Feelin'"	James Brown	2:09
4.	"Goodbye Yellow Brick Road"	Elton John, Bernie Taupin	4:54
5.	"Why Don't We Do It in the Road?"	John Lennon, Paul McCartney	1:44
6.	"Shock Absorber"	Paul Gilbert	5:12
7.	"Purple Without All the Red"	Paul Gilbert	2:02
8.	"Murder by Numbers"	Sting, Andy Summers	4:36
9.	"My Girl"	Eric Carmen	4:39
10.	"Wash Me Clean"	k.d. lang	3:20
11.	"Stone Pushing Uphill Man"	Paul Gilbert	5:23
Total length:			42:24

== Personnel ==
- Paul Gilbert – guitar, bass, bongos, composer, engineer, producer, vocals
- Kenny Aronoff – drums
- Mike Portnoy - drums (tracks 1, 5)
- Chase Bryant - bass (acoustic)
- Kris Persson - percussion
- Rick Estrin - dialogue (Track 6)
- Sisyphus - Stone pusher

=== Production ===
- Jerry Guidroz - engineer
- James Ingram - mixing
- Paul Logus - mastering
- Philip Naslund - engineer, producer
- Jay Ruston - mixing
- Nathan Elliot Staley - engineer
- Ben Dewey - illustrations
- Jeannie Deva - vocal harmony
- Brad Bond - sleeve design
