= The Dio Album =

Studio album by Paul Gilbert
- Released: 7 April 2023
- Genre: Instrumental rock, hard rock, heavy metal
- Length: 57:13
- Label: Mascot
- Producer: Paul Gilbert

Paul Gilbert chronology
| 'TWAS (2021) | The Dio Album (2023) |

Singles from The Dio Album
- 1. "Holy Diver" Released: 1 February 2023

Professional ratings
Review scores
| Source | Rating |
|---|---|
| Classic Rock | 2/5 stars |
| Sonic Perspectives | 8/10 stars |

The Dio Album is the eighteenth studio album by American guitarist Paul Gilbert, released on 7 April 2023. A tribute to the late Ronnie James Dio, the album consists of instrumental covers of various Rainbow, Black Sabbath, and Dio songs.

== Track listing ==
| No. | Title | Writer(s) | Length |
|---|---|---|---|
| 1. | "Neon Knights" | Tony Iommi, Ronnie James Dio, Geezer Butler, Bill Ward | 4:44 |
| 2. | "Kill the King" | Ritchie Blackmore, Dio, Cozy Powell | 4:52 |
| 3. | "Stand Up and Shout" | Dio, Jimmy Bain | 3:19 |
| 4. | "Country Girl" | Iommi, Dio, Butler | 4:00 |
| 5. | "Man on the Silver Mountain" | Blackmore, Dio | 4:20 |
| 6. | "Holy Diver" | Dio | 5:18 |
| 7. | "Heaven and Hell" | Iommi, Dio, Butler, Ward | 6:27 |
| 8. | "Long Live Rock 'n' Roll" | Blackmore, Dio | 4:27 |
| 9. | "Lady Evil" | Iommi, Dio, Butler, Ward | 4:28 |
| 10. | "Don't Talk to Strangers" | Dio | 5:08 |
| 11. | "Starstruck" | Blackmore, Dio | 4:11 |
| 12. | "The Last in Line" | Dio, Bain, Vivian Campbell | 5:59 |
| Total length: | | | 57:13 |

Japanese Edition Bonus Track
| No. | Title | Writer(s) | Length |
|---|---|---|---|
| 13. | "Love Is All" | Roger Glover, Eddie Hardin, Dio | 3:37 |

== Personnel ==
- Paul Gilbert – lead, rhythm, slide, and acoustic guitars, bass guitar, production
- Bill Ray - drums

=== Production ===
- Zach Bloomstein – mixing, engineering
- Jeff Lipton – mastering
- Maria Rice – mastering
- Brad Bond – cover artwork
