= Silence Followed by a Deafening Roar =

Studio album by Paul Gilbert
- Released: 23 January 2008 (Japan); 8 April 2008 (Canada) & (USA)
- Recorded: 2007
- Genre: Instrumental rock
- Length: 42:19
- Label: Shrapnel
- Producer: Paul Gilbert

Paul Gilbert chronology
Get Out of My Yard (2006)	Silence Followed by a Deafening Roar (2008)	United States (2009)

Silence Followed by a Deafening Roar is the second full length instrumental album and 8th overall by hard rock guitarist Paul Gilbert.

Professional ratings
Review scores
Source	Rating
Allmusic	3.5/5 stars

== Track listing ==
No.	Title	Writer(s)	Length
1.	"Silence Followed by a Deafening Roar"	Paul Gilbert	3:48
2.	"Eudaimonia Overture"	Gilbert, J.S. Bach	4:35
3.	"The Rhino"	Gilbert	2:46
4.	"Norwegian Cowbell"	Gilbert	4:06
5.	"I Cannot Tell a Lie"	Gilbert	3:50
6.	"Bronx 1971"	Gilbert	4:04
7.	"Suite Modale"	Ernest Bloch	2:38
8.	"The Gargoyle"	Gilbert	4:35
9.	"I Still Have That Other Girl"	Elvis Costello, Burt Bacharach	2:52
10.	"Bultaco Saturno"	Gilbert	4:13
11.	"Paul Vs. Godzilla"	Gilbert	4:52
Total length:			42:19

Track 2 ends with a complete performance of Bach's Prelude in G major from the Well-Tempered Clavier Book 1.

== Personnel ==
- Paul Gilbert – guitar, production
- Mike Szuter – bass
- Jeff Bowders – drums
- Emi Gilbert – Hammond B3, piano

=== Production ===
- Pat Sullivan – mastering
- Stan Katayama – engineer, mixing
- June Murakawa – engineer
