= Get Out of My Yard =

Studio album by Paul Gilbert
- Released: July 26, 2006 (Japan)
- Genre: Instrumental rock
- Length: 54:04
- Label: Shrapnel
- Producer: Paul Gilbert, Tom Size

Paul Gilbert chronology
Space Ship One (2005)	Get Out of My Yard (2006)	Silence Followed by a Deafening Roar (2008)

Professional ratings
Review scores
Source	Rating
Allmusic	3.5/5 stars

Get Out of My Yard (GOOMY) is the eighth solo and first entirely instrumental studio album by American guitarist Paul Gilbert.

== Track listing ==
All songs written by Paul Gilbert, except where noted.

No.	Title	Writer(s)	Length
1.	"Get Out of My Yard"	Paul Gilbert	1:38
2.	"Hurry Up"	Gilbert	5:11
3.	"The Curse of Castle Dragon"	Gilbert	3:51
4.	"Radiator"	Gilbert	4:51
5.	"Straight Through the Telephone Pole"	Gilbert	4:01
6.	"Marine Layer"	Gilbert	2:57
7.	"Twelve Twelve"	Gilbert	4:03
8.	"Rusty Old Boat"	Gilbert	4:04
9.	"The Echo Song"	Gilbert	5:08
10.	"Full Tank"	Gilbert	5:19
11.	"My Teeth Are a Drumset"	Gilbert	3:38
12.	"Haydn Symphony No.88 Finale"	Joseph Haydn	3:37
13.	"Three E's for Edward"	Gilbert	2:19
14.	"You Kids"	Gilbert	3:27
15.	"Hurry Up (Studio Live Version) [Japan Bonus Track]"	Gilbert	5:23
Total length:			54:04

== Personnel ==
- Paul Gilbert – electric & acoustic guitars, bass, vocals
- Mike Szuter – bass on tracks 8, 10, and 11
- Jeff Bowders – drums
- Emi Gilbert – piano on track 6, Hammond organ on track 8, classical consultation on track 12
