= United States (album) =

Studio album by Paul Gilbert
- Released: October 22, 2008 (Japan) April 20, 2009 (Europe) April 28, 2009 (Canada & US)
- Recorded: 2008
- Genre: Hard rock
- Length: 37:46
- Label: Mascot Records
- Producer: Paul Gilbert, Freddie Nelson

Paul Gilbert chronology
Silence Followed by a Deafening Roar (2008)	United States (2008)	Fuzz Universe (2010)

Paul Gilbert collaborative chronology
Raw Blues Power (2002)	United States (2009)

Professional ratings
Review scores
Source	Rating
Allmusic	3.5/5 stars

United States is a collaborative album between hard rock guitarist Paul Gilbert and singer Freddie Nelson.

== Track listing ==
1. "The Last Rock and Roll Star" – 4:05
2. "Hideaway" – 4:41
3. "Waste of Time" – 3:22
4. "Bad Times Good" – 3:39
5. "Paris Hilton Look-Alike" – 4:02
6. "The Answer" – 3:03
7. "I'm Free" – 4:19
8. "Pulsar" – 4:27
9. "Girl from Omaha" – 3:15
10. "I'm Not Addicted" – 3:01

== Personnel ==
- Paul Gilbert – guitar, bass, vocals
- Freddie Nelson – vocals, guitar
- Stephen Barber – string arrangements
- Stan Katayama – drum engineering, mixing
- Jun Murakawa – drum engineering
- Mark Chalecki – mastering
