= Hocus Pocus (Kaela Kimura album) =

- Limited edition cover

Studio album by Kaela Kimura
- Released: June 24, 2009
- Recorded: 2008
- Genre: J-pop
- Length: 52:54
- Label: Nippon Columbia

Kaela Kimura chronology
+1 (2008)	Hocus Pocus (2009)	5 Years (2010)

Alternative Cover
- Normal edition cover

Singles from Hocus Pocus
- 1. "Moustache/Memories" Released: September 10, 2008; 2. "Doko" Released: January 28, 2009; 3. "Banzai" Released: May 8, 2009; 4. "Butterfly" Released: June 1, 2009

Hocus Pocus (stylized as HOCUS POCUS) is the fifth album by Japanese pop singer Kaela Kimura, released on June 24, 2009. The album was released in formats CD and DVD.

== Background & composition ==
In an interview with Barks.jp, Kimura explained that the lyrics of the album were focused on the real world, with "Butterfly" were she talks about marriage. It's title is described as "something like a magic spell" and says she embedded the message that "people can reinvent themselves as much as they want through their own power."

== Singles & promotion ==
Four singles were released, Including “Mustache,” “Doko,” and “Banzai” as well as it's B-sides “Phone” and “Hocus Pocus.”

The DVD included with the first-press limited edition features music videos for each single, as well as behind-the-scenes footage from the “BANZAI” music video shoot.

"Butterfly" would later be performed at the 60th NHK Kōhaku Uta Gassen, making it her first appearance.

== Commercial performance ==
The album charted at number 3 on Oricon and stayed for 34 weeks, later being certified Platinum by the RIAJ. It would chart at number 37 on the Year-end charts.

== Track listing ==
All lyrics are written by Kaela Kimura, except where noted.

Disc 1: CD
No.	Title	Lyrics	Music	Arranger(s)	Length
1.	"Dear Jazzmaster '84"	Shinobu Watanabe, 4106 (Braziliansize)	4106 (Braziliansize)		4:22
2.	"Moustache" (album ver.)		AxSxE		3:50
3.	"Phone"	Shinobu Watanabe	Shinobu Watanabe		3:28
4.	"Otome Echo (乙女echo, Virgin echo)"		Isamu Fujita (Mo'some Tonebender)		3:02
5.	"Butterfly"		Atsushi Suemitsu (Suemitsu & the Suemith)		4:14
6.	"Doko (どこ, Where)"	Shinobu Watanabe	Shinobu Watanabe	Strings arranged by: Yu Manabe	4:03
7.	"Hocus Pocus"		Mito (Clammbon)	Kentaro Takahashi	3:51
8.	"Another World"		Shigekazu Aida	Keyboard arrangement: Keisaku Nakamura	4:44
9.	"Season"		AxSxE		3:52
10.	"Kimi ni Aitai (キミニアイタイ, I want to meet you)"		Kazuhide Takamoto (Comeback My Daughters)		3:39
11.	"Jeepney"		Kyōgo Nishii (Stan)	Keyboard arrangement: Keisaku Nakamura	3:30
12.	"Banzai" (Album Ver.)		Taro Kobata (Avengers in Sci-Fi)	Avengers in Sci-Fi	5:33
13.	"Super Girl"		Kōichi Tsutaya		4:20
14.	"Untitled Track 14/ Today" (Secret track)		4106

Disc 2: DVD (Limited edition only)
No.	Title	Length
1.	"Moustache" (Music video)
2.	"memories (original version)" (Music video)
3.	"Doko" (Music video)
4.	"Banzai" (Music video)
5.	"tvk "saku saku" MC revival week [edited version]"
6.	"Banzai" (Music video in the making)

== Charts ==
Chart performance for Hocus Pocus
Chart (2009)	Peak position
Japanese Albums (Oricon)	3

Year-end chart performance for Hocus Pocus
Chart (2009)	Position
Japanese Albums (Oricon)	37

== Certifications ==
Certifications and sales for Hocus Pocus
Region	Certification	Certified units/sales
Japan (RIAJ)	Platinum	250,000

== Release history ==
Date	Edition(s)	Formats	Label	Ref.
June 24, 2009	Standard	CD, DVD	Nippon Columbia	
June 25, 2012	Standard	Digital Download	Nippon Columbia	

== Personnel ==
Credits adapted from CD Booklet:

- Kaela Kimura – Vocals, Guitar (Track 2)
- Shinobu Watanabe – Guitar (Tracks 1, 3, 6), Backing Vocals (Track 1)
- 4106: Bass (#1, 3, 6)
- Takashi Kashiwakura: Drums (Tracks 1, 3, 5, 6, 9) Castanets & Tambourine (#5)
- Keisaku Nakamura: Bagpipes & Synthesizer (#1) Keyboards (#3, 8, 11) Piano (#6) Keyboard Arrangement (#8, 11)
- AxSxE: Guitar (Tracks 2, 9, 13), Bass (Track 9)
- Kentaro Nakao: Bass (Track 2)
- BOBO: Drums (Track 2)
- Eiko Ishibashi: Marimba (Tracks 2, 9), Glockenspiel (Track 2), Flute (Track 9)
- Isamu Fujita: Programming (Track 4)
- Yasunori Takei & Hashd Potato: Sampler (Track 4)
- Atsushi Suemitsu: Piano, Synthesizer, Tambourine (Track 5)
- Shunsuke Suzuki: Guitar (Track 5)
- Mito: Bass (Track 5)
- MC Kids: Chorus (Track 5)
- Yutaka Manabe: String Arrangement (Track 6)
- Yutaka Manabe Strings: Strings (Track 6)
- Shigeichi Aida: Guitar & Programming (Track 8)
- Takasada Inada: Tenor Sax (Track 9)
- Yuichiro Kato: Alto Sax (Track 9)
- Kenji Kakizawa: Trumpet & Flugelhorn (Track 9)
- Kazuhide Takamoto: Guitar & Keyboards (Track 10)
- Atsushi Hieda: Bass (Track 10)
- Goro Nakatsugawa: Drums (Track 10)
- tasuku: Support (Track 10)
- Sumitaka Koseki: Drum Tuning (Track 10)
- Kyogo Nishii: Guitar (Track 11)
- Koji Nakajima: Bass (Track 11)
- Kiyoshi Yoshida: Drums (Track 11)
- Daisuke Ito: Drum Tuning (Track 11)
- Taro Kibata: Guitar & Synthesizer (Track 12)
- Yoshihiko Inami: Bass & Synthesizer (Track 12)
- Masanori Hasegawa: Drums (Track 12)
- Yoshikazu Tsutaya: Programming, All Other Instruments & Chorus (Track 13)
- Masafumi Yamamoto: Bass (Track 13)
- Hiroshi “Matsukichi” Matsubara: Drums (Track 13)
