= Vibrato (album) =

Studio album by Paul Gilbert
- Released: 19 September 2012 (Japan); 15 October 2012
- Genre: Rock, blues rock, instrumental rock
- Length: 67:31
- Label: Music Theories Recordings; Shrapnel Records
- Producer: Paul Gilbert

Paul Gilbert chronology
Fuzz Universe (2010)	Vibrato (2012)	Stone Pushing Uphill Man (2014)

Vibrato is the 12th studio album by Paul Gilbert, released on October 15, 2012. The album is half instrumental.

== Track listing ==
No.	Title	Writer(s)	Length
1.	"Enemies (In Jail)"	Paul Gilbert	6:03
2.	"Rain and Thunder and Lightning"	Gilbert	5:04
3.	"Vibrato"	Gilbert	3:29
4.	"Put It on the Char"	Gilbert	5:33
5.	"Bivalve Blues"	Gilbert	7:43
6.	"Blue Rondo à la Turk (Cover)"	Dave Brubeck	5:38
7.	"Atmosphere on the Moon"	Gilbert	5:14
8.	"The Pronghorn"	Gilbert	5:36
9.	"Roundabout (Cover) [Live]"	Steve Howe, Jon Anderson	9:08
10.	"I Want to Be Loved (Cover) [Live]"	Willie Dixon	6:10
11.	"Go Down (Cover) [Live]"	Bon Scott, Malcolm Young	7:57
Total length:			67:39

== Personnel ==
- Paul Gilbert – lead guitar, vocals
- Jeff Bowders – drums
- Emi Gilbert – keyboards
- Thomas Lang – drums
- Kelly LeMieux – bass guitar
- Craig Martini – bass guitar
- Tony Spinner – rhythm guitar, vocals

=== Production ===
- John Greenberg - management
- Tim Heyne - management
- Ace Baker – engineering
- Dave Brubeck – songwriting
- Willie Dixon – songwriting
- Howe – songwriting
- Paul Logus – mastering
- Jun Murakawa – engineering
- Jay Ruston – mixing album
- James Chiang - photography and images album
