= Yellow Matter Custard =

Beatles tribute band

- Genres: Rock
- Years active: 2003, 2011
- Past members: Matt Bissonette; Paul Gilbert; Neal Morse; Mike Portnoy; Kasim Sulton

Yellow Matter Custard was a Beatles tribute supergroup consisting of Mike Portnoy, Neal Morse, Paul Gilbert and Matt Bissonette. Kasim Sulton played bass with the band in 2011, replacing Bissonette.

They take their name from a line in "I Am the Walrus", by the Beatles: "Yellow matter custard, dripping from a dead dog's eye".

Ty Tabor (King's X) was originally approached to play guitar for the group, but was unable to due to the King's X touring schedule.

Conceived as more of a project than a band, they have only performed a total of five times: twice in 2003 (May 17 at Upper Montclair, New Jersey and May 18 at B.B. King's Blues Club, New York), and three times in 2011. Due to scheduling conflicts, Matt Bissonette was unable to play with the band in 2011, and thus was replaced by Kasim Sulton.

== Members ==
Former members

- Mike Portnoy - drums, vocals
- Neal Morse - keyboards, guitars, fuzz bass, vocals
- Paul Gilbert - lead guitars, vocals, harmonica
- Matt Bissonette - bass, vocals (2003)
- Kasim Sulton - bass, vocals (2011)

Additional players

- Bert Baldwin - keyboards, percussion, samples

== Discography ==
=== One Night in New York City ===
- Two CD/DVD
- Recorded May 18, 2003
- CD released 2003
- DVD released 2005
1. "Magical Mystery Tour"
2. "Dear Prudence"
3. "Dig a Pony"
4. "She Said She Said"
5. "I Call Your Name"
6. "You Can't Do That"
7. "When I Get Home"
8. "Nowhere Man"
9. "Rain"
10. "Free as a Bird"
11. "Come Together"
12. "I Am the Walrus"
13. "While My Guitar Gently Weeps"
14. "Baby's in Black"
15. "I'll Be Back"
16. "No Reply"
17. "The Night Before"
18. "You're Gonna Lose That Girl"
19. "Ticket to Ride"
20. "Everybody's Got Something to Hide Except Me and My Monkey"
21. "Oh! Darling"
22. "Think For Yourself"
23. "Wait"
24. "Revolution"
25. "I Want You (She's So Heavy)"
26. "You Know My Name (Look Up the Number)"
27. "Lovely Rita"
28. "Good Morning Good Morning"
29. "Sgt. Pepper's Lonely Hearts Club Band" (reprise)
30. "A Day in the Life"

==== DVD bonus features ====
- Yellow Matter Custard Rehearsals
- Pre-Show Backstage

=== One More Night in New York City ===
- Recorded: February 28, 2011
- Two CD/DVD released 2011
1. "Back in the USSR"
2. "I Got a Feeling"
3. "And Your Bird Can Sing"
4. "Day Tripper"
5. "Getting Better"
6. "Taxman"
7. "It Won't Be Long"
8. "You've Really Got a Hold on Me"
9. "Lady Madonna"
10. "We Can Work It Out"
11. "I'm a Loser"
12. "I Don't Want To Spoil the Party"
13. "Penny Lane"
14. "The Fool on the Hill"
15. "You've Got to Hide Your Love Away"
16. "Things We Said Today"
17. "If I Needed Someone"
18. "It's Only Love"
19. "She's a Woman"
20. "The Word"
21. "Any Time at All"
22. "Paperback Writer"
23. "Don't Let Me Down"
24. "I'm So Tired"
25. "Savoy Truffle"
26. "Glass Onion"
27. "Yer Blues"
28. "Helter Skelter"
29. "Flying"
30. "Because"
31. "You Never Give Me Your Money"
32. "Sun King"
33. "Mean Mr. Mustard"
34. "Her Majesty"
35. "Polythene Pam"
36. "She Came In Through the Bathroom Window"
37. "Golden Slumbers"
38. "Carry That Weight"
39. "The End"

==== DVD bonus features ====
- Interview with Mike Portnoy & Paul Gilbert (25:23)
- Rehearsal footage (38:16)
