= Fuzz Universe =

Studio album by Paul Gilbert
- Released: 30 June 2010 (Japan); 3 August 2010
- Genre: Instrumental rock
- Length: 57:21
- Label: Shrapnel
- Producer: Paul Gilbert

Paul Gilbert chronology
United States (2009)	Fuzz Universe (2010)	Vibrato (2012)

Professional ratings
Review scores
Source	Rating
AllMusic	3.5/5 stars
Metal Express Radio	(9/10)

Fuzz Universe is the third full length instrumental album and 9th overall by hard rock guitar virtuoso Paul Gilbert.

== Track listing ==
All songs written by Paul Gilbert except where noted:

No.	Title	Writer(s)	Length
1.	"Fuzz Universe"	Paul Gilbert	7:03
2.	"Olympic"	Gilbert	5:57
3.	"The Count Juan Chutrifo"	Gilbert	3:08
4.	"Bach Partita in Dm"	J.S. Bach	3:26
5.	"Blue Orpheus"	Todd Rundgren	5:07
6.	"Will My Screen Door Stop Neptune"	Gilbert	4:17
7.	"Propeller"	Gilbert	4:47
8.	"Don't Rain On My Firewood"	Gilbert	4:39
9.	"Plastic Dracula"	Gilbert	4:50
10.	"Blowtorch"	Gilbert	5:40
11.	"Mantra the Lawn"	Gilbert	5:34
12.	"Batter Up"	Gilbert	2:53
13.	"Leave That Junk Alone (Japan Bonus Track)"	Johnny Cash	1:37
Total length:			57:21

== Notes ==
- Track 4 originally by J.S. Bach
- Track 5 originally recorded by Todd Rundgren on the album A Cappella (1985)

== Personnel ==
- Paul Gilbert – guitar, vocals
- Tony Spinner – guitar, vocals
- Craig Martini – bass
- Jeff Bowders – drums
- Emi Gilbert · keyboards
- Cover art by Alejandro Chavetta and James Chiang
