= Dynamo (Avengers in Sci-Fi album) =

Studio album by Avengers in Sci-Fi
- Released: October 13, 2010
- Recorded: 2010
- Genre: Electronic rock, new wave, experimental rock, techno
- Length: 50:13
- Label: Victor

Avengers in Sci-Fi chronology
Crazy Gonna Spacey (2010)	Dynamo (2010)

Singles from Dynamo
- 1. "Delight Slight Lightspeed" Released: September 8, 2010

Dynamo (stylised as dynamo) is Japanese electro-rock band Avengers in Sci-Fi's third studio album, and first under a major record label. It was released on October 13, 2010, as an exclusive download on iTunes simultaneously with their live album Crazy Gonna Spacey, with the album's wide release on the 20th.

== Promotion ==
The album was led by a preceding single, "Delight Slight Lightspeed," in September. It was released as a two track single, along with a seven track DVD, featuring highlights from the band's Crazy Gonna Spacy Tour at Ebisu Liquidroom (April 3, 2010). "Delight Slight Lightspeed" was later chosen as the commercial song for Cedar Crest in October.

In the initial album press release, it was described as "a speed-of-light story of 13 songs, two lives swimming over 1,000 light years interweaving, and spinning truth and love from the universe."

"Wonderpower" was used as the lead track from the album, and received a music video, directed by Takayuki Kojima. The song, along with "Delight Slight Lightspeed" were the album tracks from the album performed at concerts before the album's release.

The band will promote the album with their Delight Slight Flight Tour, a 28 date Japan tour starting on the 13th of November and finishing on February the 19th.

== Track listing ==
All lyrics written by Tarō Kohata, all music written and songs performed by Avengers in Sci-Fi.

No.	Title	Length
1.	"El Planeta/Love"	0:45
2.	"Wonderpower"	3:29
3.	"Cydonia Twin"	4:02
4.	"Intergalactic Love Song"	5:57
5.	"Delight Slight Lightspeed (Dynamo Version)"	4:06
6.	"Before the Stardust Fades"	4:32
7.	"There He Goes"	4:11
8.	"Lovers on Mars"	3:42
9.	"Where Stars Sleep"	1:12
10.	"Caravan"	4:09
11.	"Future Never Knows"	4:59
12.	"Space Station Styx"	8:38
13.	"El Planeta/Birth"	0:31
Total length:		50:13

== Charts and sales ==
"Wonderpower"
A sample from the leading track, "Wonderpower."

"Delight Slight Lightspeed (Dynamo Version)"
A sample from the album version of the single track "Delight Slight Lightspeed."

"Space Station Styx"
A sample from the closing track, "Space Station Styx."

Chart (2010)	Peak position
Oricon daily albums	29
Oricon weekly albums	60

=== Reported sales ===
Chart	Amount
Oricon physical sales	3,100

== Release history ==
Region	Date	Format
Japan	October 13, 2010	PC download (iTunes exclusive)
Japan	October 20, 2010	CD
Japan	November 6, 2010	Rental CD
