= Butterfly (Kaela Kimura song) =

Single by Kaela Kimura

from the album Hocus Pocus
- Released: June 1, 2009
- Genre: J-pop
- Length: 4:16
- Label: Columbia Music Entertainment
- Songwriters: Kaela Kimura, Atsushi Suemitsu

Kaela Kimura singles chronology
"Banzai" (2009)	"Butterfly" (2009)	"Hot Pepper no Uta" (2009)

"Butterfly" is a wedding song by Japanese musician Kaela Kimura, released as a digital single on June 1, 2009, roughly a month before her fifth album, Hocus Pocus. It was extremely successful, reaching downloads of over 2,000,000 just over six months after its release. It is Kimura's most successful single digitally. Columbia released a special instrumental version of the song on February 14, 2010.

== Writing and inspiration ==
The song is a ballad, arranged with a harpsichord and piano backing. As the song progresses, a band arrangement with electric guitars and drums is introduced. Also present in the song are the sounds of church bells, a children's choir and a church organ. The lyrics describe a newly wed bride as a butterfly, who is "more wonderful today than any other time before" who "flaps white wings, together towards happiness." The verses deal with how the person writing the song met the wedding bride so long ago, and describes the wedding ceremony, and how happy the bride is.

Kaela Kimura wrote the song for a close friend, who wanted her to sing a song for her and her husband at their wedding. She wrote the song in collaboration with Akira Suemitsu (Suemitsu & the Suemith), who wrote the music. Kimura wrote the song's lyrics like a letter addressed to her friend, and performed the song at her friend's birthday on Valentine's Day in 2009.

== Promotion ==
The song was chosen as a commercial song for wedding information magazine Zexy, out of 200 potential other songs submitted to the company. The commercial began airing in mid April 2009, however it did not list the singer of the song initially. Kimura was first announced as the singer of the commercial to the press on 30 May 2009, when she performed the song as a surprise gift at the wedding reception of two Kaela Kimura fans, at Shinyokohama's International Hotel.

On December 31, 2009, Kimura performed the song at the annual New Year's Song contest, Kōhaku Uta Gassen.

== Music video ==
The music video was shot by director Takeshi Nakamura with help from company Nicographics. It features Kimura against a stylised outdoor background, in the style of a children's television show. As she walks along, a real butterfly flies around her, and she passes blue cut-outs of different animals, such as horses and rabbits. Kimura interacts with the animal representations and walks to a cut-out of a modern city. After she passes the city, she finds an A-frame log cabin, opens the door and a progression of pink animals come out of the door. The blue and pink animals find each other and fall in love.

== Commercial success ==
The song was extremely successful digitally. Within two months, the song had been downloaded over 1,000,000 times. At the end of 2009, it was the second most downloaded song of the year on iTunes in Japan, and the second most downloaded at Mora.jp

After Kimura sung the song at the annual New Year's Song contest, Kōhaku Uta Gassen, the song saw a great spike in sales. Before the performance, the song had been being downloaded roughly 1,500-2,000 times per day, which spiked to 40,000 times per day afterwards. Because of this, on 5 January, the song had been downloaded a total of 2,000,000 times. This also caused "Butterfly" to reach the #1 spot on the RIAJ Digital Track Chart for two weeks.

As of May 2010, the RIAJ had certified the song as being purchased more than 1,000,000 times on cellphones, and more than 500,000 times on PCs. The song has also been downloaded more than 1,000,000 times as a ringtone.

== Track listing ==
No.	Title	Lyrics	Music	Length
1.	"Butterfly"	Kaela Kimura	Atsushi Suemitsu

== Chart rankings ==
"Butterfly"
A sample of the song "Butterfly."

Weekly chart performance
Chart (2009)	Peak position
Billboard Japan Hot 100	8
RIAJ Digital Track Chart Top 100	2
Chart (2010)	Peak position
Billboard Japan Hot 100	27
RIAJ Digital Track Chart weekly top 100	1
RIAJ Digital Track Chart yearly top 100	2

Annual chart rankings
Chart (2010)	Rank
Japan Adult Contemporary (Billboard Japan)	16

=== Certifications ===
Chart	Amount
RIAJ ringtones	Million (1,000,000)
RIAJ full-length cellphone downloads	Million (1,000,000)
RIAJ PC Downloads	Double platinum (500,000)
RIAJ streaming	Gold (50,000,000)
