= Raw Blues Power =

Studio album by Paul Gilbert
- Released: March 12, 2002
- Recorded: July 2001
- Genre: Blues rock
- Length: 43:36
- Label: Blues Bureau International
- Producer: Paul Gilbert

Paul Gilbert chronology
Alligator Farm (2000)	Raw Blues Power (2002)	Burning Organ (2002)

Paul Gilbert Collaborative chronology
Raw Blues Power (2002)	United States (2009)

Professional ratings
Review scores
Source	Rating
AllMusic	3/5 stars

Raw Blues Power is a 2002 collaborative blues rock album by guitarist Paul Gilbert and his uncle Jimi Kidd.

== Track listing ==
No.	Title	Writer(s)	Length
1.	"Girls Watching"	Paul Gilbert, Jimi Kidd	3:46
2.	"A 180"	Jimi Kidd	3:41
3.	"Pacific Coast Highway"	Paul Gilbert	3:00
4.	"Good Foot"	Kidd	6:29
5.	"12 Days of the Blues"	Gilbert, Kidd	3:50
6.	"Freedom"	Kidd	3:54
7.	"Stranded"	Gilbert	3:30
8.	"Play Guitar"	Kidd	2:50
9.	"Sookie Sookie"	Don Covay	3:09
10.	"Blues Power"	Kidd	9:27
Total length:			43:36

== Musicians ==
- Paul Gilbert – guitar, vocals
- Jimi Kidd – guitar, vocals
- Jeff Martin – bongos, vocals
- Mike Szuter – bass guitar, vocals
- Johnny Fedevich – drums, vocals

=== Production ===
- Steve Hall – mastering
- Harry Freemantle – art direction
- Kate Gilbert – photography
