= Burning Organ =

Studio album by Paul Gilbert
- Released: June 26, 2002 (Japan); September 17, 2002 (United States)
- Genre: Hard rock
- Label: Shrapnel
- Producer: Paul Gilbert

Paul Gilbert chronology
Raw Blues Power (2002)	Burning Organ (2002)	Gilbert Hotel (2003)

Professional ratings
Review scores
Source	Rating
Allmusic	3/5 stars

Burning Organ, released in 2002, is the fifth studio album by American rock musician Paul Gilbert, also a guitarist for the heavy metal band Racer X and (then) formerly of the hard rock band Mr. Big.

The song "Keep on Keepin' On" has a short hidden track called "Maseito", a tribute to a Japanese DJ.

== Track listing ==
No.	Title	Writer(s)	Length
1.	"I Like Rock"	Paul Gilbert	2:09
2.	"My Religion"	Gilbert	3:20
3.	"Bliss"	Gilbert	5:10
4.	"Suicide Lover"	Gilbert, Linus of Hollywood	3:03
5.	"Friday Night (Say Yeah)"	Paul Gilbert	3:02
6.	"I Am Satan"	Gilbert, Linus of Hollywood	5:21
7.	"G.V.R.O. (instrumental)"	Traditional	1:01
8.	"My Drum"		4:23
9.	"Amy Is Amazing"	Gilbert	4:19
10.	"Muscle Car"	Gilbert	3:34
11.	"I Feel Love"	Pete Bellotte, Giorgio Moroder, Donna Summer	3:26
12.	"Burning Organ"	Gilbert	5:22
13.	"Keep on Keepin On"	Gilbert, Linus of Hollywood	4:38
Total length:			48:28

== Personnel ==
- Paul Gilbert – vocals and guitars
- David Richardson – piano and organ
- Mike Szuter – bass guitar and backing vocals
- Marco Minnemann – drums
- Linus of Hollywood – keyboards and backing vocals

== Production ==
- Mixing – Tom Size
- Engineer – Paul Gilbert and Linus of Hollywood
