= Avengers in Sci-Fi =

- Origin: Kanagawa, Japan
- Genres: Electronic rock; new wave; experimental rock; space rock; techno
- Years active: 2002–present
- Labels: K-Plan (2004—2008); Getting Better/Victor (2009—present)
- Members: Tarō Kohata (木幡太郎) (vocals, guitar, synthesiser); Yoshihiko Inami (稲見喜彦) (vocals, bass, synthesiser); Masanori Hasegawa (長谷川正法) (drums, chorus)
- Website: Avengers in Sci-Fi Official Site

Avengers in Sci-Fi (アヴェンジャーズ・イン・サイファイ, Avenjāzu in Saifai; stylised as avengers in sci-fi) is a Japanese rock band, signed to Victor Entertainment. Their multi-genre sound has been described as such things as "a spaceship of rock" and "spacey dance rock."

== Biography ==
The band members were all classmates at a high school in Kanagawa. They formed the band in 2002, debuting as an independent artist under K-Plan in 2004 with the extended play Science Rock, followed by their debut album Avenger Strikes Back in 2006.

In 2007, the band played at the rookie stage in the Fuji Rock summer festival, and toured with The Band Apart. In 2008, the band released their second album, Science Rock, and toured the United States as part of Japan Nite.

The band collaborated with Kaela Kimura, producing her 2009 single "Banzai." They also contributed to a Disney song cover compilation album, Disney Rocks!, covering "Mickey Mouse March." 2009 also saw tours with bands The Hiatus and Nothing's Carved in Stone, and for the band to release their first release with a major label, Victor Entertainment, with their second EP Jupiter Jupiter. The band were subsequently picked as one of the iTunes Japan "Sound of 2010" break-through artists.

In 2010, the band released their third album, Dynamo, led by the single "Delight Slight Lightspeed," which debuted at #20 on Oricon's daily singles charts.

== Discography ==
=== Original albums ===
Year	Album Information	Oricon Albums Charts	Reported sales
2006	Avenger Strikes Back: Released: August 9, 2006; Label: K-Plan (HKP-007); Formats: CD, digital download	290	700
2008	Science Rock: Released: November 5, 2008; Label: K-Plan (HKP-018); Formats: CD, digital download	74	3,900
2010	Dynamo: Released: October 13, 2010; Label: Victor (VICL-63678); Formats: CD, digital download	60	3,100
2012	Disc 4 the Seasons: Released: April 25, 2012; Label: Victor (VICL-63867); Formats: CD, digital download	54	3,200
2014	Unknown Tokyo Blues: Released: June 18, 2014; Label: Victor (VICL-64181); Formats: CD, digital download	-	-
2016	Dune: Released: April 20, 2016; Label: Victor (VICL-64565); Formats: CD, digital download	-	-

=== Compilation albums ===
Year	Album Information	Oricon Albums Charts	Reported sales
2013	Selected Ancient Works 2006-2013: Released: June 19, 2013; Label: Victor (VICL-64038～9); Formats: 2CD, digital download	—	—

=== Extended plays ===
Year	Album Information	Oricon Albums Charts	Reported sales
2004	Avengers in Sci-Fi: Released: December 15, 2004; Label: Bluegreen (BLGR-0001); Formats: CD, digital download	—	—
2009	Jupiter Jupiter: Released: December 2, 2009; Label: Getting Better (VICL-63479); Formats: CD, digital download	81	3,600

=== Live album ===
Year	Album Information
2010	Crazy Gonna Spacey: Released: October 13, 2010; Formats: Digital download

=== Singles ===
Release	Title	Notes	Chart positions		Oricon sales	Album
Release	Title	Notes	Oricon Singles Charts	Billboard Japan Hot 100	Oricon sales	Album
2010	"Delight Slight Lightspeed"		55	71	2,500	Dynamo
2011	"Sonic Fireworks"		71	25	1,600	Disc 4 the Seasons
2012	"Yang 2"	iTunes exclusive	—	—	—	Disc 4 the Seasons
