= Sola Scriptura (album) =

Studio album by Neal Morse
- Released: February 26, 2007
- Genre: Progressive rock, progressive metal
- Length: 75:59
- Label: Metal Blade; Radiant Records
- Producer: Neal Morse

Neal Morse chronology
With a Little Help from My Friends (2007)	Sola Scriptura (2007)	Homeland (2007)

Professional ratings
Review scores
Source	Rating
Allmusic	4/5 stars

Sola Scriptura (Latin for "by scripture alone") is the sixth album by Christian progressive rock multi-instrumentalist Neal Morse. Released in 2007, it is a concept album about the life of the German theologian Martin Luther.

Performers on the record include Morse (vocals, keyboards, and guitar), Mike Portnoy (Dream Theater) on drums, Randy George (Ajalon) on bass guitar, and Paul Gilbert (Racer X and Mr. Big) on guitar on the tracks "Upon the Door," "Do You Know My Name?" and "Two Down, One to Go."

== Track listing ==
All songs written by Neal Morse.

No.	Title	Parts	Length
1.	"The Door"	1. "Introduction"; 2. "In the Name of God"; 3. "All I Ask For"; 4. "Mercy for Sale"; 5. "Keep Silent"; 6. "Upon the Door"	29:14
2.	"The Conflict"	1. "Do You Know My Name?"; 2. "Party to the Lie"; 3. "Underground"; 4. "Two Down, One to Go"; 5. "The Vineyard"; 6. "Already Home"	25:00
3.	"Heaven in My Heart"		5:11
4.	"The Conclusion"	1. "Randy's Jam"; 2. "Long Night's Journey"; 3. "Re-Introduction"; 4. "Come Out of Her"; 5. "Clothed with the Sun"; 6. "In Closing..."	16:34
Total length:			75:59

== Critical reception ==
In 2018, Prog Report ranked Sola Scriptura #2 all time in the Neal Morse discography behind The Similitude of a Dream.

== Personnel ==
=== Band ===
- Neal Morse – keyboards, guitars, vocals
- Mike Portnoy – drums
- Randy George – bass

=== Guest ===
- Paul Gilbert – lead guitar in "Upon the Door" and "Do You Know My Name?", flamenco guitar in "Two Down, One to Go"

=== Additional musicians ===
- Chris Carmichael – violin, viola, electric violin
- Michael Thurman – French horn
- Rachel Rigdon – violin
- Hannah Vanderpool – cello
- Debbie Bresee – background vocals
- Richard Morse – background vocals
- April Zachary – background vocals
- Wade Browne – background vocals
- Joey Pippin – background vocals
- Amy Pippin – background vocals
- Revonna Cooper – background vocals
- Wil Henderson – additional vocals

Technical personnel

- Rich Mouser – mixing
