= Paul Gilbert =

American guitarist and founding member of Mr. Big

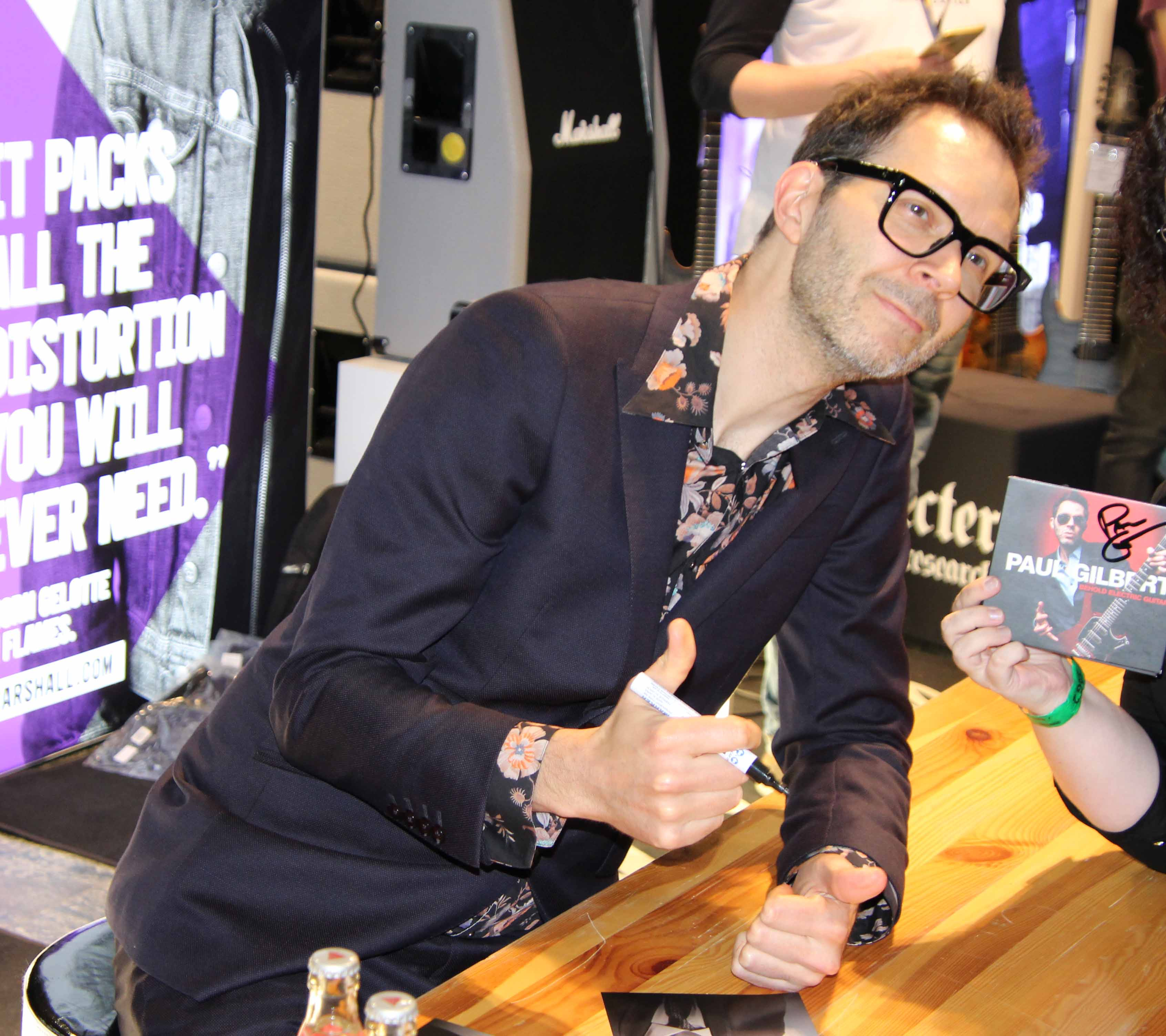
- Gilbert in 2019

Background information
- Born: November 6, 1966 (age 60); Carbondale, Illinois, U.S.
- Genres: Hard rock; instrumental rock; heavy metal; blues rock; power pop; neoclassical metal; pop metal; speed metal; progressive metal
- Occupation: Musician
- Instruments: Guitar; vocals
- Years active: 1983–present
- Labels: Universal Japan; Shrapnel; Music Theories Recordings
- Member of: Racer X; Mr. Big
- Formerly of: Black Sheep; Cygnus and the Sea Monsters; Yellow Matter Custard; The Electric Fence
- Website: paulgilbert.com

Paul Brandon Gilbert (born November 6, 1966) is an American hard rock and heavy metal guitarist. He is the co-founder of the band Mr. Big, and was also a member of Racer X, with whom he released several albums. In 1996, Gilbert launched a solo career, for which he has released numerous solo albums, and featured in numerous collaborations and guest appearances on other musicians' albums.

Gilbert was voted fourth-best on Guitar One magazine's 2007 "Top 10 Greatest Guitar Shredders of All Time". He was also ranked in Guitar World's 2008 list, "50 Fastest Guitarists of All Time". Gilbert was ranked number one in Loudwire Magazine's list of "10 Stupidly Fast Guitarists in Metal".

== Shrapnel Records ==
Gilbert was raised mostly near Pittsburgh in Greensburg, Pennsylvania. He began playing music at age six; by age 15, he was playing local clubs with his band (Tau Zero), and had been featured in Guitar Player magazine (alongside fellow up-and-comer Yngwie Malmsteen). In 1982, Gilbert attended a guitar seminar hosted by Randy Rhoads, whom he also saw perform live twice. Around 1981, Gilbert first contacted Mike Varney (founder of Shrapnel Records), asking for a gig with metal mega-star Ozzy Osbourne. At the time, Varney did not think Osbourne would want a 15-year-old guitarist; but, after listening to Gilbert's demo tape, he changed his mind. They continued talking over the next three years, culminating in Gilbert's 1984 cross-country move to Los Angeles to attend the GIT (Guitar Institute of Technology). Even at the young age of 17, Gilbert quickly became a local legend due to his advanced and extremely fast alternate picking technique, his young age, and his massive repertoire of cover material. He was hired as a GIT instructor in 1985, and recorded Racer X's debut album Street Lethal soon after.

== Racer X ==
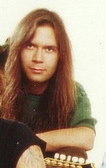
Gilbert in 1992

Formed in Los Angeles in 1985, Racer X was originally composed of Paul Gilbert (lead guitar), Juan Alderete (bass guitar), Harry Gschoesser (drums), and Jeff Martin (vocals). They were heavily influenced by Judas Priest, and Gilbert's playing was reminiscent of Yngwie Malmsteen, displaying fast-driven solos with advanced technique. Gschoesser was replaced by Scott Travis (later Judas Priest's drummer) in 1986, and Bruce Bouillet, one of Gilbert's private students at GIT, was added as a second guitarist after demonstrating an ability to harmonize Gilbert's string skipping sequences. Gilbert gained recognition as one of the world's fastest guitarists due to incredibly technical pieces like "Technical Difficulties", "Frenzy", "Scarified", "Y.R.O." and "Scit Scat Wah". Around this time, Gilbert also recorded his first instructional video, Intense Rock, in which he demonstrated a number of his famous techniques and practice regimens in detail. Throughout his career he released many more instructional videos.

Racer X toured the American southwest, primarily the state of California, selling out thousand-seat venues. Despite their rigorous fan base, they had no prospects for a major label deal and Gilbert became increasingly disinterested. In 1987, he was approached by Talas bassist Billy Sheehan, one of his biggest influences, about forming a band; it became Mr. Big.

Gilbert left Racer X in 1988, but reformed it after the 1996 breakup of Mr. Big. Paul contacted the members of Racer X, and all agreed to return with the exception of Bruce Bouillet, who could barely play guitar at the time due to a severe bout of carpal tunnel syndrome. In mid-1999, the band recorded the album Technical Difficulties, which went gold in Japan. Racer X's new record label requested a follow-up; so, in late 2000, they released Superheroes, mixed by Bouillet.

To further capitalize on their new-found success in Japan, Universal Japan requested that the band perform for a live-album CD and DVD. On May 25, 2001, the band played their first live performance in thirteen years, to a sold-out crowd, at the world-famous Whisky a Go Go in Los Angeles. The resulting CD and DVD were released in 2002 under the title Snowball of Doom.

In January 2002, in support of Superheroes and Snowball of Doom, Racer X toured Japan and Taiwan. The band performed these shows in their Superheroes costumes. The tour's final show, in Yokohama, was hastily recorded in two tracks on the sound board and later released as Snowball of Doom 2. Later that year, Universal Japan pushed for another Racer X release. In October 2002, all four members of Racer X gathered at Gilbert's house in Las Vegas to record Getting Heavier, which was sold alongside Snowball of Doom 2 in a package deal. Although the album was a successful release in Japan, some fans were disappointed with the lighter tracks, which resembled a Paul Gilbert solo album more than a conventional Racer X album.

Racer X performed at the 2009 NAMM Show at the Anaheim Convention Center in Anaheim, California. Andy Timmons and his band opened the show, followed by a solo set from Paul Gilbert, and finally Racer X. The Racer X lineup consisted of Paul Gilbert, Scott Travis, Jeff Martin and John Alderete.

== Mr. Big ==
When bass guitarist Billy Sheehan left David Lee Roth's solo band in 1988, he and Gilbert co-founded Mr. Big, which included Pat Torpey on drums and Eric Martin on vocals. The band was initially successful in Japan, but achieved international stardom with the 1991 release of their second studio album Lean into It. This album featured the acoustic ballad "To Be with You", which received strong play on radio stations and MTV, rising to #1 on the Billboard Hot 100.

Mr. Big broke up in 1996, at which point Gilbert launched his solo career. When Mr. Big reformed soon after, Gilbert, who was already committed to his own record contract, was replaced by Richie Kotzen. Mr. Big disbanded again in 2002, but Gilbert reunited the original members in June 2009 for a worldwide reunion tour. The band recorded a new album with producer Kevin Shirley titled What If.... The album was released in Japan on December 15, 2010, in Europe on January 21, 2011, and in the U.S. in Feb. 2011. A tour to support the album kicked off at the Hollywood location of The House of Blues on April 2, 2011, followed by several dates in Japan. In May and June 2011, the tour continued in Taiwan, China, Korea, the Philippines, and Europe.

In September 2014, Mr. Big released ...The Stories We Could Tell, produced by Pat Regan. During the recording of the album, it was revealed that drummer Pat Torpey had been diagnosed with Parkinson's disease. For the tour that followed, Mr. Big enlisted the help of drummer Matt Starr of Burning Rain, to take over Torpey's drumming duties, whilst Torpey acted as "drum producer". Torpey did accompany the band on the subsequent tour, playing hand percussion, providing backup vocals and drumming on a few tracks per show.

The band released their ninth studio effort, Defying Gravity, on July 7, 2017. It is the last album to feature Torpey's drumming and first with Matt Starr's. On February 7, 2018, Torpey died from complications of Parkinson's disease at the age of 64. His last show took place at the Wulfrun Hall in Wolverhampton on November 23, 2017. A memorial show took place on May 23, 2018, at The Canyon in Agoura Hills, California, with former member Richie Kotzen as a special guest. The all-star finale of "To Be With You" included, among others, Matt Sorum, Dave Amato, Ricky Phillips, Keith St John, Prescott Niles, Kelly Keagy, Jeff Scott Soto, Ace Von Johnson and Gregg Bissonette.

In October 2018, singer Eric Martin said in an interview with Friday NI Rocks that the band is in the process of planning their next album. According to the frontman, once the band is done with its 2019 touring commitments, they will subsequently disband: "Yeah, that's the last hurrah – that's it. It feels a little uncomfortable to keep going without Pat Torpey."

== Other projects ==
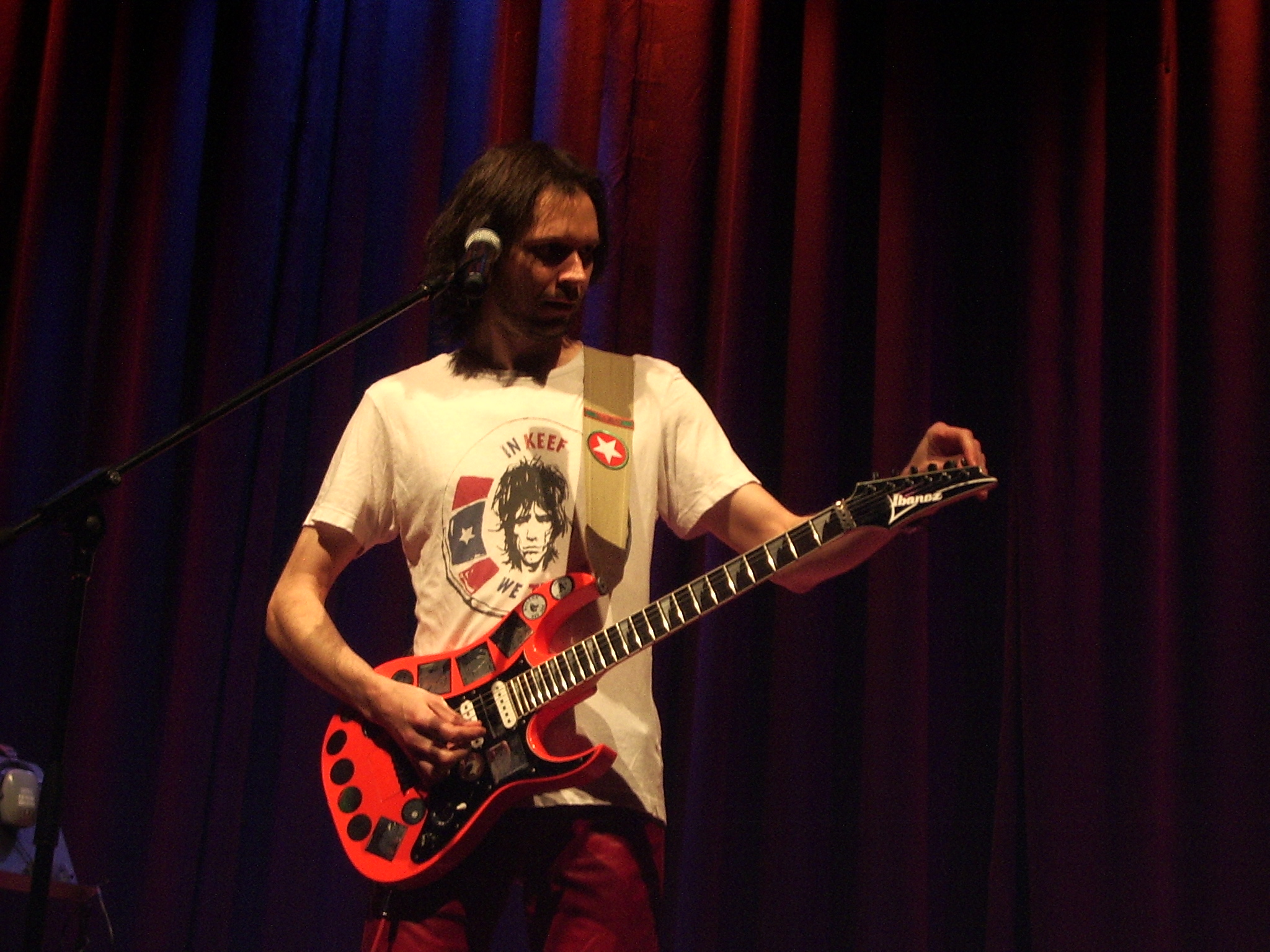
Gilbert performing in 2007

In May 2003 Gilbert performed twice with the project Yellow Matter Custard, a Beatles cover band consisting also of Mike Portnoy (Dream Theater), Neal Morse (ex-Spock's Beard), and Matt Bissonette. In February 2011, Yellow Matter Custard reformed for three shows across America. Kasim Sulton replaced Matt Bissonette for these shows due to other commitments. The band took their name from a Beatles lyric in the song "I Am the Walrus": "Yellow matter custard, dripping from a dead dog's eye".

Gilbert rejoined Portnoy along with Dave LaRue and Daniel Gildenlöw for a Led Zeppelin tribute band called Hammer of the Gods in November 2003. The same year, Gilbert toured Japan with Linus of Hollywood, TJ Helmerich, and Scot Coogan in support of his solo albums Burning Organ, Paul the Young Dude/The Best of Paul Gilbert, and Gilbert Hotel. In September 2005, he joined Portnoy, Sean Malone, and Jason McMaster in the Rush tribute band Cygnus and the Sea Monsters. In May 2006, he joined Portnoy, Gary Cherone, and Billy Sheehan to form Amazing Journey: A Tribute to The Who, playing three shows. The band (excluding Sheehan) destroyed their equipment after the show in homage.

Gilbert was revealed to be the guest guitarist on the 2007 Neal Morse solo album Sola Scriptura. That same year, Gilbert toured with Bruce Bouillet to promote Gilbert's first instrumental album Get Out of My Yard. Joining him on tour was Gilbert's wife Emi on keyboards. Gilbert also joined Joe Satriani and John Petrucci on the 2007 G3 tour. This was the fifth North American G3 run and the 12th tour worldwide since its inception. On January 23, 2008, Gilbert released an instrumental album titled Silence Followed by a Deafening Roar. The album was released in Europe on March 31, 2008, and in America on April 8, 2008. This was Gilbert's second instrumental album.

On October 22, 2008, Gilbert released an album with vocalist Freddie Nelson entitled United States. The collaboration has been described as a cross between Queen and Mr. Big. Gilbert performed with Racer X at the 2009 NAMM Show at the Anaheim Convention Center in Anaheim, California. Andy Timmons and his band opened the show, followed by a solo set from Gilbert, and finally Racer X. This Racer X lineup consisted of Gilbert, Scott Travis, Jeff Martin and John Alderete. Gilbert also joined George Lynch and Richie Kotzen on the Guitar Generation tour.

On June 30, 2010, Gilbert's new album Fuzz Universe was released in Japan, with a release in America and Europe soon after. It was Gilbert's third instrumental solo album. A cover version of Johnny Cash's "Leave That Junk Alone" was featured as a Japanese bonus track. On June 25, 2014, Gilbert released his studio album Stone Pushing Uphill Man. Initially only available in Japan, the album was eventually released in the United States on August 12, 2014.

== Influences and style ==
When interviewed about his musical and stylistic influences, Paul Gilbert mentions many different artists, including: Randy Rhoads, Kim Mitchell, Eddie Van Halen, Yngwie Malmsteen, Tony Iommi, Alex Lifeson, Jimmy Page, Johnny Ramone, Robin Trower, Ritchie Blackmore, Pat Travers, Gary Moore, Michael Schenker, Judas Priest, Akira Takasaki, Steve Clark, Jimi Hendrix, Kiss, and The Ramones. On many occasions, Gilbert has stated that his uncle Jimi Kidd was vital in heavily fueling Gilbert's childhood interest in playing guitar. Gilbert grew up a great fan of Rush, Todd Rundgren, Cheap Trick and The Beatles, artists who frequently influence his songwriting style. He stated on the Space Ship Live DVD that George Harrison is one of his favorite guitar players. Guitar World magazine declared him one of 50 of the world's fastest guitarists of all time, along with Buckethead, Eddie Van Halen, and Yngwie Malmsteen.

Paul Gilbert composes music in a wide variety of styles, including pop, rock, metal, blues, and funk. He is best known for his shredding, stylistic versatility and efficient staccato picking technique. He combines fast picking and legato techniques in the same phrase, usually instinctively. When teaching/demonstrating a particular phrase, he has to think about what he is actually doing with his right hand in order to explain it. Despite being famous for his heavy metal work and his rapid right hand ability, Gilbert has since dissociated himself from that style of playing, instead gravitating towards blues and melodic ideas.

== Instructional career ==
Paul Gilbert wrote his own section of the British guitar magazine, Total Guitar, where he normally demonstrated guitar techniques in the magazine and accompanying CD. Even before that, he contributed instructional articles to Guitar Player magazine in a late 1980s/early 1990s series entitled "Terrifying Guitar 101". His period of working with Total Guitar spanned 31 issues until the November 2006 issue. Gilbert also teaches at the Guitar Institute of Technology (GIT) regularly, and is also an "honorary dean" of the GIT division in Japan. Gilbert visits Japan, enjoying the lifestyle like his Shrapnel labelmate Marty Friedman, who still lives in Japan and speaks Japanese fluently. Gilbert is known for his instructional videos, which are often comical in nature. One of his instructional videos includes him pulling a rabbit out of his guitar, putting his guitar in a straitjacket and having presents thrown at him by members of the film crew. Gilbert also was, for a short time, the guitar teacher of Buckethead, Joey Tafolla, Russ Parrish (A.K.A. Satchel from Steel Panther), Michelle Meldrum (the late wife of Europe guitarist John Norum) and Nicole Couch of Phantom Blue. Gilbert now writes a column for Premier Guitar entitled "Shred Your Enthusiasm". In May 2012 he launched the Online Rock Guitar School with Paul Gilbert as a part of the ArtistWorks Guitar Campus. In 2026 Paul announced he will no longer be responding to Video Exchanges at ArtistWorks. During the years he made over 16000 videos.

In August 2014, Gilbert participated in the G4 Experience—a week-long guitar camp—with fellow guitarists Joe Satriani, Andy Timmons, and multi-instrumentalist Mike Keneally.

== Equipment ==
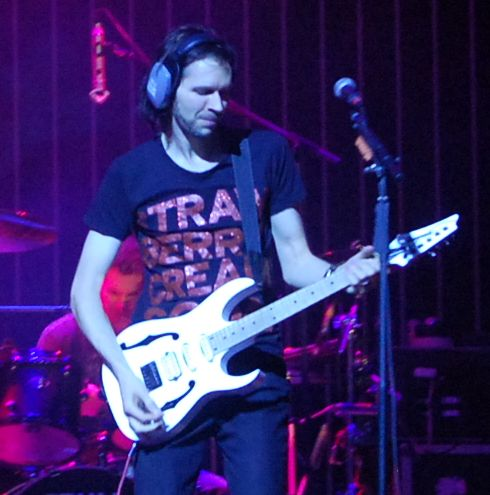
Gilbert playing his signature guitar 2007

Paul Gilbert primarily uses his Ibanez PGM signature series guitars, identified by the unique painted on "F-holes". Although earlier PGM models featured the Ibanez Lo-Pro/Edge double locking tremolo system, many of his guitars (such as his main PGM300) were modified to accommodate a fixed bridge after he stopped using whammy bars in the early 90s, hence the Ibanez PGM301 guitar. Along with his signature guitars, Gilbert often uses his sticker-covered "Dino" Ibanez RG750, in addition to a wide variety of Ibanez solid-body and semi-hollow electric guitars. Recently, Gilbert has been using Ibanez "Fireman" (a reversed-body Ibanez Iceman with single-coil pickups and an extra cutaway) guitars, which he designed himself. A red version of The Ibanez Fireman is to be mass-produced for consumers at a more affordable price than the Ibanez PGMFRM1 (current Paul Gilbert signature Fireman) in Fall 2011. Gilbert now has a short (22.2 inch) scale signature guitar – the Ibanez PGMM31 based on the existing Ibanez Mikro range.

In 2014, Gilbert announced his new Ibanez signature model guitar, FRM250MF, at the NAMM Show in 2014.

Gilbert endorses Direct Sound extreme isolation headphones, using the EX-29 model. Suffering tinnitus after years of loud music in headphones and live, Paul has posted a list of recommendations on how to help prevent tinnitus and noise-induced loss.

In 2020, Gilbert collaborated with boutique pedal maker JHS Pedals and released the "PG-14" tube-like distortion pedal.

Gilbert is a long time user of Ernie Ball strings and has used a variety of different gauges on his electric guitars, and he has stated he has used as light as their .08-.38 strings (Extra Slinky) and has used as heavy as their .11-.48 strings (Power Slinky). For picks, Gilbert currently uses several variations of Dunlop Tortex .50mm, .60mm and .73mm picks, explaining that he switched to thin picks because he likes the tone and the pick scratches they offer.

== Personal life ==
Gilbert was married from 1993 to 1998 to Patricia Gilbert (née Patterson).

As of 2012, Gilbert has resided in Portland, Oregon, with his second wife, Emi Gilbert, who studied English at the Tokyo University of Foreign Studies and worked as a Japanese/ English-language marketing coordinator for the International Music Department at Sony Music Entertainment. They married in 2005 and have a son, born in 2014.

== Discography ==
=== Solo ===
- King of Clubs (1997; Japan Oricon Album Chart #28)
- Flying Dog (1998; Japan Oricon Album Chart #23)
- Alligator Farm (2000; Japan Oricon Album Chart #24)
- Raw Blues Power (2002; w/ Jimi Kidd; Japan Oricon Album Chart #94)
- Burning Organ (2002; Japan Oricon Album Chart #27)
- Gilbert Hotel (2003)
- Space Ship One (2005; Japan Oricon Album Chart #53)
- Get Out of My Yard (2006; Japan Oricon Album Chart #52)
- Silence Followed by a Deafening Roar (2008; Japan Oricon Album Chart #39)
- United States (2009; w/ Freddie Nelson)
- Fuzz Universe (2010; Japan Oricon Album Chart #57)
- Vibrato (2012)
- Stone Pushing Uphill Man (2014)
- I Can Destroy (2016)
- Behold Electric Guitar (2019)
- Werewolves of Portland (2021)
- 'TWAS (2021)
- The Dio Album (2023)
- WROC (2026)

==== EPs ====
- Tribute to Jimi Hendrix (1991; Japan Oricon Album Chart #59)
- Tough Eskimo (2007)

==== Live albums ====
- Beehive Live (1999; Japan Oricon Album Chart #72)
- Acoustic Samurai (2003; Japan Oricon Album Chart #94)
- PG-30 Zepp Tokyo 2016.9.26' (2017)

==== Compilation albums ====
- Paul the Young Dude/The Best of Paul Gilbert (2003; Japan Oricon Album Chart #31)

=== with Racer X ===
See: Racer X Discography

- Street Lethal (1986)
- Second Heat (1987)
- Technical Difficulties (1999)
- Superheroes (2000)
- Getting Heavier (2002)

=== with Mr. Big ===
See: Mr. Big discography

- Mr. Big (1989)
- Lean into It (1991)
- Bump Ahead (1993)
- Hey Man (1996)
- What If... (2011)
- ...The Stories We Could Tell (2014)
- Defying Gravity (2017)

=== Guest appearances ===
- Black Sheep – Trouble in the Streets (1985)
- Missing Lynx – Atomic Basement Tapes (1985)
- Darrell Mansfield Band – Revelation (1985)
- Jeff Berlin – Pump It! (1986)
- Joey Tafolla – Out of the Sun (1987)
- Todd Rundgren – Nearly Human (1989)
- Various artists – Guitars That Rule the World (1992)
- Samad – Samad (1994)
- Carmine Appice's Guitar Zeus – Carmine Appice's Guitar Zeus (1996)
- Akira Takasaki – Wa (1996)
- Gregg Bissonette – Gregg Bissonette (1998)
- Pat Torpey – Odd Man Out (1998)
- Pat Torpey – Y2K: Odd Man Out (1999)
- Various artists – In Rock Soundtrack (2000)
- Hughes Turner Project – HTP (2002)
- Various artists – Battle Gear III: The Edge (2003)
- Kim Fox – Return to Planet Earth (2003)
- Various artists – Guitar Wars (2003)
- Marco Minnemann – Mieze (2004)
- Pintsize – Five Feet... No Inches (2005; credited as "Dick Image")
- Marco Minnemann – Contraire de la chanson (2006)
- Wisely – Parador (2006)
- Jeff Pilson's War and Peace – Light at the End of the Tunnel (2006)
- Jeff Martin – The Fool (2006)
- Neal Morse – Sola Scriptura (2007)
- Neal Morse – Lifeline (2008)
- MC Lars – This Gigantic Robot Kills – (2009)
- Bowling for Soup – Merry Flippin' Christmas Volume 1 (2009)
- MC Lars – "Guitar Hero Hero" (2009)
- Neal Morse – Momentum (2012)
- Nick Johnston- In A Locked Room On The Moon (2013)
- Jacky Vincent – Star X Speed Story (2013)
- Ciro Manna – XY (2015)
- Ayreon – The Source (2017)
- Jason Becker – Triumphant Hearts (2018)
- Donnie Vie – Beautiful Things (2019)
- Nick D'Virgilio - Invisible (2020)

=== Tribute album appearances ===
- Various artists – Smoke on the Water: A Tribute (1994)
- Various artists – Jeffology: A Guitar Chronicle (1996)
- Various artists – Merry Axemas: A Guitar Christmas (1997)
- Various artists – Humanary Stew: A Tribute to Alice Cooper (1999)
- Various artists – Warmth in the Wilderness: A Tribute to Jason Becker (2001)
- Yellow Matter Custard – One Night in New York City (2003)
- Various artists – Spin the Bottle: an All-Star Tribute to Kiss (2004)
- Various artists – Numbers from the Beast: An All Star Tribute to Iron Maiden (2005)
- Hammer of the Gods – Two Nights in North America (June 12, 2006)
- Cygnus and the Sea Monsters – One Night in Chicago (2006)
- Amazing Journey – One Night in New York City (March 18, 2007)
- Yellow Matter Custard – One More Night In New York City (2011)

== Videography ==
- Intense Rock Jams – Sequences & Techniques VHS version (1988)
- Intense Rock II featuring Paul Gilbert VHS version (1991)
- Terrifying Guitar Trip VHS version (1995)
- Guitars from Mars Japanese DVD release (1996)
- Guitars from Mars II Japanese DVD release (1996)
- Eleven Thousand Notes DVD
- Guitar Wars DVD
- Space Ship Live DVD (2005)
- Complete Intense Rock DVD (2006)
- Terrifying Guitar Trip DVD (2006)
- Get Out Of My Yard Guitar Instructional DVD/VCD (2007)
- One Night In New York City – Yellow Matter Custard (2003)
- Two Nights In North America – Hammer Of The Gods (2006)
- One Night In Chicago – Cygnus And The Sea Monsters (2006)
- One Night In New York City – Amazing Journey (2007)
- Silence Followed By A Deafening Roar Guitar Instructional DVD And Shred Annex (2008)
- PG-30 Live At Zepp Tokyo 2016 DVD (2017)
