= Alligator Farm (album) =

Studio album by Paul Gilbert
- Released: 2000
- Genre: Hard rock, power pop
- Length: 52:41
- Label: Shrapnel Records
- Producer: Paul Gilbert

Paul Gilbert chronology
Flying Dog (1998)	Alligator Farm (2000)	Raw Blues Power (2002)

Professional ratings
Review scores
Source	Rating
AllMusic	3/5 stars

Alligator Farm is the third solo studio album by American musician Paul Gilbert, formerly of the heavy metal band Racer X and the hard rock band Mr. Big. It was released in 2000.

== Track listing ==
All songs written by Paul Gilbert except where noted:

No.	Title	Writer(s)	Length
1.	"Better Chords"	Paul Gilbert	1:03
2.	"Individually Twisted"		4:05
3.	"Cut, Cut, Cut"		3:22
4.	"Alligator Farm"		3:42
5.	"Attitude Boy Will Overcome"		4:03
6.	"2 Become 1" (Spice Girls cover)	Richard Stannard, Spice Girls, Matt Rowe	5:16
7.	"Lancelot Link"		0:35
8.	"Rosalinda Told Me"		3:57
9.	"Let the Computer Decide" (instrumental)		3:58
10.	"Koto Girl"		3:35
11.	"Dreamed Victoria"		4:23
12.	"Six Billion People"		1:38
13.	"The Ballad of the Last Lions"	Jimi Kidd	9:31
14.	"Whole Lotta Sonata" (instrumental)	Wolfgang Amadeus Mozart (Arranged by Paul Gilbert)	3:33
Total length:			52:41

== Personnel ==
- Paul Gilbert – guitars, lead and backing vocals
- Tony Spinner – guitars, backing vocals
- Scotty Johnson – guitars, keyboards
- Mike Szuter – bass guitar, backing vocals
- Jeff Martin – drums, percussion, backing vocals

=== Additional musicians ===
- Jimi Kidd – guitars on "The Ballad of the Last Lions"
- Han Xiang – koto on "Koto Girl"
- Jeff Scott Soto – shouts on ""Cut, Cut, Cut"
- Kate Gilbert – shouts on "Lancelot Link"
- Julian Quayle – space pilot voice on "Let the Computer Decide"
- James Chiang – robot voice on "Let the Computer Decide"

=== Production ===
- Tom King-Size – engineering, Mixing
- Steve Hall – mastering
- Denny Thomas – engineer
- Dan McCabe – assistant engineer
- William Hames – photography
- Harry Freemantle – art direction
- David Frangioni – mixing
