= Flying Dog =

Studio album by Paul Gilbert
- Released: 2 December 1998 (Japan); 2 February 1999 (United States)
- Genre: Hard rock, power pop, pop rock
- Length: 50:22
- Label: Mercury Records
- Producer: Paul Gilbert

Paul Gilbert chronology
King of Clubs (1997)	Flying Dog (1998)	Alligator Farm (2000)

Professional ratings
Review scores
Source	Rating
Allmusic	3.5/5 stars

Flying Dog is the second studio album released by former Racer X and Mr. Big guitarist Paul Gilbert.

== Track listing ==
No.	Title	Writer(s)	Length
1.	"Get It"	Paul Gilbert	2:28
2.	"Girl Crazy"	Donnie Vie, Chip Z'Nuff	3:55
3.	"Be My Wife"	Gilbert	5:58
4.	"Mr. Skin" (Originally recorded by Spirit)	Jay Ferguson	3:53
5.	"Beautiful Girls Are Insane"	Gilbert	3:20
6.	"Midnight Maryanne"	Gilbert	3:34
7.	"Heavy Disco Trip"	Gilbert	3:20
8.	"Kate Is a Star"	Gilbert, Russ Parrish	4:54
9.	"Down to Mexico"	Gilbert	3:30
10.	"Tell the Truth"	Gilbert	3:47
11.	"Wrong Man"	Gilbert	3:53
12.	"Gilberto Concerto" (Instrumental)	Johann Christoph Friedrich Bach (Arranged by Paul Gilbert)	7:48
Total length:			50:22

Japanese edition bonus disc
No.	Title	Writer(s)	Length
13.	"Las Vegas Christmas"	Gilbert	2:42
14.	"Barbie Bang Your Head"	Gilbert	5:05

== Personnel ==
- Paul Gilbert – vocals, guitars, organ and percussion
- Bruce Bouillet – guitar
- Tony Spinner – guitars and backing vocals
- Mike Szuter – bass guitar and backing vocals
- Johnny Fedevich – drums
- Dave Richardson – piano (Track 1 on disc two)

=== Production ===
- Tom Size - Mixing, Engineering
