= Space Ship One (album) =

Studio album by Paul Gilbert
- Released: March 23, 2005 (Japan)
- Genre: Rock
- Length: 56:38
- Label: Shrapnel
- Producer: Paul Gilbert

Paul Gilbert chronology
Gilbert Hotel (2003)	Space Ship One (2005)	Get Out of My Yard (2006)

Space Ship One is the seventh studio album by Paul Gilbert, best known as the guitarist of the hard rock band Mr. Big and formerly of Racer X. It was released in 2005.

Professional ratings
Review scores
Source	Rating
Allmusic	3.5/5 stars

== Track listing ==
All songs written by Paul Gilbert, except where noted:

No.	Title	Writer(s)	Length
1.	"Space Ship One"	Paul Gilbert	5:58
2.	"Every Hot Girl Is a Rockstar"	Gilbert	3:05
3.	"On the Way to Hell"	Gilbert	2:52
4.	"SVT"	Gilbert	4:03
5.	"Jackhammer (instrumental)"	Gilbert	5:07
6.	"Terrible Man"	Gilbert	3:21
7.	"Interaction"	Gilbert	4:19
8.	"G9 (instrumental)"	Gilbert	2:16
9.	"Mr. Spock"	Gilbert	4:52
10.	"Boku No Atama"	Gilbert	2:30
11.	"Good Man"	Gilbert	3:58
12.	"Wash My Car"	Gilbert	4:14
13.	"It's All Too Much"	George Harrison	6:48
14.	"We All Dream of Love"	Gilbert	3:15
Total length:			56:38

- Track 13 originally recorded by the Beatles on the album Yellow Submarine.

== Musicians ==
- Paul Gilbert – guitar, vocals
- Linus of Hollywood – bass guitar
- Marco Minnemann – drums

== Production ==
- Larry Freemantle – art direction
- Steve Hall – mastering
- William Hames – photography
- Tim Size – engineer
- Tim Heyne – management
