= +1 (album) =

- Limited edition cover

Studio album by Kaela Kimura
- Released: April 2, 2008
- Genre: J-pop
- Label: Columbia

Kaela Kimura chronology
Scratch (2007)	+1 (2008)	HOCUS POCUS (2009)

Alternative Cover
- Normal edition cover

+1 is the fourth album by Japanese pop singer Kaela Kimura, released on April 2, 2008.

== Release ==
"Samantha" is the first single taken from +1. It reached number 8 on the Oricon charts. The second single, "Yellow", was released on October 24, 2007. It peaked at #5 on the Japanese Oricon charts.

== Track listing ==
All lyrics are written by Kaela Kimura, except #9 (Jez Ashurst, Michael Hopkins, Michelle Margherita, Andrew Campbell).

No.	Title	Music	Arranger(s)	Length
1.	"NO IMAGE"	Mito (Clammbon)
2.	"Jasper"	Takkyu Ishino (Denki Groove)	Takkyu Ishino
3.	"Yellow"	Shinobu Watanabe (Asparagus)	Shinobu Watanabe
4.	"STARs"	A×S×E (BOaT, Natsumen)
5.	"Fa.Mi.Re.Do" (ファミレド)	Isamu Fujita (Mo'some Tonebender)
6.	"dejavu"	Shigekazu Aida (El-Malo, HiGE)	Shigekazu Aida
7.	"Samantha"	Shigekazu Aida	Shigekazu Aida
8.	"+1"	Kiyoshi Takakuwa (Curly Giraffe, Great3, Honesty)
9.	"No Reason Why"	Jez Ashurst, Michael Hopkins, Michelle Margherita, Andrew Campbell	Shigekazu Aida
10.	"Kagamiyo, Kagami" (鏡よ鏡)	YoheyOKAMOTO
11.	"Hayaru Kimochiteki, My World" (はやる気持ち的 My World)	Shinobu Watanabe
12.	"1115"	Tamio Okuda (Unicorn)
13.	"Humpty Dumpty"	Daisuke Endō (De De Mouse)
