= Circle (Kaela Kimura album) =

Studio album by Kaela Kimura
- Released: March 8, 2006
- Genre: J-pop
- Label: Columbia Music Entertainment

Kaela Kimura chronology
KAELA (2004)	Circle (2006)	Scratch (2007)

Circle is the second album by Japanese pop singer Kaela Kimura, released on March 8, 2006.

== Release ==
"RIRURA RIRUHA [リルラ リルハ]" (also known as "Real Life Real Heart") is the first single taken from Circle. Released March 30, 2005, it peaked at number three on the Japan Oricon singles chart, Kimura's highest charting single to date. By the end of 2005, Real Life Real Heart had sold 117,299 copies.

The second single, "Beat", was released as the second single from her album, Circle, on October 5, 2005. It peaked at #7 on the Oricon charts.

The third single, "You", was released as the third single from her album, Circle, on January 18, 2006. It peaked at number seven on the Japan Oricon singles chart.

== Track listing ==
All lyrics are written by Kaela Kimura, except #7(written by Shinobu Watanabe).

No.	Title	Music	Arranger(s)	Length
1.	"Rirura Riruha" (リルラ リルハ)	Shigekazu Aida (El-Malo, HiGE)	Shigekazu Aida
2.	"tea cup"	Kei Takakuwa (Curly Giraffe, Great3, Honesty)	Shigekazu Aida
3.	"I♥hug"	Hirohisa Horie (Neil&Iraiza)	Hirohisa Horie
4.	"BEAT" (Album Version)	Tamio Okuda (Unicorn)	Tamio Okuda
5.	"Thrill Thrill Licker"	Shigekazu Aida	Shigekazu Aida
6.	"Twinkle" (NANA Version)	Shigekazu Aida	Shigekazu Aida
7.	"You"	Shinobu Watanabe (Asparagus)	Shinobu Watanabe
8.	"Pioneer"	Shigekazu Aida	Shigekazu Aida
9.	"Deep Blue Sky"	Hideki Yoshimura (Bloodthirsty Butchers)	Shigekazu Aida
10.	"Dancing Now"	Shigeru Kishida (Quruli)	Shigekazu Aida
11.	"Circle"	Mito (Clammbon)	Mito
12.	"hachimitsu" (はちみつ)	Shigekazu Aida	Shigekazu Aida
13.	"C-hildren"	Hisako Tabuchi (Bloodthirsty Butchers)	Shigekazu Aida
