= Kaela =

Studio album by Kaela Kimura
- Released: December 8, 2004
- Genre: J-pop
- Label: Columbia Music Entertainment

Kaela Kimura chronology
Kaela (2004)	Circle (2006)

Kaela is the first album released by Japanese pop singer Kaela Kimura. It was released on December 8, 2004, and peaked at number seven on the Japanese charts. It features the singles, "Level 42" (released June 23, 2004) and "Happiness!!!" (released October 27, 2004). "Level 42" peaked at number fourteen on the Japan Oricon singles chart.

== Track listing ==
No.	Title	Lyrics	Music	Arranger(s)	Length
1.	"Untie" (album version)	Kaela Kimura	Taiyō Yamazawa	Seiji Mutō
2.	"You Know You Love Me?"	Kaela Kimura, animo	animo	animo
3.	"Ano Koro" (あの頃)	Kaela Kimura	Shigekazu Aida (El-Malo, HiGE)	Shigekazu Aida
4.	"Happiness!!!"	Kaela Kimura	Taiyō Yamazawa	Seiji Mutō
5.	"Inventor"	Kaela Kimura	Nobuyuki Ōhashi	Seiji Mutō
6.	"D.T.S."	Kaela Kimura	Taiyō Yamazawa	Seiji Mutō
7.	"Level 42" (album take)	Kaela Kimura	Taiyō Yamazawa	Seiji Mutō
8.	"Dare" (誰)	Kaela Kimura	Shigekazu Aida (El-Malo, HiGE)	Shigekazu Aida
9.	"Because"	Kaela Kimura, animo	animo	Yukari Hashimoto, animo
10.	"Weak"	Kaela Kimura	Akinori Suzuki	Akinori Suzuki
11.	"What Ever Are You Looking For?" (album version)	Kaela Kimura	Taiyō Yamazawa	Seiji Mutō
12.	"Sola"	Kaela Kimura	Taiyō Yamazawa	Seiji Mutō
