= Suemitsu & the Suemith =

Japanese musical project

- Origin: Japan
- Genres: J-pop, Power pop, Piano Rock
- Years active: 2004-present
- Labels: Rhythm Republic (2005); Ki/oon Records (2006-2008); Media Factory (2012-)
- Members: Suemitsu Atsushi
- Website: http://suemitsu-atsushi.com/

Suemitsu & the Suemith (スエミツ アンド ザ スエミス) is a Japanese solo project headed by Suemitsu Atsushi (末光篤). He performs piano and vocals for the project. Suemitsu is probably best known for performing the opening theme and second ending theme for the anime adaptation of Nodame Cantabile, entitled "Allegro Cantabile" and "Sagittarius" respectively.

== Discography ==
=== Albums ===
- 2006 – Man Here Plays Mean Piano:
  1. "Suemitsu Here Plays Mean Piano"
  2. "Irony"
  3. "Arabesque"
  4. "Skyscraper"
  5. "Basketball Game Crush"
  6. "The Desperado"
  7. "Mini Cooper"
  8. "Etude"
  9. "(I'm In) Mad Cherry Red"
  10. "Chelsea"
  11. "Part Of Your World *006 New Recording From Mosh Pit On Disney" (Bonus Track)
  12. "Don't You Worry 'Bout A Thing From Rock Motown" (Bonus Track)
  13. "Irony Bittersweet Irony" Japanese Version (Bonus Track)
  14. "Arabesque Melody Played By Great Pianist" Japanese Version (Bonus Track)
- 2007 – The Piano It's Me
- 2008 – Shock on the Piano
- 2008 – "Best Angle For The Pianist"

=== Singles ===
- 14 June 2006 – "Sherbet Snow and the Airplane"
- 23 August 2006 – "Astaire"
- 6 December 2006 – "Sunday'z Sun"
- 21 February 2007 – "Allegro Cantabile"
- 2007 – "Sagittarius E.P."
- 2007 – "Rock a Nova E.P."
- 2008 – "Boyz, Boy Don't Cry E.P."
