= Scratch (Kaela Kimura album) =

Studio album by Kaela Kimura
- Released: February 2, 2007
- Genre: J-pop, pop rock
- Label: Columbia Music Entertainment

Kaela Kimura chronology
Circle (2006)	Scratch (2007)	+1 (2008)

Scratch is the third album by Japanese pop singer Kaela Kimura, released on February 7, 2007. It reached number one on the Japanese Oricon albums chart.

== Release ==
"Magic Music" is the first taken from Kaela Kimura's third album, Scratch, and released on June 28, 2006, It reached number seven on the Japan Oricon singles chart.

The second single, "Snowdome", was released on January 17, 2007. It peaked at number six on the Japan Oricon singles chart. The third single, "Tree Climbers", was released on September 6, 2006, and reached number six on the Japan Oricon singles chart.

== Track listing ==
All lyrics are written by Kaela Kimura, except #13 (written by Jez Ashurst).

No.	Title	Music	Length
1.	"L.drunk"	A×S×E (BOaT, Natsumen)
2.	"Magic Music"	Linus of Hollywood
3.	"Snowdome"	Beat Crusaders
4.	"WANI to kotori" (ワニと小鳥)	Acchu Iwata (Nirgilis)
5.	"dolphin"	Seiji Kameda (Tokyo Jihen)
6.	"sweetie"	Jez Ashurst (Farrah)
7.	"kirin TAN" (きりんタン)	Shigekazu Aida (El-Malo, HiGE)
8.	"Scratch"	Toe & Kaela Kimura
9.	"Swinging London"	Kōichi Tsutaya
10.	"never land"	Mito (Clammbon)
11.	"Tree Climbers"	Shinobu Watanabe (Asparagus)
12.	"Joey Boy"	Takamune Negishi (Dr.StrangeLove)
13.	"Ground Control" (Album Mix)	Jez Ashurst
