= Gilbert Hotel =

Studio album by Paul Gilbert
- Released: 2003
- Genre: Heavy metal
- Length: 29:10
- Label: Himalaya; UICE-9007
- Producer: Paul Gilbert

Paul Gilbert chronology
Burning Organ (2002)	Gilbert Hotel (2003)	Space Ship One (2005)

Gilbert Hotel is a 2003 solo album by Paul Gilbert formerly of the heavy metal band Racer X and the hard rock band Mr. Big. It was initially released as a bonus CD with his compilation album Paul the Young Dude/The Best of Paul Gilbert.

"Time to Let You Go" was originally recorded by Enuff Z'nuff on the album Strength.

== Track listing ==
All songs written by Paul Gilbert except where noted.

1. "Three Times Rana" – 3:36
2. "Black Rain Cloud" – 3:56
3. "Escalator Music" (Instrumental) – 1:26
4. "Lay Off the Morphine" – 2:54
5. "N.F.R.O." (Instrumental) – 0:56 (J. S. Bach) - Goldberg Variation No. 5 by J.S. Bach, played on acoustic guitar.
6. "Older Guy" – 2:49
7. "The Lamb Lies Down on Broadway" – 4:56 (Peter Gabriel, Steve Hackett, Tony Banks, Mike Rutherford, Phil Collins)
8. "Time to Let You Go" – 3:17 (Donnie Vie)
9. "W.T.R.O." (Instrumental) – 2:56 (J. S. Bach) - The Prelude in C major from J. S. Bach's "Well Tempered Clavier", played on acoustic guitar.
10. "Universal" – 2:24
- Tracks 5 & 9 arranged by Paul Gilbert.

== Personnel ==
- Paul Gilbert – vocals, guitars, bass guitar, bongos, brushes and other things
- Scott Coogan – drums (Track 1), percussion and vocals (Track 8)
- Linus of Hollywood – guitars and vocals (Track 8)

== Production ==
- Assistant Producer – Warren Huart
- Assistant Mixer – Warren Huart
