= Kaela Kimura =

Japanese rock singer and model (born 1984)

- 木村 カエラ
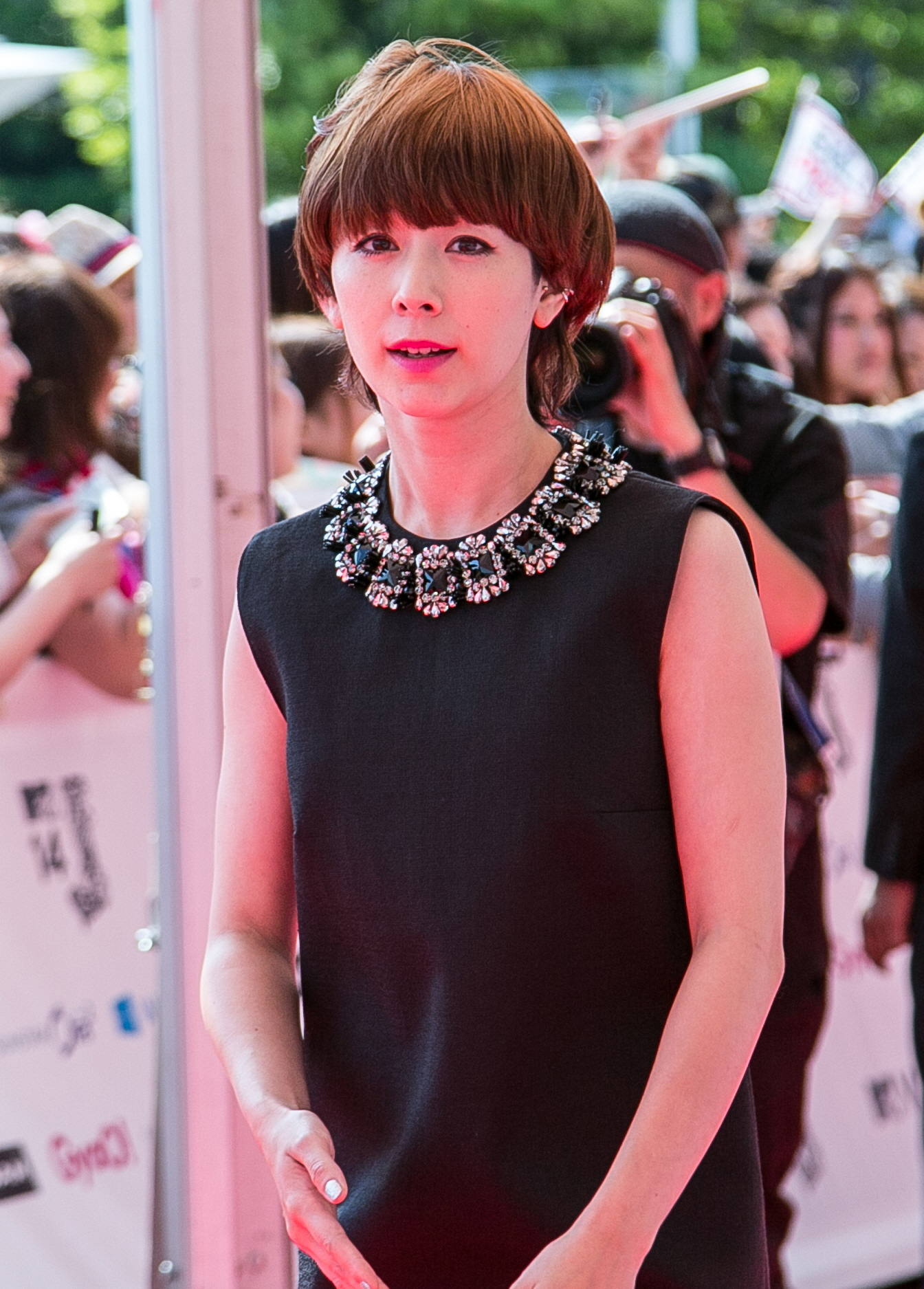
- Kaela Kimura in June 2014
- Born: Kaela Rie Kimura; October 24, 1984 (age 41); Adachi, Tokyo, Japan
- Occupations: Singer; lyricist; fashion model; television presenter
- Spouse: Eita Nagayama (m. 2010)
- Children: 2
- Relatives: Kento Nagayama (brother-in-law)
- Musical career
- Genres: Rock; pop rock; pop punk; Pop
- Instrument: Vocals
- Years active: 2004–present
- Labels: Passion; Columbia Japan; ELA
- Formerly of: Sadistic Mikaela Band
- Website: www.kaela-web.com

Kaela Kimura (木村 カエラ, Kimura Kaera; born Kaela Rie Kimura (木村 カエラ りえ, Kimura Kaera Rie); born October 24, 1984), is a Japanese pop rock singer, lyricist, fashion model and television presenter.

== Career ==
=== Modeling and early singing career ===
Kimura started working as a model in 2002 for the Japanese magazine Seventeen. She went on to host the morning television show Saku Saku from April 14, 2003, to March 31, 2006. Kimura released her only indie single titled "Level 42", but it was later released as her major label debut single on June 23, 2004, after she signed with Columbia Music Entertainment. The song was used over the end credits of Saku Saku. On October 27, Kimura released her second single, "Happiness!!!", which was followed by her debut album, Kaela, on December 8, 2004.

Following the release of her third single, "Rirura Riruha", on March 30, 2005, On June 28, a new single, "Magic Music", was released, followed by the release of "Tree Climbers" three months later. Her eighth single, "Snowdome", was released in conjunction with her third studio album, Scratch, on February 7, 2007. The song "Snowdome" was composed by Japanese pop punk band Beat Crusaders. The album Scratch topped the Oricon Albums Chart for two weeks and sold over 300,000 copies.

=== 2007–present: "Samantha" and "Moomin" ===
Kimura's ninth single, "Samantha", was released on July 18, 2007. The song was inspired by Samantha Stephens, the protagonist from the ABC TV series, Bewitched; and the music video features Hanna-Barbera designs. Later that September, a second DVD from her 'Scratch Tour' was released, followed by her tenth single, "Yellow", one month later. In early 2008, she released her eleventh single, "Jasper", a dance music that was from her previous works. On April 2, her fourth album, +1, was released and debuted on the Oricon weekly albums chart at number three. After the album's release, Kimura hosted her +1 Tour and released her first music video compilation Best Video 1. Her song, "Jasper" is the theme song for the Japanese version of Mr. Magorium's Wonder Emporium.

On September 10, 2008, Kimura released her first double A-side single "Moustache/Memories (original version)" (マスタッシュ, Masutasshu). The first A-side was used in Lucido-L commercials, while the second was featured in the Japanese film Paco to Mahō no Ehon (パコと魔法の絵本, Pako to Mahō no Ehon; Paco and the Magical Picture Book). she released her first ballad, titled "Doko" (どこ; Where) on January 28, 2009 – reaching number five on Oricon – and her fourteenth single, "Banzai"7, on May 8. These were followed by her fifth studio album, Hocus Pocus, on June 24, celebrating her fifth anniversary as a singer. In 2012, Kimura released "Wonder Volt", the theme song for the Japanese version of Frankenweenie. She wrote the theme song for the Japanese version of Moomins on the Riviera called "Eye".

== Personal life ==
On September 1, 2010, Kimura married actor Eita Nagayama after becoming engaged in late 2009. However, the official marriage announcement was delayed due to work commitments. They have two children together.

== Discography ==
- Kaela (2004)
- Circle (2006)
- Scratch (2007)
- +1 (2008)
- Hocus Pocus (2009)
- 8Eight8 (2011)
- Sync (2012)
- Rock (2013)
- Mieta (2014)
- Punky (2016)
- Ichigo (2019)
- Magnetic (2022)

== Filmography ==
- Custom Made 10.30 (2005)
- Moomins on the Riviera (2015)
