= Mr. Big discography =

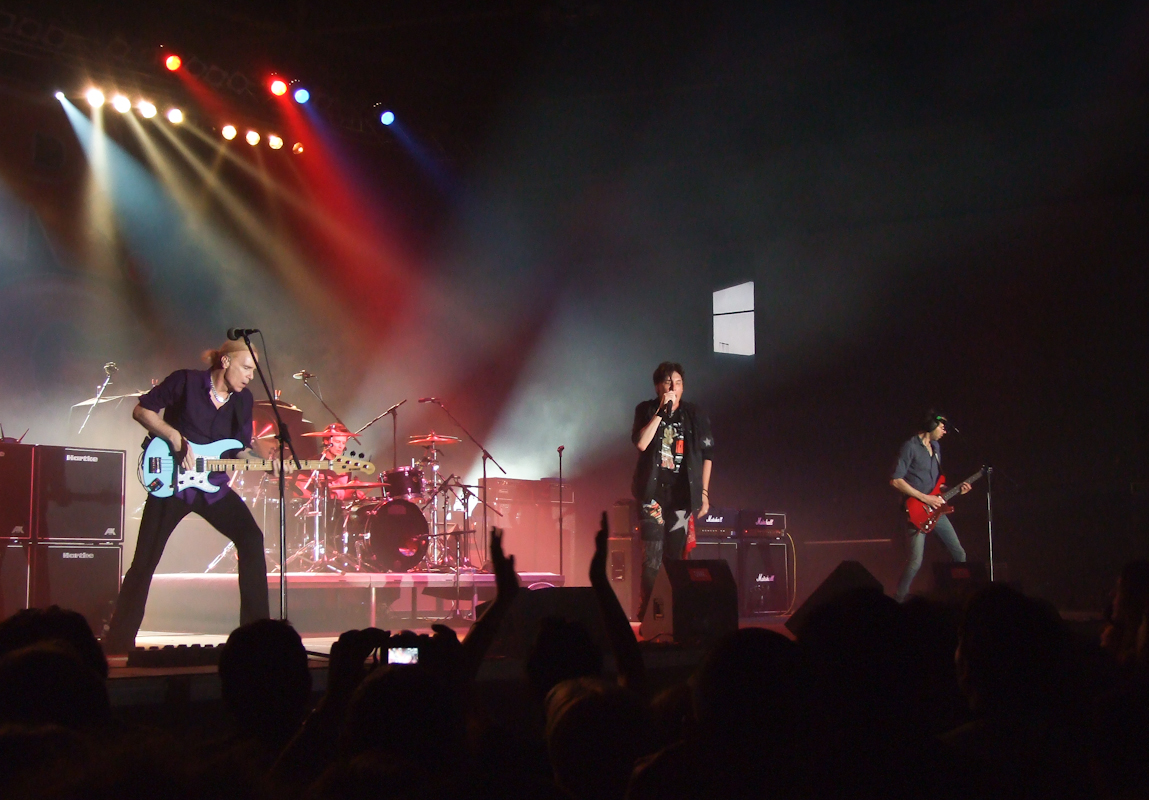
- Mr. Big in 2011
- Studio albums: 10
- Live albums: 14
- Compilation albums: 5
- Singles: 16

The discography of American hard rock band Mr. Big consists of ten studio albums, fourteen live albums, five compilation albums, and sixteen singles.

== Albums ==
=== Studio albums ===
Title	Album details	Peak chart positions					Sales	Certifications
Title	Album details	US	AUS	JPN	SWE	UK	Sales	Certifications
Mr. Big	Release date: June 20, 1989; Label: Atlantic Records; Formats: LP, CD	46	122	22	34	60		RIAJ: Gold
Lean into It	Release date: April 2, 1991; Label: Atlantic Records; Formats: LP, CD	15	18	6	13	28	US: 1,200,000	RIAA: Platinum; ARIA: Gold; RIAJ: Platinum
Bump Ahead	Release date: September 21, 1993; Label: Atlantic Records; Formats: LP, CD	82	119	4	36	61		RIAJ: Platinum
Hey Man	Release date: March 12, 1996; Label: Atlantic Records; Formats: LP, CD	—	176	1	—	—		RIAJ: Platinum
Get Over It	Release date: March 21, 2000; Label: Atlantic Records; Formats: LP, CD	—	—	5	—	—	JPN: 200,000	RIAJ: Gold
Actual Size	Release date: September 25, 2001; Label: Atlantic Records; Formats: LP, CD	—	—	5	—	—		RIAJ: Gold
What If...	Release date: February 8, 2011; Label: Frontiers Records; Formats: LP, CD	—	—	7	—	117		
...The Stories We Could Tell	Release date: September 24, 2014; Label: Frontiers Records; Formats: LP, CD	158	—	6	—	—		
Defying Gravity	Release date: July 7, 2017; Label: Frontiers Records; Formats: LP, CD	—	—	9	—	—		
Ten	Release date: July 12, 2024; Label: Frontiers Records; Formats: LP, CD	—	—	15	—	—	JPN: 2,630	
"—" denotes releases that did not chart or were not released in that territory.

=== Live albums ===
Year	Album details	Peak chart positions	Certifications
Year	Album details	JPN	Certifications
1990	Raw Like Sushi	32	
1992	Mr. Big Live (Live in San Francisco)	45	
1992	Raw Like Sushi II	8	RIAJ: Gold
1994	Japandemonium: Raw Like Sushi 3	11	RIAJ: Gold
1996	Channel V at the Hard Rock Live	32	
1997	Live at Budokan	20	
1999	Static	—	
2002	In Japan	12	
2009	Back to Budokan	50	
2012	Live from the Living Room	—	
2012	Raw Like Sushi 100: Live in Japan 100th Anniversary	—	
2015	Raw Like Sushi 114	—	
2015	R.L.S. 113 Sendai	—	
2018	Live from Milan	—	
2024	The BIG Finish Live	—	
"—" denotes releases that did not chart or were not released in that territory.

=== Compilation albums ===
Year	Album details	Peak chart positions	Certifications
Year	Album details	JPN	Certifications
1996	Big Bigger Biggest: Greatest Hits	2	RIAJ: 3× Platinum
2000	Deep Cuts: The Best of the Ballads	12	RIAJ: Gold
2004	Greatest Hits	70	
2009	Next Time Around: Best of Mr. Big	10	
2014	The Vault	—	
"—" denotes releases that did not chart or were not released in that territory.

== Singles ==
Year	Single	Peak chart positions													Certifications (sales thresholds)	Album
Year	Single	US	US Main.	JPN	UK	AUS	BEL (Fl)	CAN	GER	IRE	NLD	NZ	SWE	SWI	Certifications (sales thresholds)	Album
1989	"Addicted to That Rush"	—	39	22	—	—	—	—	—	—	—	—	—	—		Mr. Big
1991	"Daddy, Brother, Lover, Little Boy (The Electric Drill Song)"	—	—	—	101	—	—	—	—	—	—	—	—	—		Lean into It
1991	"Green-Tinted Sixties Mind"	—	33	48	72	—	—	—	—	—	—	—	—	—		Lean into It
1991	"To Be with You"	1	19	1	3	1	1	1	1	2	1	1	1	1	RIAA: Gold; ARIA: Platinum; BVMI: Gold; NVPI: Gold; BPI: Gold	Lean into It
1992	"Just Take My Heart"	16	18	—	26	27	26	16	29	18	17	40	35	20		Lean into It
1993	"Wild World"	27	33	3	59	53	24	9	24	—	11	39	10	7		Bump Ahead
1994	"Ain't Seen Love Like That"	83	—	94	—	—	—	35	—	—	—	—	—	—		Bump Ahead
1994	"Nothing but Love"	—	—	—	—	—	—	—	—	—	—	—	—	—		Bump Ahead
1996	"Goin' Where the Wind Blows"	—	—	93	—	—	—	—	—	—	—	—	—	—		Hey Man
1996	"Take Cover"	—	—	2	—	—	—	—	—	—	—	—	—	—		Hey Man
1996	"Stay Together"	—	—	7	—	—	—	—	—	—	—	—	—	—		Big Bigger Biggest: Greatest Hits
1997	"Not One Night"	—	—	—	—	—	—	—	—	—	—	—	—	—		Big Bigger Biggest: Greatest Hits
1999	"Superfantastic"	—	—	5	—	—	—	—	—	—	—	—	—	—		Get Over It
2000	"Static"	—	—	—	—	—	—	—	—	—	—	—	—	—		Get Over It
2000	"Where Are They Now"	—	—	—	—	—	—	—	—	—	—	—	—	—		Deep Cuts: The Best of the Ballads
2001	"Shine"	—	—	4	—	—	—	—	—	—	—	—	—	—		Actual Size
2001	"Arrow"	—	—	—	—	—	—	—	—	—	—	—	—	—		Actual Size
2010	"Undertow"	—	—	—	—	—	—	—	—	—	—	—	—	—		What If...
2011	"All the Way Up"	—	—	—	—	—	—	—	—	—	—	—	—	—		What If...
2017	"Everybody Needs a Little Trouble"	—	—	—	—	—	—	—	—	—	—	—	—	—		Defying Gravity
2017	"Defying Gravity"	—	—	—	—	—	—	—	—	—	—	—	—	—		Defying Gravity
2024	"Good Luck Trying"	—	—	—	—	—	—	—	—	—	—	—	—	—		Ten
2025 Forever In Our Hearts"—" denotes releases that did not chart or were not released in that territory.

== Videos ==
- Live and Kickin' (1992)
- Live (Live in San Francisco) (1992)
- A Group Portrait (1993)
- Lean Into It (1993)
- Big, Bigger, Biggest! The Best of Mr. Big (Greatest Video Hits) (1997)
- Farewell Live in Japan (2002)
- Back to Budokan (2009)
- Raw Like Sushi 114 (2015)
