= ...The Stories We Could Tell =

Studio album by Mr. Big
- Released: September 24, 2014
- Studio: New Century Media and THUD Studios, Los Angeles, California
- Genre: Hard rock
- Length: 61:34
- Label: WOWOW (Japan); Frontiers
- Producer: Pat Regan

Mr. Big chronology
What If... (2010)	...The Stories We Could Tell (2014)	Defying Gravity (2017)

Professional ratings
Review scores
Source	Rating
Blabbermouth.net	8/10
Classic Rock	3.5/5 stars
Metal Temple	9/10 stars
Rock Hard	8.0/10

...The Stories We Could Tell is the eighth studio album by American hard rock band Mr. Big, the second since their 2010 reunion album What If... It was recorded with producer Pat Regan (Kiss, Deep Purple, Warrant, Keel), and features 13 new songs. The European and Japanese editions of the album each include a bonus live recording of songs from the band's self-titled debut album. "Addicted to that Rush" appears on the European edition, while the Humble Pie cover "30 Days in the Hole" appears on the Japanese edition. The album was issued by Frontiers Records in the US and Europe. The album is Mr. Big's last to fully feature Pat Torpey on the drums, who was diagnosed with Parkinson's disease two months before its release. Torpey still featured on their next album, but didn't perform on most of the songs, being replaced by their additional drummer Matt Starr on several tracks. The album was released in Japan on September 24, 2014, and in the US and Europe on September 30, 2024.

== Track listing ==
No.	Title	Writer(s)	Length
1.	"Gotta Love the Ride"	Paul Gilbert, Eric Martin, André Pessis	4:28
2.	"I Forget to Breathe"	Gilbert, Billy Sheehan, Pat Torpey, Martin, Pessis	4:12
3.	"Fragile"	Martin, Pessis	4:37
4.	"Satisfied"	Gilbert, Sheehan, Torpey, Martin, Pessis	4:41
5.	"The Man Who Has Everything"	Martin, Pessis, Marti Frederiksen	3:58
6.	"The Monster in Me"	Gilbert, Sheehan, Torpey, Martin, Pessis	4:02
7.	"What If We Were New?"	Martin, Pessis	4:00
8.	"East/West"	Torpey, Lanny Cordola	4:29
9.	"The Light of Day"	Alex Dickson, Gilbert, Martin	3:22
10.	"Just Let Your Heart Decide"	Gilbert, James Dotson	4:19
11.	"It's Always About That Girl"	Gilbert, Sheehan, Torpey, Martin, Pessis, Tony Fanucchi	4:28
12.	"Cinderella Smile"	Gilbert, Sheehan, Torpey, Martin, Pessis	4:56
13.	"The Stories We Could Tell"	Gilbert, Sheehan, Martin, Pessis	4:00

Japanese Edition bonus track
No.	Title	Writer(s)	Length
14.	"30 Days in the Hole" (live; Humble Pie cover)	Steve Marriott	4:31

Japanese Bonus CD - 2014 re-recorded versions
No.	Title	Writer(s)	Length
1.	"Addicted to That Rush"	Sheehan, Gilbert, Torpey	4:36
2.	"Rock & Roll Over"	Martin	3:53
3.	"Daddy, Brother, Lover, Little Boy (The Electric Drill Song)"	Gilbert, Sheehan, Torpey, Martin, Pessis	3:51
4.	"Green-Tinted Sixties Mind"	Gilbert	3:36
5.	"Just Take My Heart"	Martin, Pessis	4:23
6.	"To Be with You"	Martin, David Grahame	3:24
7.	"Colorado Bulldog"	Gilbert, Sheehan, Torpey, Martin, Fanucchi	4:00
8.	"The Whole World's Gonna Know"	Sheehan, Gilbert	3:53
9.	"Take Cover"	Gilbert, Martin, Pessis	4:39
10.	"Out of the Underground"	Gilbert	4:06
Total length:			40:33

European Edition Bonus Track
No.	Title	Writer(s)	Length
14.	"Addicted to That Rush" (Live)	Sheehan, Gilbert, Torpey	4:31

== Personnel ==
Mr. Big

- Eric Martin – lead & backing vocals
- Paul Gilbert – guitar, backing vocals
- Billy Sheehan – bass guitar, backing vocals
- Pat Torpey – drum programming, percussion, backing vocals

Production

- Pat Regan – producer, engineer, orchestration
- Devin Kennedy-Pavelock – assistant engineer
- Larry Freemantle – art direction
- Larry Di Marzio, William Hames – photography

== Charts ==
Chart (2014)	Peak position
German Albums (Offizielle Top 100)	93
Japanese Albums (Oricon)	6
Swiss Albums (Schweizer Hitparade)	51
UK Independent Albums (OCC)	34
UK Rock & Metal Albums (OCC)	12
US Billboard 200	158
