= Take Cover (Mr. Big EP) =

EP by Mr. Big
- Released: 1996
- Recorded: 1992–1996
- Genre: Hard rock
- Label: East West; Atlantic

Take Cover is an extended play by American hard rock band Mr. Big. It was released in 1996 via East West/Atlantic.

The album contains two tracks ("Take Cover" and "Goin' Where the Wind Blows") from the band's fourth album Hey Man, a non-LP track "Shoot the Moon", a live version of their track "Just Take My Heart" from their 1991 album Lean into It, and a live version of their track "The Whole World's Gonna Know" from their 1993 album Bump Ahead. The song "Take Cover" was featured on the soundtrack album to Mega Man animated series.

== Track listing ==
No.	Title	Length
1.	"Take Cover"
2.	"Goin' Where the Wind Blows"
3.	"Shoot the Moon"
4.	"Just Take My Heart" (Live Version)
5.	"The Whole World's Gonna Know" (Live version)
