= Take Cover =

Take Cover may refer to:

- Take Cover (film), a 2024 British action thriller
- Take Cover (album), by Queensrÿche, 2007
- Take Cover (Mr. Big EP) or the title song, 1996
- Take Cover (Transplants EP), 2017
- Take Cover, an EP by Philmont, 2006
- "Take Cover", a song by Evanescence from The Bitter Truth, 2021

== See also ==
- Cover (disambiguation) § Military, anything that can provide physical protection from enemy fire
