= Wind Me Up =

Wind Me Up may refer to:

- "Wind Me Up (Let Me Go)", a 1965 song by Cliff Richard
- "Wind Me Up", a song by Mr Big from their self-titled album
- "Wind Me Up (Neville Nash song), a 1982 song by Neville Nash
