= Bass Frontiers Magazine =

American guitar magazine

Bass Frontiers Magazine is an online publication that specializes in coverage of bass guitar via video interviews, text articles, gear and media reviews, as well as the educational aspects of bass.

Bass Frontiers Magazine presently conducts video interviews for feature stories. Written articles, gear and media reviews, and other written content is contributed by bassists around the United States and globally. Brent Anthony Johnson is currently the magazine's main contributor. The magazine occasionally holds giveaways open to U.S. residents over the age of eighteen.

== History ==
Bass Frontiers Magazine was created in Nashville by Jim Hyatt in 1994. It initially began as a small newsletter circulated among a few hundred bassists. The publication quickly grew and became the second biggest bass publication at the time. In January 2008, Dave and Jonathan Fowler purchased the magazine from Jim Hyatt and decided to make it an online publication only. The magazine features artists such as Billy Sheehan, Rhonda Smith, Bunny Brunel, Leland Sklar, T.M. Stevens, Rickey Minor, Brian Bromberg, Don Felder, Felix Robinson, Victor Wooten, Les Claypool, Flea (musician), Chuck Rainey, Darryl Jones, Geddy Lee, Mark Hoppus, Gene Simmons, Stanley Clarke, Francis Rocco Prestia, Will Lee (bassist), and Randy Meisner.
