= Pat Torpey =

American drummer (1953–2018)

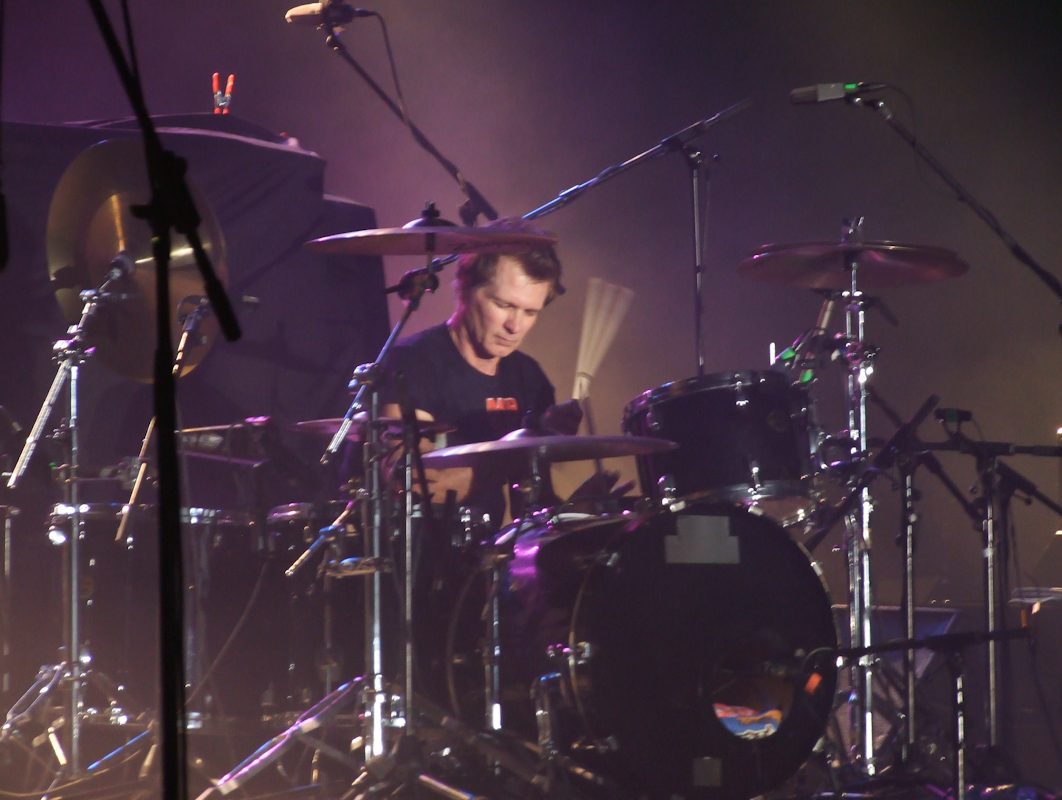
- Torpey in 2009

Background information
- Born: Patrick Allan Torpey; December 13, 1953; Painesville, Ohio, U.S.
- Died: February 7, 2018 (aged 64)
- Genres: Hard rock; progressive rock; pop rock; heavy metal
- Occupation: Drummer
- Instruments: Drums; vocals
- Years active: 1980–2018
- Formerly of: Mr. Big; Impellitteri; The Knack; Ted Nugent

Patrick Allan Torpey (December 13, 1953 – February 7, 2018) was an American musician, best known as the drummer for the rock band Mr. Big, as well as playing for other various singers and artists such as John Parr, Belinda Carlisle, Robert Plant, Montrose, Richie Kotzen and the Knack. Torpey also recorded with Impellitteri and Ted Nugent.

== Early years ==
Torpey was born in Painesville, Ohio, on December 13, 1953. He first became interested in drumming as a child after seeing a drummer in a polka band performing at a local picnic.

In high school, Torpey immersed himself in all available music programs, including concert, orchestra, marching and stage bands. About his teenage years, he said: "I wanted to play everything percussion, and I convinced my mother to buy me a used drum kit for my thirteenth birthday." His family moved to Phoenix, Arizona, where he began to hone his skills by playing in various local bands.

== Career ==
=== Beginnings: 1983–1988 ===
In 1983, Torpey moved to Los Angeles. He recounts the beginning of his career: "I'm a pretty good softball player and joined an entertainment league, and through that, I was able to make some new friends and network my way into a couple of gigs. I became a regular on the American Bandstand and Solid Gold TV shows performing with Ben E. King, Mike + The Mechanics, Melissa Manchester, Bob Geldof, and a few I can't even remember."

In 1985, Torpey successfully auditioned for the British pop-rock singer John Parr, who at the time had a #1 hit song, "St. Elmo's Fire", and had attained the opening slot for Tina Turner on her Private Dancer tour. When that tour ended he became the drummer for Belinda Carlisle on her first solo tour, opening for Robert Palmer.

Torpey further explains: "In 1987, I was doing a television show with Roger Daltrey and Bobby Colomby from Blood, Sweat and Tears approached me and asked me if I was available to do some studio work. Colomby was producing a couple of tracks for the Knack, and their original drummer had just left the band. I loved their music and what great fun for a drummer. They asked me to join the band."

=== Mr. Big: 1988–2002, 2009–2018 ===
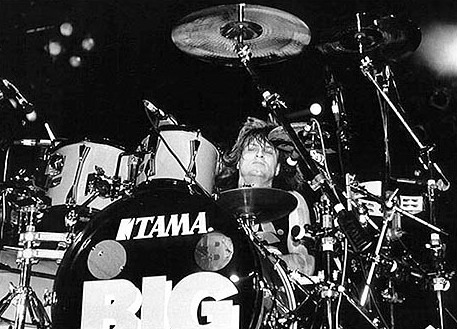
Torpey performing with Mr. Big

==== Rise to fame ====
While on tour with the Knack, Torpey was noticed by Billy Sheehan and Paul Gilbert, who were looking for a drummer for a new band. "I loved playing with the Knack but when Billy approached me I jumped at the chance."

Mr. Big secured a recording contract with Atlantic Records but before the band started work on the first CD, Torpey was tapped to play drums with Robert Plant on his Now and Zen tour when Plant's drummer Chris Blackwell was injured. "Led Zeppelin was such a huge influence and the guys in Mr. Big knew what a fantastic opportunity it was and they gave me their blessing. 'Communication Breakdown' every night, what a rush!!!"

Mr. Big band was initially successful in Japan, but achieved international stardom with the 1991 release of their second studio album Lean into It. This album featured the acoustic ballad "To Be with You" which received strong play on radio stations and MTV, rising to #1 on the Billboard Hot 100. For fourteen years Mr. Big toured the world, headlining as well as opening for Aerosmith, Rush, Bryan Adams, the Scorpions and others, garnering a reputation for their musicianship and live performances.

==== Reunion ====
In January 2009, Torpey reunited with his old Mr. Big bandmates Eric Martin, Paul Gilbert and Billy Sheehan for a reunion tour. In 2010, they recorded and released the album What If... with producer Kevin Shirley. 2011 saw them back together for a world tour supporting the new album.

He continued to tour and record with the band through two more albums, ...The Stories We Could Tell (2014) and Defying Gravity (2017). Although health problems (specifically Parkinson's disease) hampered his involvement in later days, he remained very much a part of the band up through his death in 2018.

=== Solo work and other projects: 2002–2018 ===
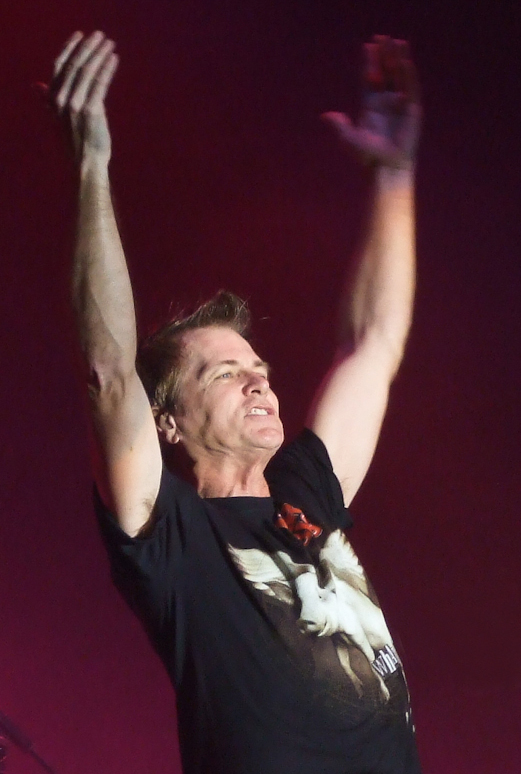
Torpey in 2011

Torpey had been noted as an accomplished backing vocalist with an extensive vocal range, often singing cover songs in the Mr. Big show during his encore, including singing Beatles songs during his drum solo. Due to Mr. Big's popularity in Japan and Asia, Torpey released two solo albums for the Japanese market in collaboration with Lanny Cordola and Chuck Wright, 1998's Odd Man Out and 1999's Odd Man Out: Y2K. Several tracks from these albums were reworked from Cordola and Wright's previous band Chaos Is The Poetry.

Torpey played for the reformed version of Montrose; the "new" band stepped up for a memorable debut performance at the Los Angeles Key Club on April 29, 2002, in honour of Ozzy Osbourne and Mötley Crüe drummer Randy Castillo.

In 2004, he toured with Richie Kotzen as a drummer for his UK club tour and South American leg; he also played with Billy Sheehan on Johnny Hiland's first self-titled album, Johnny Hiland. Torpey returned to the Knack in the same year.

At the end of 2006, Torpey joined "The Exile Social Club", a band that relives old rock 'n' roll hits and includes Chuck Wright from Quiet Riot, Jason Hook, and David Victor.

Torpey had been involved in live performances at clinics for Tama Drums in Japan, Russia, China, Indonesia, Philippines and many other parts of the world. Torpey has two instructional videos, Big Drums (performing several Mr. Big songs with Billy Sheehan) and Rock Groove Drumming, showing his approach to paradiddles, grace notes, heel-toe technique, and very fast triplets and double strokes with feet. Both provide insight into his drum parts on Mr. Big songs ("Addicted to That Rush", "Temperamental", "Mr. Gone", "Take Cover" and "Colorado Bulldog").

== Parkinson's disease diagnosis and death ==
He announced on July 25, 2014, that he had been diagnosed with Parkinson's disease and would be unable to perform all of his normal drumming duties on the band's 2014–15 world tour in support of the album ...The Stories We Could Tell.

"I've been dealing with Parkinson's symptoms for the past couple of years and only recently received a confirmed diagnosis as symptoms worsened," Torpey said. "I intend to fight the disease with the same intensity and tenacity that I drum and live my life by and will continue recording and performing, as always, to the best of my ability."

Torpey acted as a "drum producer" on Mr. Big's 2017 album, Defying Gravity, also contributing drums and percussion to some tracks on the record, and playing percussion on tour, though Matt Starr had mostly taken over lead drummer duties at that point.

Torpey died from complications of Parkinson's disease at the age of 64 on February 7, 2018.

== Discography ==
=== Solo ===
- Odd Man Out (1998)
- Odd Man Out: Y2K (1999)

=== with Impellitteri ===
- Stand in Line (1988)

=== with Mr. Big ===
- Mr. Big (1989)
- Lean into It (1991)
- Bump Ahead (1993)
- Hey Man (1996)
- Get Over It (1999)
- Actual Size (2001)
- What If... (2011)
- ...The Stories We Could Tell (2014)
- Defying Gravity (2017)

=== with The Knack ===
- Normal as the Next Guy (2001)

=== Session and guest appearances ===
- Jeff Paris – Race to Paradise (1986)
- Stan Bush & Barrage – Stan Bush & Barrage (1987)
- Mötley Crüe – Girls, Girls, Girls (1987)
- Ted Nugent – If You Can't Lick 'Em...Lick 'Em (1988)
- Razor Baby – Too Hot to Handle (1988)
- Michael Thompson Band – How Long (1989)
- Andrew Ridgeley – Son of Albert (1990)
- Frederiksen/Phillips – Frederiksen/Phillips (1995)
- Akira Takasaki – Wa (1996)
- Honey – Paradise (1997)
- Paul Gilbert – King of Clubs (1998)
- Niacin – High Bias (1998)
- Velocity – Impact (1998)
- Richie Kotzen – What Is... (1998)
- Stream – Nothing Is Sacred (1999)
- Velocity – Activator (2001)
- Hideki – Punk Drunker (2002)
- Richie Kotzen – Change (2003)
- Johnny Hiland – Johnny Hiland (2004)
- Chuck Wright's Sheltering Sky – Chuck Wright's Sheltering Sky (2022)
