= Get Over It (album) =

Studio album by Mr. Big
- Released: September 15, 1999 (Japan); March 21, 2000 (US)
- Studios: Sound Image Studios, Van Nuys, California
- Genres: Hard rock; blues rock; funk rock
- Length: 45:19
- Label: Atlantic
- Producer: Pat Regan

Mr. Big chronology
Hey Man (1996)	Get Over It (1999)	Actual Size (2001)

Singles from Get Over It
- 1. "Superfantastic" Released: September 15, 1999 (Japan only)

Professional ratings
Review scores
Source	Rating
AllMusic	3/5 stars
Collector's Guide to Heavy Metal	8/10
Rock Hard	5.0/10

Get Over It is the fifth studio album by American hard rock band Mr. Big, released in Japan on 15 September 1999 and in the United States on 21 March 2000. It was the band's first studio album to feature guitarist Richie Kotzen, following the departure of former guitarist Paul Gilbert. With Kotzen's arrival, the band explored a new musical direction while retaining elements of their established sound.

== Background ==
Get Over It was released approximately three years after the band's previous album, Hey Man (1996). Following the departure of original guitarist Paul Gilbert in 1997, the band recruited Richie Kotzen as his replacement. Kotzen had previously been a member of Poison and had also pursued a solo career. In addition to playing guitar, he contributed to songwriting and vocals after joining the band.

Kotzen's arrival also brought changes to the band's musical direction. Vocalist Eric Martin praised the new perspective he brought to the studio, explaining that the recording sessions were conducted in a more spontaneous manner than those for the band's previous albums. Bassist Billy Sheehan also recalled that digital recording provided considerable freedom during the production process. Pat Regan handled the album's production, engineering and mixing, while recording took place at Sound Image Studios in Van Nuys, California.

Musically, Get Over It retained Mr. Big's established melodic hard rock sound while incorporating elements of blues rock and soul influenced by Kotzen. According to a retrospective article by Louder, the two albums featuring Kotzen pursued a sound more oriented towards adult-oriented rock and FM radio than the band's earlier releases. Billboard described the lead single "Superfantastic" as a satirical song about contemporary society, while an Atlantic Records representative characterized it as being closer to pop and adult-oriented music than conventional hard rock.

The album was released first in Japan, where the Japanese edition included the bonus track "Water Over the Bridge". On 4 December 1999, Billboard reported that the album had sold more than 200,000 copies in Japan following its release. In the United States, it was released the following March through Atlantic Records.

== Track listing ==
No.	Title	Writer(s)	Length
1.	"Electrified"	Richie Kotzen, Eric Martin, Billy Sheehan, Pat Torpey	4:12
2.	"Static"	Kotzen	3:07
3.	"Hiding Place"	Kotzen, Sheehan, Torpey	4:46
4.	"Superfantastic"	Martin, André Pessis	3:45
5.	"A Rose Alone"	Martin, Pessis, Marti Frederiksen	3:52
6.	"Hole in the Sun"	Martin, Pessis, Frederiksen	3:46
7.	"How Does It Feel"	Kotzen, Sheehan, Torpey	4:14
8.	"Try to Do Without It"	Martin, Pessis, Kotzen	4:54
9.	"Dancin' with My Devils"	Martin, Pessis, Kotzen	3:43
10.	"Mr. Never in a Million Years"	Kotzen, Sheehan, Torpey	5:40
11.	"My New Religion"	Martin, Pessis	3:20

Japanese edition bonus track
No.	Title	Writer(s)	Length
12.	"Water Over the Bridge"	Martin, Pessis, Frederiksen	3:32
Total length:			48:51

== Personnel ==
Mr. Big

- Eric Martin – lead & backing vocals
- Richie Kotzen – guitars, backing vocals, co-lead vocals on "Static"
- Billy Sheehan – bass guitar, backing vocals
- Pat Torpey – drums, backing vocals

Production

- Pat Regan – producer, engineer, mixing
- Brad Vance – mastering

== Charts ==
Chart (1999)	Peak position
Japanese Albums (Oricon)	5

== Certifications ==
Region	Certification	Certified units/sales
Japan (RIAJ)	Gold	100,000^{^}
^{^} Shipments figures based on certification alone.
