= Montparnasse derailment =

1895 train accident in Paris, France

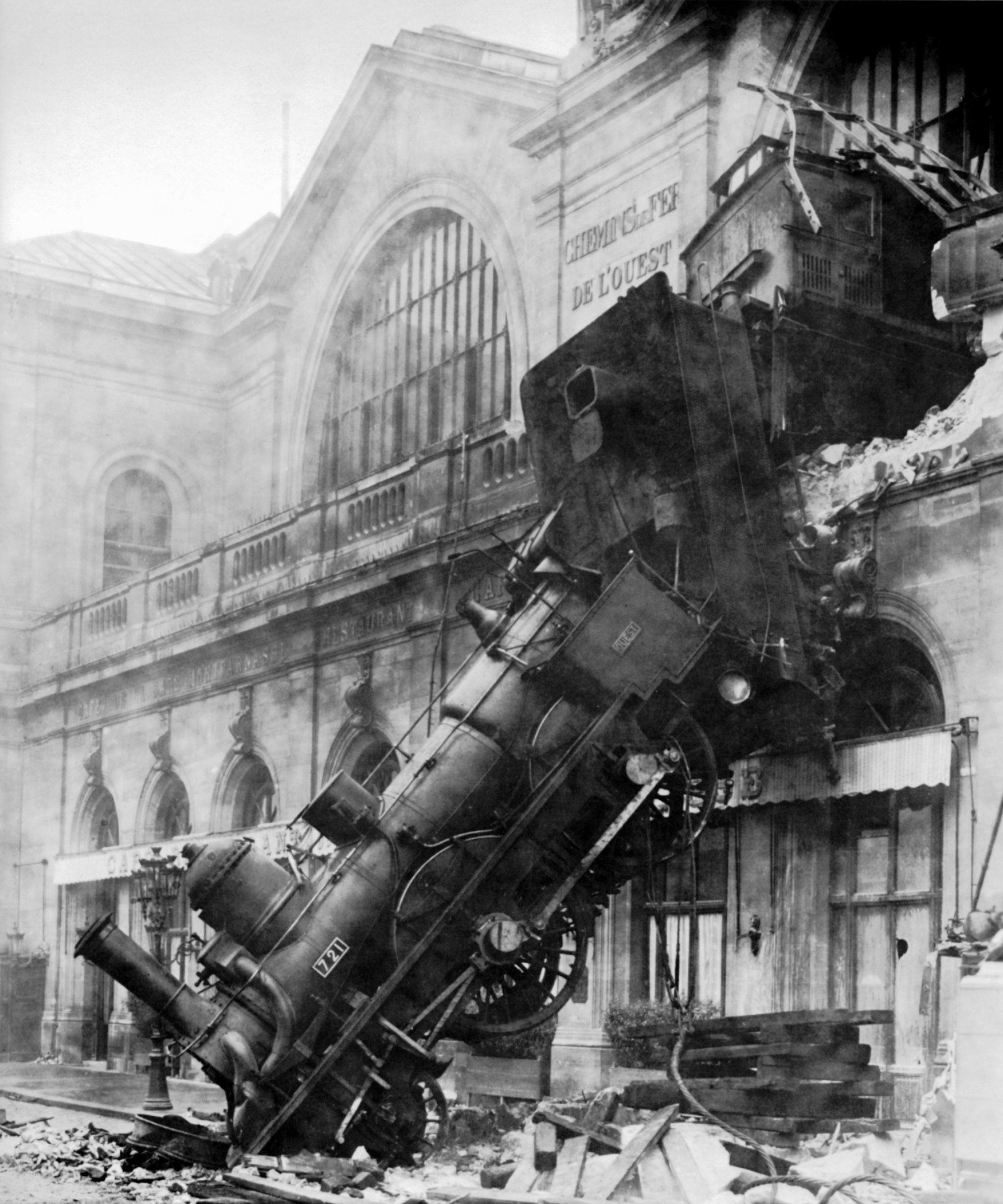
- The wreckage of the station, photographed by Studio Lévy

Details
- Date: 22 October 1895; 131 years ago 16:00
- Location: Paris Montparnasse
- Coordinates: 48°50′24″N 2°19′07″E
- Country: France
- Operator: Chemins de fer de l'Ouest
- Incident type: Overrun
- Cause: Excess speed and braking failure

Statistics
- Trains: 1
- Passengers: 131
- Pedestrians: 6
- Deaths: 1
- Injured: 5

The Granville–Paris Express overran the buffer stop and derailed at its Gare Montparnasse terminus at 16:00 on 22 October 1895. With the train several minutes late and the driver trying to make up for lost time, the train approached the station too quickly and the driver's application of the railway air brake was ineffective.

After running through the buffer stop, the train crossed the station concourse and crashed through the station wall. The locomotive fell onto the Place de Rennes below, where it stood on its nose. Although all passengers survived, a woman in the street below was killed by falling masonry.

== Derailment ==
On 22 October 1895, the Granville to Paris express, operated by Chemins de fer de l'Ouest, was made up of steam locomotive No. 721 (a type 2-4-0, French notation 120) hauling three luggage vans, a post van, and six passenger coaches. The train had left Granville on time at 08:45, but was several minutes late as it approached its Montparnasse terminus with 131 passengers on board. In an effort to make up lost time, the train approached the station faster than usual, at a speed of 40–60 km/h (25–37 mph), and when the driver attempted to apply the Westinghouse air brake, it was faulty or ineffective. The locomotive brakes alone were insufficient to stop the train, the momentum carried it into the buffers, and the locomotive crossed the almost 30-metre (98 ft) wide station concourse, crashing through a 60-centimetre (24 in) thick wall, before falling onto the Place de Rennes 10 metres (33 ft) below, where it stood on its nose.

A woman in the street below, Marie-Augustine Aguillard, was killed by falling masonry. She had been standing in for her husband, a newspaper vendor, while he went to collect the evening newspapers. Two passengers, a fireman, two guards, and a passerby in the street sustained injuries.

== Aftermath ==
The locomotive driver was sentenced to two months in prison and fined 50 francs (equivalent to €270 in 2025; the average daily wage in Paris at the time was around 6 francs) for approaching the station too quickly. One of the guards was fined 25 francs as he had been preoccupied with paperwork and failed to apply the handbrake. These fines and sentences were later suspended.

The railway company settled with the family of the deceased woman, and arranged for the education of her two young children, as well as proposing future employment for them. These offers were rescinded when it was revealed that she was not legally married to the man with whom she was living, but rather he was married to another woman, and there is no evidence of the company supporting the boys.

The passenger carriages were undamaged and were easily removed. It took 48 hours before the legal process and investigation allowed the railway to start removing the locomotive and tender. An attempt was made to move the locomotive with 14 horses, but this failed. A 250 tonne winch, with 10 men, first lowered the locomotive to the ground and then lifted the tender back into the station. When the locomotive reached the railway workshops, it was found to have suffered little damage.

== Legacy ==
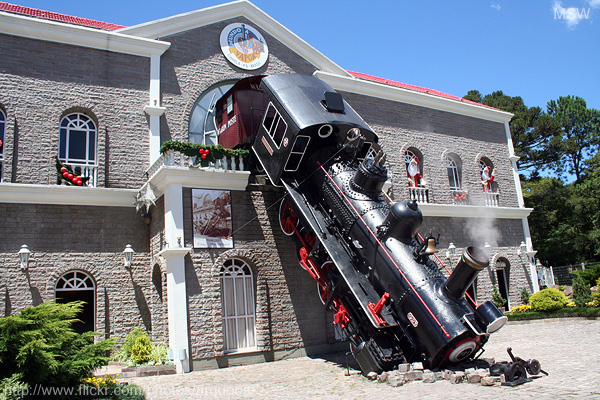
Reconstruction at Mundo a Vapor theme park in Brazil

The wreckage remained outside the station for several days and a number of photographs were taken, such as those attributed to Studio Lévy and Sons, L. Mercier, and Henri Roger-Viollet.

The Lévy and Sons photograph has become one of the most famous in transportation history.

== In popular culture ==
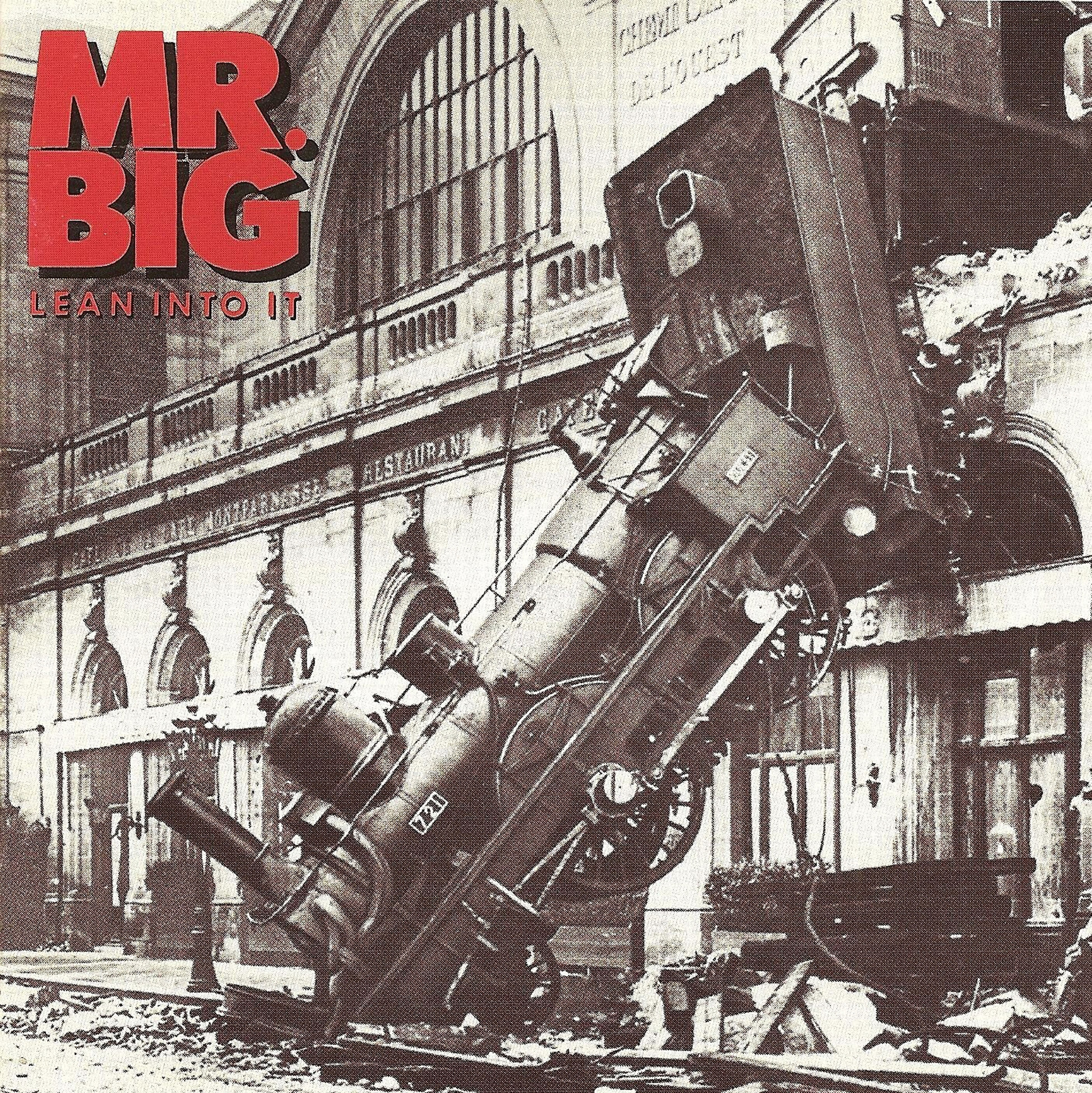
The photograph of the wreckage featured on the cover of the Mr. Big album Lean into It

The Lévy and Sons photograph is now in the public domain and was used as the cover page in the book An Introduction to Error Analysis by John Taylor. It is also on the cover of On This Day in History Sh!t Went Down by James Fell. The photograph is featured on the album covers for Lean into It by American rock band Mr. Big and Scrabbling at the Lock by Dutch rock band The Ex with Tom Cora, both first released in 1991, and the 2019 album Warranty Void If Removed by French recording artist Dial-up Jeremy.

The incident is featured during a dream sequence in the 2007 novel The Invention of Hugo Cabret and its 2011 film adaptation, Hugo. It is depicted in the comic book series The Extraordinary Adventures of Adèle Blanc-Sec, in the 1978 fourth album Momies en folie.

The incident was the basis for the 2025 novel The Paris Express: A Novel by Emma Donoghue.

A train crash with a similar chain of events occurs in a 1998 (fifth series) episode of Thomas & Friends called "A Better View for Gordon", in which Gordon the Big Engine crashed through a new station due to faulty brakes.

== See also ==
- 1900 Harcourt Street train crash
- 1953 Pennsylvania Railroad train wreck
- Gare de Lyon rail accident
- O'Hare station train crash
- Rotterdam metro crash

== Sources ==
- Richou, G. (9 November 1895). "L'Accident de la Gare Montparnasse". La Nature (in French). No. 1171.
