= Just Take My Heart (song) =

1992 single by Mr. Big

Single by Mr. Big

from the album Lean into It
- Released: April 1992
- Length: 4:23
- Label: Atlantic
- Songwriters: Eric Martin; André Pessis
- Producer: Kevin Elson

Mr. Big singles chronology
"To Be with You" (1991)	"Just Take My Heart" (1992)	"Wild World" (1993)

Music video
- "Just Take My Heart" on YouTube

"Just Take My Heart" is a song by American rock band Mr. Big, released in April 1992 by Atlantic Records, as the fourth and final single from their second studio album, Lean into It (1991). The song is written by Eric Martin and André Pessis, and produced by Kevin Elson. It peaked at numbers nine and 16 on the US Cash Box Top 100 and Billboard Hot 100 charts. In the UK, the song reached number 26 on the UK Singles Chart. It also became a top-20 hit in Canada, Finland, Ireland, the Netherlands, and Switzerland.

== Music video ==
The music video for "Just Take My Heart" was shot on February 27, 1992, in Chicago. It includes shots of the band walking around a dim warehouse with candles and flashes of women on the screen.

== Personnel ==
- Eric Martin – lead vocals
- Paul Gilbert – guitar, backing vocals
- Billy Sheehan – six-string bass, backing vocals
- Pat Torpey – drums, percussion

== Charts ==
=== Weekly charts ===
Chart (1992)	Peak position
Australia (ARIA)	27
Belgium (Ultratop 50 Flanders)	26
Canada Top Singles (RPM)	16
Europe (Eurochart Hot 100)	75
Finland (Suomen virallinen lista)	10
Germany (GfK)	29
Ireland (IRMA)	18
Netherlands (Dutch Top 40)	16
Netherlands (Single Top 100)	17
New Zealand (Recorded Music NZ)	40
Sweden (Sverigetopplistan)	35
Switzerland (Schweizer Hitparade)	20
UK Singles (Official Charts)	26
UK Airplay (Music Week)	38
US Billboard Hot 100	16
US Album Rock Tracks (Billboard)	18
US Cash Box Top 100	9

=== Year-end charts ===
Chart (1992)	Position
US Billboard Hot 100	95

== Release history ==
Region	Date	Format(s)	Label(s)	Ref.
United States	April 1992	7-inch vinyl; CD; cassette	Atlantic	
United Kingdom	May 4, 1992	7-inch vinyl; CD; cassette	Atlantic	
Japan	May 25, 1992	CD	Atlantic	
Australia	May 27, 1992	CD; cassette	Atlantic	
