= Green-Tinted Sixties Mind =

Single by Mr. Big

from the album Lean into It
- A-side: "To Be with You"
- Released: November 1, 1991
- Recorded: 1990
- Genre: Hard rock; psychedelic rock
- Length: 3:30
- Label: Atlantic
- Songwriter: Paul Gilbert
- Producer: Kevin Elson

Mr. Big singles chronology
"Addicted to That Rush" (1989)	"Green-Tinted Sixties Mind" (1991)	"To Be with You" (1992)

"Green-Tinted Sixties Mind" is a song by American supergroup Mr. Big. It was released in November 1991 as the lead single from their second album Lean into It.

== Background and writing ==
The liner notes from the songs' parent album suggest the inspiration for the song as follows,

"Did you ever notice how old movies from the sixties have sort of a green tint to them? Strange but true."

== Content ==
Written by guitarist virtuoso Paul Gilbert, the lyrics concern an old-fashioned girl, living as if she were in the 1960s. The intro of the song is very recognizable due to Gilbert's two-handed tapping riff.

== Music video ==
Though released as a b-side track, the song was promoted by a music video of the band playing the song with female dancers executing a choreography. Model Kristine Rose was among them.

== Cover versions ==
- The song was covered by Indonesian female solo artist Mulan Jameela on her 2008 debut album Mulan Jameela.
- In 2013, Japanese alternative pop group Man with a Mission released a cover of this song on their Database single.

== Charts ==
Chart (1991-92)	Peak position
UK Singles (The Official Charts Company)	72
US Billboard Mainstream Rock Tracks	33
