= Deep (Niacin album) =

Studio album by Niacin
- Released: 7 March 2000
- Genre: Jazz rock, Progressive rock
- Length: 65:37
- Label: Magna Cart
- Producer: Billy Sheehan, John Novello

Niacin chronology
| Live! - Blood, Sweat & Beers (1998) | Deep (2000) | Time Crunch (2001) |

Professional ratings
Review scores
| Source | Rating |
|---|---|
| Allmusic | 2.5/5 stars |

Deep is the third studio album from the jazz rock fusion trio Niacin, released in March 2000.

The album is heavily loaded with Billy Sheehan's powerful bass solos and features contributions from guest musicians Glenn Hughes on vocals and Steve Lukather on guitar.

== Track listing ==
1. "Swing Swang Swung" - 3:48
2. "Best Laid Plans" - 4:26
3. "Sugar Blues" - 5:50
4. "Stompin' Ground" - 5:03
5. "Blue Mondo" - 5:56
6. "Panic Button" - 5:37
7. "Bootleg Jeans" - 7:00
8. "Mean Streets" - 5:37
9. "This One's Called..." - 3:46
10. "Klunkified "- 2:58
11. "Ratta McQue" - 3:48
12. "Things Ain't Like They Used to Be" - 7:25
13. "Bluesion" - 4:18

== Personnel ==
=== Musicians ===
- Billy Sheehan - bass.
- Dennis Chambers - drums.
- John Novello - piano, Fender Rhodes, Hammond B-3 organ, synthesizers.

=== Guest musicians ===
- Glenn Hughes - vocals.
- Steve Lukather - guitar.
