= Bump Ahead =

Studio album by Mr. Big
- Released: September 21, 1993
- Recorded: 1993
- Studios: Rumbo (Los Angeles); Fantasy (Berkeley)
- Genre: Hard rock
- Length: 44:41
- Label: Atlantic
- Producer: Kevin Elson

Mr. Big chronology
Lean into It (1991)	Bump Ahead (1993)	Hey Man (1996)

Singles from Bump Ahead
- 1. "Wild World" Released: October 1993; 2. "Ain't Seen Love Like That" Released: February 1994

Professional ratings
Review scores
Source	Rating
AllMusic	3/5 stars
Collector's Guide to Heavy Metal	6/10
Entertainment Weekly	B
Music Week	4/5 stars
Rock Hard	8.5/10

Bump Ahead is the third studio album by American hard rock band Mr. Big, released on 21 September 1993 through Atlantic Records. It followed the band's second studio album, Lean into It (1991), and continued its musical approach of combining hard rock foundations with an emphasis on melody. On the album, Mr. Big showcased music built around the interplay between guitar performances and vocals. It also featured "Wild World", which would later become one of the band's signature songs.

== Background ==
Mr. Big achieved commercial success with the release of their second studio album, Lean into It, in 1991. The album's single "To Be with You" reached number one on the US Billboard Hot 100, earning the band international recognition. Their third studio album, Bump Ahead, released in 1993, was produced following this success and continued the band's melodic approach to hard rock and pop metal.

Bump Ahead was recorded in 1993 at Fantasy Studios in Berkeley, California, and Rumbo Recorders in Canoga Park, near Los Angeles. Kevin Elson served as the producer, with Tom Size contributing to the mixing process. Elson and Bob Ludwig handled the mastering. The album featured the band's lineup at the time, consisting of vocalist Eric Martin, guitarist Paul Gilbert, bassist Billy Sheehan, and drummer Pat Torpey.

Musically, the album features a variety of moods and styles rooted in guitar-driven hard rock and pop metal. Gilbert's guitar playing and Sheehan's bass work form key elements of the band's sound, while Martin's vocals are particularly prominent on the melody-oriented tracks. The album includes both original compositions written by the band and reinterpretations of songs by other artists.

The track "Wild World" is a cover of a song written and originally performed by British singer-songwriter Cat Stevens. Mr. Big's version retains the original melody while incorporating the band's distinctive rock arrangement. It was released as one of the album's principal singles and has since been cited as one of its key tracks in material introducing the album.

== Track listing ==
No.	Title	Writer(s)	Length
1.	"Colorado Bulldog"	Paul Gilbert, Billy Sheehan, Pat Torpey, Eric Martin, Tony Fanucchi	4:13
2.	"Price You Gotta Pay"	Sheehan, Gilbert, Torpey	3:56
3.	"Promise Her the Moon"	Martin, André Pessis	4:07
4.	"What's It Gonna Be"	Gilbert, Torpey, Pessis, Sheehan	3:57
5.	"Wild World" (Cat Stevens cover)	Cat Stevens	3:28
6.	"Mr. Gone"	Torpey, Gilbert, Sheehan	4:33
7.	"The Whole World's Gonna Know"	Gilbert, Sheehan	3:52
8.	"Nothing but Love"	Gilbert	3:46
9.	"Temperamental"	Martin, Gilbert, Fanucchi, Torpey	4:55
10.	"Ain't Seen Love Like That"	Martin, Mark Spiro, Pessis	3:32
11.	"Mr. Big" (Free cover)	Andy Fraser, Paul Rodgers, Paul Kossoff, Simon Kirke	4:25

Japanese edition bonus track
No.	Title	Writer(s)	Length
12.	"Long Way Down"	Martin, Pessis, Torpey, Sheehan, Gilbert	3:48
Total length:			48:29

2009 remastered digital edition bonus tracks
No.	Title	Writer(s)	Length
12.	"Long Way Down"	Martin, Pessis, Torpey, Sheehan, Gilbert	3:48
13.	"Ain't Seen Love Like That" (Demo)	Martin, Spiro, Pessis	4:39
14.	"Mr. Big" (Demo; originally recorded by Free)	Fraser, Rodgers, Kossoff, Kirke	4:16
Total length:			57:24

== Personnel ==
Mr. Big

- Eric Martin – lead vocals
- Paul Gilbert – guitar, backing vocals
- Billy Sheehan – bass, backing vocals
- Pat Torpey – drums, backing vocals

Additional musicians

- Little John Chrisley – harmonica on "Price You Gotta Pay"

Production

- Kevin Elson – producer, engineer, mixing, mastering
- Andy Udoff, Stephen Hart, Dick Kaneshiro, Michael Semanick – assistant engineers
- Tom Size – mixing
- Bob Ludwig – mastering
- Melanie Nissen – art direction
- Reisig and Taylor – photography, images

== Charts ==
Chart (1993)	Peak position
Australian Albums (ARIA)	119
Austrian Albums (Ö3 Austria)	22
Finnish Albums (The Official Finnish Charts)	30
German Albums (Offizielle Top 100)	39
Japanese Albums (Oricon)	4
Swiss Albums (Schweizer Hitparade)	16
Swedish Albums (Sverigetopplistan)	36
UK Albums (Official Charts)	61
US Billboard 200	82

== Certifications ==
Region	Certification	Certified units/sales
Japan (RIAJ)	Platinum	200,000^{^}
^{^} Shipments figures based on certification alone.
