= What If... (Mr. Big album) =

Studio album by Mr. Big
- Released: December 15, 2010 (Japan)
- Recorded: September–October 2010
- Studio: The Village Recorder, Los Angeles, California, The Cave, Malibu, California
- Genre: Hard rock
- Length: 46:38
- Label: WHD/Victor (Japan), Frontiers (Europe)
- Producer: Kevin Shirley

Mr. Big chronology
Actual Size (2001)	What If... (2010)	...The Stories We Could Tell (2014)

Singles from What If...
- 1. "Undertow" Released: November 27, 2010; 2. "All the Way Up" Released: May 12, 2011

Professional ratings
Review scores
Source	Rating
AllMusic	2.5/5 stars
Rock Hard	8.0/10

What If... is the seventh full-length studio album by the American rock band Mr. Big, which was released on December 15, 2010, through Frontiers Records. It was the band's first album since their 2009 reunion, their first album in 10 years since 2001's Actual Size and their first album with the original line-up featuring guitarist Paul Gilbert since 1996's Hey Man.

The album was recorded between September–October 2010 in a Los Angeles-area studio with producer Kevin Shirley (Iron Maiden, Aerosmith, Rush, Black Country Communion).

The first single from the album, "Undertow", was released on November 27, 2010. A music video was filmed for the single and featured on the special edition DVD of the album. The album was supported by a world tour in 2011.

== Track listing ==
No.	Title	Writer(s)	Length
1.	"Undertow"	Eric Martin, Paul Gilbert, Billy Sheehan, Pat Torpey, Kevin Dotson	4:49
2.	"American Beauty"	Martin, Gilbert, Sheehan, Torpey	3:44
3.	"Stranger in My Life"	Martin, Gilbert, Sheehan, Torpey, André Pessis	4:26
4.	"Nobody Left to Blame"	Martin, Gilbert, Sheehan, Torpey	4:20
5.	"Still Ain't Enough for Me"	Martin, Gilbert, Sheehan, Torpey	3:04
6.	"Once Upon a Time"	Martin, Gilbert, Sheehan, Torpey	4:03
7.	"As Far as I Can See"	Martin, Gilbert, Sheehan, Torpey, Dotson	3:55
8.	"All the Way Up"	Martin, Gilbert, Sheehan, Torpey, Dotson	5:12
9.	"I Won't Get in My Way"	Martin, Gilbert, Sheehan, Torpey, Pessis	4:40
10.	"Around the World"	Martin, Gilbert, Sheehan, Torpey, Dotson	3:51
11.	"I Get the Feeling"	Martin, Gilbert, Sheehan, Torpey	4:34

Japanese & Korean edition bonus track
No.	Title	Writer(s)	Length
12.	"Kill Me with a Kiss"	Martin, Gilbert, Sheehan, Torpey, Pessis	5:59

European & American edition bonus track
No.	Title	Writer(s)	Length
12.	"Unforgiven"	Martin, Gilbert, Sheehan, Torpey	4:16

== Personnel ==
Mr. Big

- Eric Martin – lead vocals
- Paul Gilbert – guitar, vocals
- Billy Sheehan – bass guitar, vocals
- Pat Torpey – drums, percussion, vocals

Production

- Kevin Shirley – producer, mixing
- Vanessa Parr – engineer at Village Recorders
- Jared Kvitka – engineer at The Cave
- Steve Hall – mastering at Future Disc, Los Angeles

== Charts ==
Chart (2011)	Peak position
Austrian Albums (Ö3 Austria)	71
French Albums (SNEP)	171
German Albums (Offizielle Top 100)	50
Italian Albums (FIMI)	71
Japanese Albums (Oricon)	7
Swiss Albums (Schweizer Hitparade)	36
UK Independent Albums (OCC)	11

== Release history ==
Country	Release date	Label	Catalog
Japan	December 15, 2010	WHD Entertainment, Victor Entertainment	IECP-10240 (CD), IEZP-26 (Dual Disc - CD+DVD)
Europe	January 21, 2011	Frontiers Records	
United States	February 8, 2011	Frontiers Records	
Korea	February 18, 2011	LOEN Entertainment	
Hong Kong	March 18, 2011	Evosound	EVSA-123A
