= Defying Gravity (Mr. Big album) =

2017 studio album by Mr. Big

Studio album by Mr. Big
- Released: July 7, 2017
- Studio: Ocean Studios (Burbank, California); Assembly Room Studios (Los Angeles); Salamander Sound (Fairfax, California)
- Genre: Hard rock; blues rock; folk rock
- Length: 47:57
- Label: Frontiers
- Producer: Kevin Elson

Mr. Big chronology
...The Stories We Could Tell (2014)	Defying Gravity (2017)	Ten (2024)

Singles from Defying Gravity
- 1. "Everybody Needs a Little Trouble" Released: June 5, 2017; 2. "Defying Gravity" Released: July 14, 2017

Professional ratings
Review scores
Source	Rating
Classic Rock	3/5 stars
Metal Rules	4.0/5
Rock Hard	7.5/10

Defying Gravity is the ninth studio album from American hard rock band Mr. Big. It is their only album to feature drumming contributions from Matt Starr, who had been filling in since 2014, as founding member Pat Torpey was unable to play on most songs due to his Parkinson's disease diagnosis, but performs drums and backing vocals on select tracks and is credited as "drum producer". Defying Gravity was Torpey's final studio appearance prior to his death on February 7, 2018, and consequently the final release to feature the band's original lineup.

== Track listing ==
All tracks are written by Mr. Big.

No.	Title	Length
1.	"Open Your Eyes"	4:01
2.	"Defying Gravity"	5:27
3.	"Everybody Needs a Little Trouble"	3:52
4.	"Damn I'm in Love Again"	2:55
5.	"Mean to Me"	3:28
6.	"Nothing Bad (Bout Feeling Good)"	4:00
7.	"Forever and Back"	3:39
8.	"She's All Coming Back to Me Now"	4:21
9.	"1992"	5:00
10.	"Nothing at All"	4:12
11.	"Be Kind"	7:02
Total length:		47:57

Japanese edition bonus track
No.	Title	Length
12.	"Defying Gravity" (radio edit)	4:30

== Personnel ==
Mr. Big

- Eric Martin – lead vocals
- Paul Gilbert – guitar, backing vocals
- Billy Sheehan – bass guitar, backing vocals
- Pat Torpey – drum producer, backing vocals, drums

Additional musicians

- Matt Starr – drums, percussion

Production

- Kevin Elson – producer, engineer, mixing
- Greg Foeller – assistant engineer
- Kevin Cofield – additional recording engineer
- Chris Manning – lead vocals producer and engineer
- Giovanni Murrillo, Ari Blitz – mixing assistants
- Dave Collins – mastering
- Larry Freemantle – art direction
- William Hames, Jason Quigley, Larry Dimarzio – photography

== Charts ==
Chart (2017)	Peak position
Belgian Albums (Ultratop Flanders)	157
Belgian Albums (Ultratop Wallonia)	112
Dutch Albums (Album Top 100)	125
German Albums (Offizielle Top 100)	65
Japanese Albums (Oricon)	9
Scottish Albums (OCC)	60
Swiss Albums (Schweizer Hitparade)	32
UK Rock & Metal Albums (OCC)	9
