= Wild World (song) =

1971 single by Cat Stevens

- A-side label of the US/Canada single

Single by Cat Stevens

from the album Tea for the Tillerman
- B-side: "Miles from Nowhere" (USA and Canada); "Sad Lisa" (Germany)
- Released: January 1971 (US)
- Recorded: July 1970
- Genre: Folk rock
- Length: 3:15
- Label: Island (UK/Europe); A&M (US/Canada)
- Songwriter: Cat Stevens
- Producer: Paul Samwell-Smith

Cat Stevens singles chronology
| "Father and Son" (1970) | "Wild World" (1971) | "Moonshadow" (1971) |

Alternative cover
- German cover

Official audio
- "Wild World" on YouTube

"Wild World" is a song written and recorded by English singer-songwriter Cat Stevens. It first appeared on his fourth album, Tea for the Tillerman (1970). Released as a single in September 1970 by Island Records and A&M Records, "Wild World" saw significant commercial success, garnering attention for its themes of love and heartbreak, and has been covered numerous times since its release. Jimmy Cliff, Maxi Priest and Mr. Big (released in 1971, 1988, and 1993 respectively) had successful cover versions of the song.

Stevens called "Wild World" his "parting song" with his then-girlfriend Patti D'Arbanville, though in a separate, prior interview he stated it was not written about someone specific and it was rather his own reflection on life.

Upon release, the song was criticized by some for alleged misogynism. Subsequent re-recordings by Stevens omit the word "girl", as well as the line "don't be a bad girl".

== Overview ==
Stevens developed a relationship with actress Patti D'Arbanville and the two were a pair for some time. Many have speculated that this song was based on or inspired in part by this relationship. In an 2009 interview on The Chris Isaak Hour, Stevens denied the rumors, stating:

"I was trying to relate to my life. I was at the point where it was beginning to happen and I was myself going into the world. I'd done my career before, and I was sort of warning myself to be careful this time around, because it was happening. It was not me writing about somebody specific, although other people may have informed the song, but it was more about me. It's talking about losing touch with home and reality - home especially."

However, Stevens contradicted his previous statement in a 2019 interview on Billboard:

“'Wild World' was really my parting song with my girlfriend Patti D’Arbanville. We’d had some great times together, but I started recording and she was doing her modeling and it just became like two different worlds. And because I’d had such an experience of almost falling off the planet, I knew there were a lot of dangers out there so it was kind of me talking to myself about the second career I was about to embark on and also talking to her about her career. We’d basically split at that point, and that was the ode to our parting."

In an interview to Mojo, Stevens said: "It was one of those chord sequences that's very common in Spanish music. I turned it around and came up with that theme—which is a recurring theme in my work—which is to do with leaving, the sadness of leaving, and the anticipation of what lies beyond."

Released as a single in late 1970, it peaked at No. 11 on the Billboard Hot 100 chart. "Wild World" has been credited as the song that gave Stevens' next album, Tea for the Tillerman, "enough kick" to get it played on FM radio; and Island Records' Chris Blackwell called it "the best album we've ever released".

Stevens released a Zulu version of Wild World in 2006, and a "re-imagined" version of the song in 2020, both with slightly altered lyrics.

In November 2008, the Tea for the Tillerman CD was re-issued in a deluxe version which included the original demo of "Wild World". The original demo was also included on a 2020 "super deluxe" re-release, along with several live renditions.

== Interpretation ==
Some critics and music writers have deemed "Wild World" to be condescending and misogynistic. In her 1971 essay "But Now I'm Gonna Move," critic Ellen Willis described a method of revealing male bias in lyrics in which the listener imagines the genders reversed:

By this test, a diatribe like "Under My Thumb" is not nearly so sexist in its implications as, for example, Cat Stevens's gentle, sympathetic "Wild World"; Jagger's fantasy of sweet revenge could easily be female—in fact, it has a female counterpart, Nancy Sinatra's "Boots" — but it's hard to imagine a woman sadly warning her ex-lover that he's too innocent for the big bad world out there.

== Lyric change ==
In 2020, Stevens released a new, re-recorded version of Tea for the Tillerman to mark its 50th anniversary called Tea for the Tillerman^{2}. The album contained a new version of "Wild World", with an altered arrangement and lyrics.

The new version removes the word "girl" entirely, as well as the line "don't be a bad girl"; replacing "girl" with "baby" and "child".

Another line from the original song omitted in the new version is:

"Hope you make a lot of nice friends out there

But just remember there's a lot of bad and beware"

== Personnel ==
- Cat Stevens – classical guitar, acoustic guitar, keyboards, lead vocals
- Alun Davies – acoustic guitar, backing vocals
- Harvey Burns – drums, congas, tambourine
- John Ryan – double bass

== Charts ==
=== Weekly charts ===
Weekly chart performance for "Wild World"
| Chart (1970–1971) | Peak position |
|---|---|
| Belgium (Ultratop 50 Flanders) | 31 |
| Canada Top Singles (RPM) | 14 |
| Canada Adult Contemporary (RPM) | 32 |
| US Billboard Hot 100 | 11 |
| US Adult Contemporary (Billboard) | 21 |
| US Cash Box Top 100 | 18 |

| Chart (2007) | Peak position |
|---|---|
| Italy (FIMI) | 30 |
| UK Singles (Official Charts) | 52 |

| Chart (2014) | Peak position |
|---|---|
| Italy (FIMI) | 84 |

=== Year-end charts ===
| Chart (1971) | Rank |
|---|---|
| US Cash Box Top 100 | 98 |

== Certifications ==
| Region | Certification | Certified units/sales |
|---|---|---|
| Italy (FIMI) | Platinum | 70,000^{‡} |
| New Zealand (RMNZ) | 4× Platinum | 120,000^{‡} |
| Spain (Promusicae) | Platinum | 60,000^{‡} |
| United Kingdom (BPI) | Platinum | 600,000^{‡} |
^{‡} Sales+streaming figures based on certification alone.

== Cover versions ==
The song has been covered by many artists, with many of the covers becoming hits of their own. Jimmy Cliff's version, released a few months after Stevens released the original version, reached No. 8 on the UK Singles Chart. Surprisingly, Stevens' version was not released as a single in the UK. Some of the subsequent covers have also been in the reggae style, such as Maxi Priest's version of the song. Recorded and released as a single in 1988, this version also did well on the charts, reaching No. 5 on the UK Singles Chart and No. 25 on the US Billboard Hot 100.

In 1987, Jonathan King accused Pet Shop Boys of plagiarising the melody of "Wild World" for their UK No. 1 single "It's a Sin". He made the claims in The Sun, for which he wrote a regular column during the 1980s. King also released his own cover version of "Wild World" as a single, using a similar musical arrangement to "It's a Sin", in an effort to demonstrate his claims. This single flopped, while Pet Shop Boys sued King, eventually winning out-of-court damages, which they donated to charity.

On 7 July 2007, the song was performed twice at the Live Earth concerts. James Blunt sang it at Wembley Stadium in London, England, while Stevens (by then known as Yusuf Islam) himself sang it in Hamburg, Germany.

In 2011, Taiwanese-American singer Joanna Wang released her own version on her album The Things We Do for Love. Wang's version was also featured in American web television series The Good Fight Season 1, 2017.

=== Notable covers ===
- 1970: Jimmy Cliff
- 1971: Claude François (Fleur sauvage)
- 1971: Barry Ryan
- 1971: Bette Midler
- 1971: José Feliciano
- 1971: The Gentrys
- 1971: The Ventures
- 1971: Franck Pourcel (Instrumental version)
- 1971: Sacha Distel
- 1987: Maxi Priest
- 1987: Jonathan King
- 1989: SNFU
- 1993: Mr. Big
- 1994: Wise Guys
- 2000: Pepê & Neném
- 2001: Me First and the Gimme Gimmes
- 2003: Skye Sweetnam (Billy S. – B-side)
- 2004: John Waite
- 2007: Skins cast, led by Mike Bailey
- 2007: James Blunt
- 2010: Ronan Keating (feat. Marvin Priest)
- 2012: Andy Allo
- 2013: Garth Brooks
- 2018: Bastille (feat. Kianja)
- 2018: Marion Raven (Live version for her acoustic tour in Norway)
- 2020: Mick McGuigan (live at home)

=== Maxi Priest version ===
"Wild World"

Single by Maxi Priest

from the album Maxi
- B-side: "On and On"
- Released: 23 May 1988
- Genre: Reggae
- Length: 3:38
- Label: Atlantic
- Songwriter: Cat Stevens
- Producers: Robbie Shakespeare; Willie Lindo; Lowell "Sly" Dunbar

Maxi Priest singles chronology
| "How Can We Ease The Pain?" (1988) | "Wild World" (1988) | "Goodbye to Love Again" (1990) |

Music video
- "Wild World" on YouTube

In 1988, English reggae vocalist Maxi Priest recorded a cover of "Wild World", which was released in May 1988 by Atlantic Records as the third single from his third album, Maxi (1987). The song was very successful, peaking at No. 5 in the United Kingdom, and at No. 25 on the US Billboard Hot 100. In Europe it was also successful, peaking at No. 3 in Norway, No. 5 in Belgium, Ireland, and New Zealand, No. 7 in the Netherlands, and No. 8 in Australia.

==== Critical reception ====
John Tague from NME wrote, "Priest, who has always leaned towards the commercial side of reggae anyway, revives the Cat Stevens song and strips it of any trace of reggaedom. Clean, crisp and bound for chart land."

==== Charts ====
===== Weekly charts =====
| Chart (1988) | Peak position |
|---|---|
| Australia (ARIA) | 8 |
| Belgium (Ultratop 50 Flanders) | 5 |
| Canada Top Singles (RPM) | 11 |
| Finland (Suomen virallinen lista) | 28 |
| Ireland (IRMA) | 5 |
| Netherlands (Dutch Top 40) | 7 |
| Netherlands (Single Top 100) | 7 |
| New Zealand (Recorded Music NZ) | 5 |
| Norway (VG-lista) | 3 |
| Sweden (Sverigetopplistan) | 17 |
| UK Singles (Official Charts) | 5 |
| US Billboard Hot 100 | 25 |

===== Year-end charts =====
| Chart (1988) | Position |
|---|---|
| Belgium (Ultratop Flanders) | 82 |
| Tokyo (Tokio Hot 100) | 93 |
| Netherlands (Dutch Top 40) | 76 |
| UK Singles (OCC) | 96 |

==== Certifications ====
| Region | Certification | Certified units/sales |
|---|---|---|
| New Zealand (RMNZ) | Gold | 15,000^{‡} |
^{‡} Sales+streaming figures based on certification alone.

=== Mr. Big version ===
"Wild World"

Single by Mr. Big

from the album Bump Ahead
- Released: October 1993
- Genre: Rock
- Length: 3:27
- Label: Atlantic
- Songwriter: Cat Stevens
- Producer: Kevin Elson

Mr. Big singles chronology
| "Just Take My Heart" (1992) | "Wild World" (1993) | "Ain't Seen Love Like That" (1994) |

Music video
- "Wild World" on YouTube

In 1993, American rock band Mr. Big released a cover of "Wild World" on their third album, Bump Ahead (1993). The single was produced by Kevin Elson and released in October 1993 by Atlantic Records. It charted at No. 27 and 25 on the US Billboard Hot 100 and Cash Box Top 100, No. 33 on the Top 40 Mainstream chart and No. 12 on the Mainstream Top 40 chart. In Europe, it was very successful, peaking at No. 4 in Denmark, No. 7 in Austria and Switzerland, at No. 10 in Norway, Sweden and Netherlands and No. 13 in Iceland. The accompanying music video for "Wild World" was directed by Nancy Bennett.

==== Critical reception ====
Larry Flick from Billboard magazine described it as "a relatively faithful cover". He added, "Pleasing lead vocals and tightly knit harmonies weave around cowboy-like acoustic strumming and nimble-but-subtle electric doodling. Warmly familiar, easy-going track". Troy J. Augusto from Cash Box wrote, "Back to ballad-land again with a credible cover of the Cat Stevens classic." Dave Sholin from the Gavin Report called it a "soulful, sensitive approach with a slight rock edge." He noted further that lead singer Eric Martin "is powerful without overpowering the song."

Another Gavin Report editor, Kent Zimmerman, complimented its "decidedly wooden, unplugged flavor". Alan Jones from Music Week said the song is "rendered in the low key intimate rock ballad style recently deployed by the likes of Metallica, Extreme and Little Angels. Mr. Big carry it of very well and can expect a modest hit." John Kilgo from The Network Forty noted that it "sounds remarkably similar to the 1971 original", adding that it "will sound like a fresh, new song to the younger demographics."

==== Track listing ====
CD single, Europe (1993)
| No. | Title | Length |
|---|---|---|
| 1. | "Wild World" | 3:27 |
| 2. | "Temperamental" | 4:55 |

CD maxi, Europe (1993)
| No. | Title | Length |
|---|---|---|
| 1. | "Wild World" | 3:27 |
| 2. | "Temperamental" | 4:55 |
| 3. | "Let Yourself Go" | 4:03 |
| 4. | "Voodoo Kiss" (Live Previously Unreleased) | 5:38 |

==== Charts ====
===== Weekly charts =====
| Chart (1993) | Peak position |
|---|---|
| Australia (ARIA) | 53 |
| Austria (Ö3 Austria Top 40) | 7 |
| Belgium (Ultratop 50 Flanders) | 24 |
| Canada Top Singles (RPM) | 9 |
| Denmark (IFPI) | 4 |
| Europe (Eurochart Hot 100) | 19 |
| Europe (European Hit Radio) | 4 |
| Finland (Suomen virallinen lista) | 30 |
| France (SNEP) | 39 |
| Germany (GfK) | 24 |
| Iceland (Íslenski Listinn Topp 40) | 13 |
| Israel (Israeli Singles Chart) | 3 |
| Japan (Oricon) | 56 |
| Netherlands (Dutch Top 40) | 10 |
| Netherlands (Single Top 100) | 11 |
| New Zealand (Recorded Music NZ) | 39 |
| Norway (VG-lista) | 10 |
| Sweden (Sverigetopplistan) | 10 |
| Switzerland (Schweizer Hitparade) | 7 |
| UK Singles (Official Charts) | 59 |
| UK Airplay (ERA) | 47 |
| US Adult Contemporary (Billboard) | 36 |
| US Billboard Hot 100 | 27 |
| US Mainstream Rock Airplay (Billboard) | 33 |
| US Pop Airplay (Billboard) | 12 |
| US Cash Box Top 100 | 25 |

| Chart (2026) | Peak position |
|---|---|
| Poland Airplay (OLiS) | 75 |

===== Year-end charts =====
| Chart (1993) | Position |
|---|---|
| Sweden (Topplistan) | 39 |

| Chart (1994) | Position |
|---|---|
| Netherlands (Dutch Top 40) | 89 |

==== Release history ====
| Region | Date | Format(s) | Label(s) | Ref. |
|---|---|---|---|---|
| United States | October 1993 | —N/a | Atlantic | |
| Australia | 1 November 1993 | CD; cassette | Atlantic | |
| Japan | 10 November 1993 | CD | Atlantic | |
