= Actual Size =

Studio album by Mr. Big
- Released: August 14, 2001 (Japan); August 28, 2001 (U.K.); September 25, 2001 (Europe)
- Genre: Hard rock; arena rock
- Length: 51:11
- Label: Atlantic
- Producer: Richie Zito

Mr. Big chronology
Get Over It (1999)	Actual Size (2001)	What If... (2010)

Singles from Actual Size
- 1. "Shine" Released: July 25, 2001 (Japan only); 2. "Arrow" Released: 2001 (Japan only)

Professional ratings
Review scores
Source	Rating
AllMusic	3/5 stars

Actual Size is the sixth album by the American rock band Mr. Big. Released in August 2001 through Atlantic Records, it was the band's final album with the label, their second and final studio album to feature guitarist Richie Kotzen, and their final studio album until What If... in 2010. The song "Shine" was used as the closing theme to the anime adaptation of Hellsing. Kotzen and Sheehan's band The Winery Dogs regularly performed the song in recent tours.

== Track listing ==
No.	Title	Writer(s)	Length
1.	"Lost in America"	Eric Martin, André Pessis	4:52
2.	"Wake Up"	Richie Kotzen, Richie Zito	3:45
3.	"Shine"	Kotzen, Zito	3:43
4.	"Arrow"	Martin, Jack Blades	3:43
5.	"Mary Goes 'Round"	Martin, Pessis	4:00
6.	"Suffocation"	Pat Torpey, Lanny Cordola, Chuck Wright	4:43
7.	"One World Away"	Torpey, Cordola, Wright	4:05
8.	"I Don't Want to Be Happy"	Martin, Zito, Kotzen, Pessis	4:50
9.	"Crawl Over Me"	Torpey, Cordola, Matt Sorum	5:08
10.	"Cheap Little Thrill"	Torpey, Cordola, Wright	3:12
11.	"How Did I Give Myself Away"	Martin, Billy Sheehan, Kotzen, Pessis	4:15
12.	"Nothing Like It in the World"	Martin, Pessis	5:02
Total length:			51:11

Japanese edition bonus track
No.	Title	Writer(s)	Length
13.	"Deep Dark Secret"	Torpey, Cordola, Wright	4:37

== Personnel ==
Mr. Big

- Eric Martin – lead vocals
- Richie Kotzen – lead guitar, vocals, co-lead vocals on "Suffocation", keyboards on "Nothing Like It in the World", engineer
- Billy Sheehan – bass guitar, vocals
- Pat Torpey – drums, percussion, vocals

Additional musicians

- Richie Zito – guitar, mandolin, producer, engineer

Production

- Brian Reeves, Patrick Shevelin – assistant engineers
- Phil Kaffel – mixing
- Larry Freemantle – art direction

== Charts ==
Chart (2001)	Peak position
Japanese Albums (Oricon)	5

== Certifications ==
Region	Certification	Certified units/sales
Japan (RIAJ)	Gold	100,000^{^}
^{^} Shipments figures based on certification alone.
