= Mr. Big (American band) =

American hard rock band

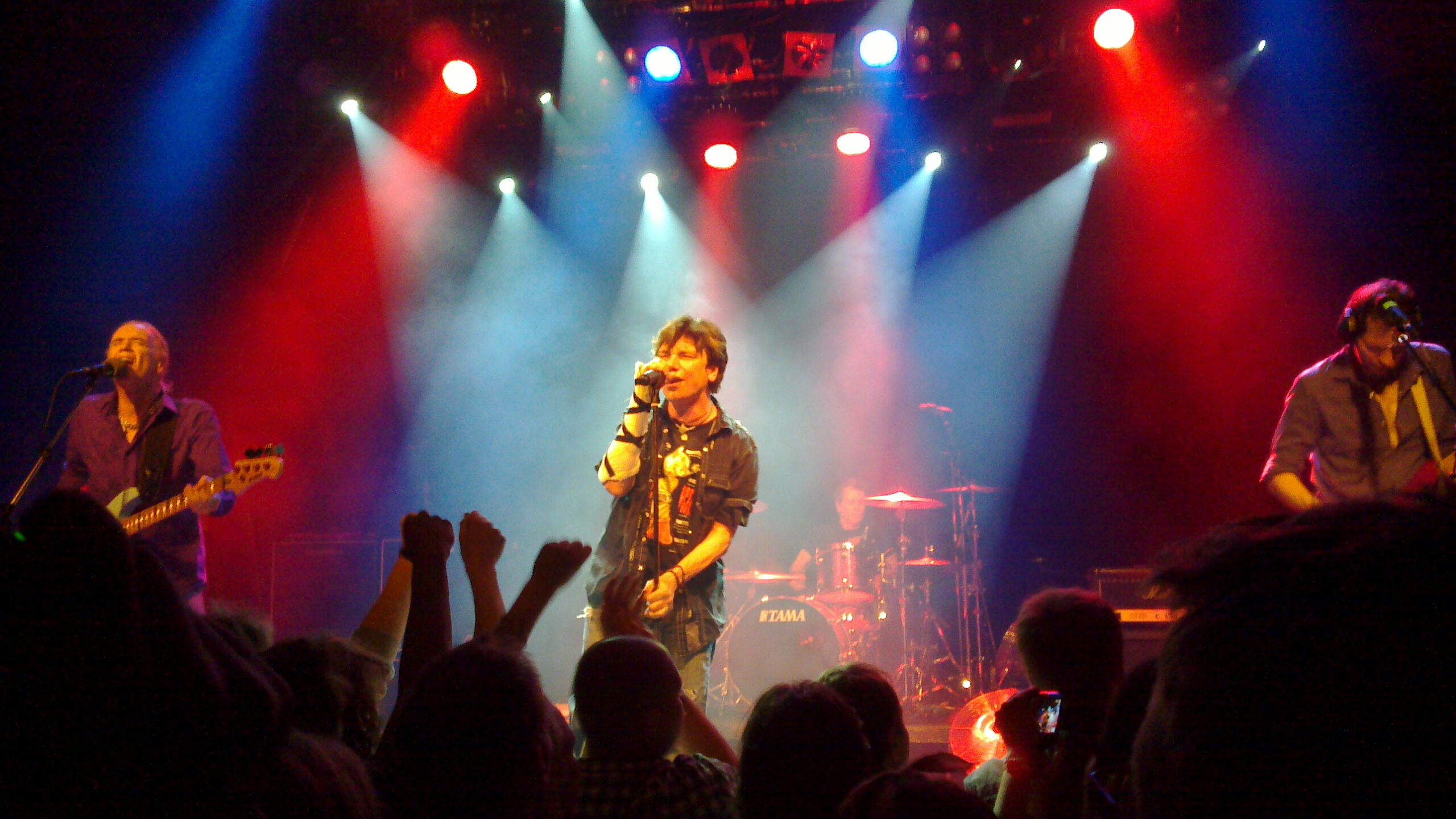
- Mr. Big performing in 2011

Background information
- Origin: Los Angeles, California, U.S.
- Genres: Hard rock; glam metal; arena rock
- Years active: 1988–2002; 2009–2025
- Labels: Atlantic/Warner; Frontiers; Evolution Music Group/Evoxs; Wowow Entertainment Inc.
- Spinoffs: Tak Matsumoto Group; The Winery Dogs
- Past members: Eric Martin; Billy Sheehan; Paul Gilbert; Pat Torpey; Richie Kotzen; Matt Starr; Nick D'Virgilio
- Website: www.mrbigsite.com

Mr. Big was an American rock band formed in Los Angeles in 1988. The band was originally composed of Eric Martin (lead vocals), Paul Gilbert (guitar), Billy Sheehan (bass), and Pat Torpey (drums). Though primarily a hard rock band, they are also known for softer songs. Their songs are often marked by strong vocals and vocal harmonies. Their hits include "To Be with You" (a number-one single in 15 countries in 1992) and "Just Take My Heart". The band takes its name from a song by Free which they covered on the 1993 album Bump Ahead.

Mr. Big remained active and popular for over a decade despite internal conflicts and changing musical trends, releasing four studio albums: Mr. Big (1989), Lean into It (1991), Bump Ahead (1993) and Hey Man (1996). Guitarist Paul Gilbert departed the band in 1999, and Richie Kotzen was brought on as a guitarist and vocalist. The band released two more albums with this line-up: Get Over It (1999) and Actual Size (2001). Mr. Big disbanded in 2002.

Following requests from fans, Mr. Big reunited with its original line-up in 2009. The band's first post-reunion tour was in Japan. In 2010, Mr. Big released its first album in 15 years with the same line-up: What If.... During the recording of the follow-up album ...The Stories We Could Tell (2014), Pat Torpey was diagnosed with Parkinson's disease and participated only marginally as a touring support. The band's ninth album, Defying Gravity (2017), was its last record involving Torpey, who performed on select tracks and was credited as a "drum producer"; drummer Matt Starr performed a majority of the drums on the album in his place. Following Torpey's death in 2018, the band went on hiatus, and later conducted a farewell tour in 2023 with former Spock's Beard drummer/vocalist Nick D'Virgilio. D'Virgilio subsequently performed on the band's tenth and final album Ten (2024).

Mr. Big is frequently cited as an example of the "Big in Japan" phenomenon, where a musical act is disproportionately more popular in Japan compared to elsewhere. Mr. Big is sometimes labeled as a one-hit wonder for "To Be with You", but they have maintained consistent popularity in the Japanese market throughout their career.

== History ==
=== Formation and debut album (1988–1990) ===
After bassist Billy Sheehan left David Lee Roth's backing band in 1988, he began piecing together a new band with the help of Mike Varney from Shrapnel Records, a label specialized in the shredding genre. Sheehan started by recruiting vocalist Eric Martin, a Capitol Records solo artist who Sheehan had become aware of after hearing the track "I Can't Stop the Fire", which Martin had recorded with Neal Schon for the soundtrack to the 1984 film Teachers. Sheehan had originally intended to complete the band with guitarist Steve Stevens and drummer Gregg Bissonette (who Sheehan had played with in Roth's backing band), but this fell apart when Stevens opted to pursue his Atomic Playboys project and Bissonette decided to stay with Roth. Soon after, guitarist Paul Gilbert of the Los Angeles-based heavy metal band Racer X joined the band on Sheehan's invitation. Several drummers were auditioned before Pat Torpey formally completed the line-up. Torpey, a journeyman session drummer, had previously recorded and toured with a number of high-profile artists, including Impellitteri, Stan Bush, Marilyn Martin, Belinda Carlisle, Ted Nugent, The Knack, and Jeff Paris (who would later collaborate with Mr. Big in a songwriting capacity).

At Martin's recommendation, the newly-formed band hired manager Herbie Herbert, who as well as managing Martin during his solo career in the mid-late 1980s, had worked with Santana, Journey and Europe. Several band names were considered, including "Wild Blue Yonder", "Red House", "Hawks and Doves", "Mars Needs Women" and "Magic to Burn", before Torpey suggested "Mr. Big", a nod to the song by Free.

By 1989, they signed with Atlantic Records and released their self-titled debut the same year, which charted just outside of the top 40 stateside and was also successful in Japan.

In June 1990, the group toured America as an opening act on Rush's Presto Tour. In August 1990, two songs, "Strike Like Lightning" and "Shadows", performed by Mr. Big, were exclusively released on the soundtrack album of the action film Navy SEALs.

=== Breakthrough and height of fame (1991–1997) ===
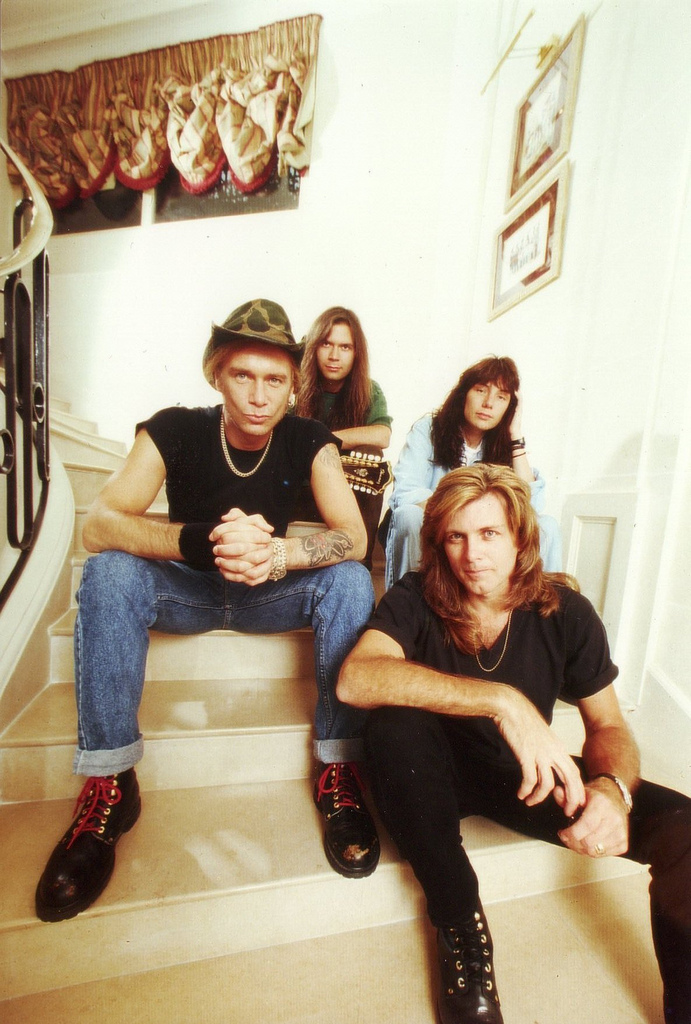
Mr. Big in 1992 From left: Billy Sheehan, Paul Gilbert, Pat Torpey, Eric Martin

Mr. Big's second album, 1991's Lean Into It, was a major commercial breakthrough, especially two ballads, "To Be with You" (which went to number one in fifteen countries) and "Just Take My Heart", as well as the song "Green-Tinted Sixties Mind". The cover features a picture of the train in the Montparnasse derailment. They toured the UK in April and May 1991, and again in 1992, releasing a live album, Mr. Big Live, in 1992. For three nights, they opened for Aerosmith at London's Wembley Arena.

In 1993, another ballad, a cover of Cat Stevens' "Wild World" (from their third album, Bump Ahead), peaked at No. 27 on the Billboard Hot 100. Although it is said that the band also contributed music to the soundtrack for the Sega Mega-CD release of The Amazing Spider-Man vs. The Kingpin, the songs actually featured Eric Martin with musicians hired by Sega.

The band released Hey Man in 1996. The song "Take Cover" was included on the soundtrack to the cartoon series Mega Man. Although the band never replicated its earlier success in the US market, their popularity continued to soar in Japan and in much of Asia. They continued to sell out tours in the Asian market, resulting in a number of live releases for the Japanese market. They are one of the more notable examples of the "Big in Japan" phenomenon. Live At Budokan was one of those live releases intended for the Japanese market only. By the time that album appeared, the group were on hiatus, as the individual band members became more engrossed in other projects; the band temporarily broke up in 1997.

=== Line-up change and break-up (1999–2002) ===
Gilbert left the band in 1999, and eventually reformed Racer X. Richie Kotzen, another Shrapnel artist and former guitarist for Poison, was brought in as a guitar player. Two studio albums were released by this lineup: Get Over It in 1999, and Actual Size in 2001. Get Over It was released in September 1999 in Japan, and yielded the single "Superfantastic," to a lukewarm audience response. Mr. Big performed a 20-date tour of Japan, followed by a New Year's Eve 1999 show with Aerosmith at the Osaka Dome, in Osaka, Japan. Get Over It was released in the US in March 2000, followed by a short club stint at "Roxy", California. Several music videos for songs on Get Over It were recorded (for "Electrified" and "Superfantastic"), however the director claimed rights to the music videos and they were never released. In 2001, Mr. Big released Actual Size in Asia. The CD sat on the charts in the number three spot and "Shine", the first single, went to number one. The song was also used as the ending theme for the anime series Hellsing.

However, tension had developed between Sheehan and the other members when Sheehan began touring with Steve Vai. Martin, Kotzen, and Torpey decided to write songs without Sheehan, who was only given credit for two songs on Actual Size. Martin and the others were also upset with Sheehan's attitude during the recording of the "Shine" music video. This was when Martin and Torpey decided the only way to keep moving forward was to fire Sheehan. Although Sheehan was upset that the other members had attempted to "fire" him from the band he created, he agreed to rejoin them, provided that that would be their farewell tour. The band then toured and ultimately disbanded, in February 2002, later issuing a statement in May.

=== Reunion and new albums (2009–2017) ===
A near Mr. Big "one-off" reunion took place on May 13, 2008, in Los Angeles, at the House of Blues, when Paul Gilbert was joined on stage by Pat Torpey, Richie Kotzen, and Billy Sheehan, for renditions of Humble Pie's "30 Days in the Hole" and original Mr. Big composition "Daddy, Brother, Lover, Little Boy". Reportedly, the three had such an amazing time that they decided to contact Eric Martin a few days later, and a reunion of the four original members (Paul, Eric, Pat, and Billy) was put into motion. On February 1, 2009, a radio announcement for "Koh Sakai's Burrn Presents: Heavy Metal Syndicate" contained a short message from Mr. Big, announcing the reunion of the original Mr. Big line-up to celebrate the twentieth anniversary of their debut album. A press conference in Japan in February generated much excitement, and a tour of the country starting in June was announced, with shows in ten locations (including the Budokan). They held their first reunion concert outside Japan at Rock Cafe in Tallinn, Estonia, in September 2009, continuing their tour. Mr. Big toured India in October 2009 as part of the Reunion Tour, playing to huge crowds in Bangalore, Dimapur, and Shillong. In September 2010, Mr. Big recorded a seventh album with producer Kevin Shirley at a Los Angeles-area studio. The album was released in Japan on December 15, 2010, in Europe on January 21, 2011, and in the US in February 2011. What If... is their first album of new material in nearly 10 years. The band also toured in support of the album. The tour to support the album kicked off at The House of Blues, in Hollywood, California, on April 2, 2011, and ended at the Rockout Festival in Istanbul, Turkey, in October 2011. The band also appeared at the Download Festival in June 2011. As part of the album release, the group created a music video for the song "Undertow". Directed by Vicente Cordero and Fernando Cordero, it featured the band in an industrial park.

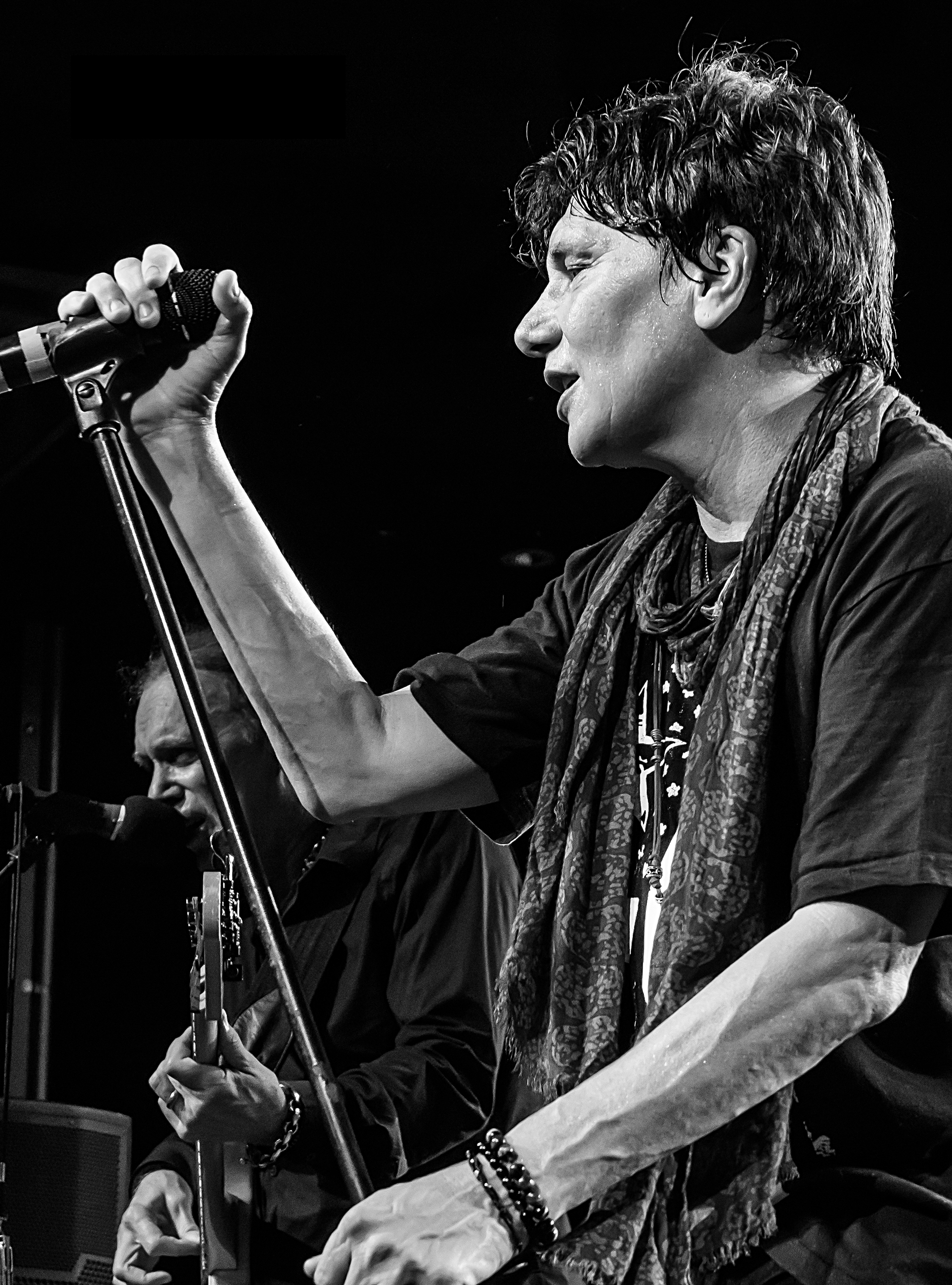
Billy Sheehan and Eric Martin performing in 2016

Mr. Big released their eighth studio album ...The Stories We Could Tell on September 30, 2014, via Frontiers Records. It was produced by Pat Regan, who returned as producer for the first time since 1999's Get Over It. The band confirmed that Pat's fill-in for the upcoming world tour would be Burning Rain drummer Matt Starr, who had also previously performed with Ace Frehley and Joe Lynn Turner. The group's latest album, Defying Gravity, was recorded in Los Angeles in six days, and released on July 21, 2017. Due to Pat Torpey being diagnosed with Parkinson's disease, he could not play drums fully on the record and played on only several tracks. Matt Starr recorded the drum tracks, while Pat Torpey acted as "drum producer."

=== Death of Pat Torpey, farewell tour with new drummer, and Ten (2018–2025) ===
On February 7, 2018, drummer Pat Torpey died from complications of Parkinson's disease at the age of 64. His last show took place at the Wulfrun Hall in Wolverhampton on November 23, 2017. A memorial show took place on May 23, 2018, at The Canyon in Agoura Hills, California, with former member Richie Kotzen as a special guest. The all-star finale of "To Be With You" included, among others, Matt Sorum, Dave Amato, Ricky Phillips, Keith St John, Prescott Niles, Kelly Keagy, Jeff Scott Soto, Ace Von Johnson and Gregg Bissonette.

In October 2018, Eric Martin said in interview with Friday NI Rocks that the band was in the process of planning their at-that-time possible next and final album. According to Martin, once the band was done with its commitments, they would subsequently disband: "Yeah, that's the last hurrah – that's it. It feels a little uncomfortable to keep going without Pat Torpey." However this never materialized and the band entered a state of hibernation with band members devoting time to other projects. In January 2021, Billy Sheehan said that the band was still together, "[...]but, as you know, sadly we lost our drummer, and we don't have any plan at this point for anything. We'll just let nature take its course. At some point, maybe we'll do something again. We don't know. Maybe me and Paul, maybe me and Eric, maybe Eric and Paul, maybe us with a different drummer — it could be anything — but we have not discussed it at all, and we're just kind of letting it go." He also expressed dissatisfaction with Defying Gravity, claiming there was "mastering problem [...that] made the LP unlistenable." He went on to say that "the label ruined the record" by insisting on having the album and "putting it out when it's not ready. If we had another day to get it to proper mastering and get it done right, it would have been fine. 'Cause I was there for the final mixes — I went in there every day and listened to mixes. Pat was there with us too. We went through the mixes, and they were sounding great. And, unfortunately, we got screwed."

In August 2022, Sheehan revealed that the band was "strongly considering" playing shows in 2023, with Matt Starr returning as the band's drummer. However, in a later interview he announced that the band have decided not to continue with Starr as their drummer due to his "vocal range" being different to Torpey's. Sheehan then stated the band has a new drummer whose identity will be revealed soon. When asked in November 2022 if Sheehan's claims that Mr. Big were reuniting to tour and possibly record new material in 2023 were true, Martin said, "I'm not a hundred percent on the recording part, but, yeah, we're gonna do it. We're definitely gonna tour."

In March 2023, it was announced that Nick D'Virgilio would be joining Mr. Big as touring drummer for the 2023-24 "The Big Finish Tour".

Despite having announced a farewell tour, Martin confirmed in November 2023 that the band were still working on new material for their tenth studio album. This resulting album, Ten, was released on July 12, 2024.

On August 23, 2024, Mr. Big played their final show of the Big Finish Farewell Tour at Way Too Far Rock Festival in Romania.

On February 11, 2025, the band announced four final shows to take place in India and Japan later that month, with the last show taking place on February 25 in Tokyo.

== Band members ==
- Eric Martin – lead vocals, acoustic guitar (1988–2002, 2009–2025)
- Billy Sheehan – bass, backing vocals (1988–2002, 2009–2025)
- Pat Torpey – drums, percussion, backing vocals (1988–2002, 2009–2018; his death)
- Paul Gilbert – guitars, backing vocals (1988–1999, 2009–2025)
- Richie Kotzen – guitars, backing and lead vocals (1999–2002; guest in 2018)
- Matt Starr – drums, percussion, backing vocals (2018; touring 2014–2018)
- Nick D'Virgilio – drums, percussion, backing vocals (2023–2025)

=== Touring musicians ===
- Troy Luccketta – drums (1988)
- Michele Luppi – co-lead and backing vocals (2024)
- Edu Cominato – drums (2024)

== Discography ==
Studio albums

- Mr. Big (1989)
- Lean into It (1991)
- Bump Ahead (1993)
- Hey Man (1996)
- Get Over It (1999)
- Actual Size (2001)
- What If... (2011)
- ...The Stories We Could Tell (2014)
- Defying Gravity (2017)
- Ten (2024)
