= Hey Man =

Studio album by Mr. Big
- Released: January 25, 1996 (Japan); March 12, 1996 (US/UK)
- Recorded: 1995
- Studios: Rumbo, Canoga Park, California; Fantasy, Berkeley, California
- Genres: Hard rock; soft rock
- Length: 44:51
- Label: Atlantic
- Producer: Kevin Elson

Mr. Big chronology
Bump Ahead (1993)	Hey Man (1996)	Get Over It (1999)

Singles from Hey Man
- 1. "Dancin' Right into the Flame" Released: 1996; 2. "Goin' Where the Wind Blows" Released: 1996

Professional ratings
Review scores
Source	Rating
AllMusic	2/5 stars
Collector's Guide to Heavy Metal	7/10
Rock Hard	8.0/10

Hey Man is the fourth studio album by the hard rock band, Mr. Big. It would be their last album with guitarist Paul Gilbert until 2011's What If.... The album was the most successful Mr. Big release in Japan, topping the Japanese Oricon chart, where it remained for 16 weeks.

== Background ==
The album was recorded in 1995, with Kevin Elson returning as producer following his work on the band's previous album, Bump Ahead (1993). Recording took place at Rumbo Studios in Los Angeles, California, and Fantasy Studios in Berkeley, California.

The album featured vocalist Eric Martin, guitarist Paul Gilbert, bassist Billy Sheehan and drummer Pat Torpey. Kevin Elson and Tom Size handled the recording and mixing, while Bob Ludwig was responsible for mastering. John Novello played the Hammond organ on several tracks.

Hey Man was released in Japan on 25 January 1996 and in the United States on 12 March 1996 through Atlantic Records. The Japanese edition included "Tears" as a bonus track in addition to the standard track listing.

The album was the last Mr. Big studio album to feature Gilbert. He subsequently left the band and returned for the group's reunion in 2009, later contributing to their studio recordings again with What If..., released in 2010.

== Track listing ==
No.	Title	Writer(s)	Length
1.	"Trapped in Toyland"	Paul Gilbert, Jeff Martin, Russ Parrish	4:24
2.	"Take Cover"	Eric Martin, Gilbert, André Pessis	4:38
3.	"Jane Doe"	Gilbert, Billy Sheehan, Pat Torpey	3:36
4.	"Goin' Where the Wind Blows"	E. Martin, Pessis	4:19
5.	"The Chain"	E. Martin, Pessis	3:46
6.	"Where Do I Fit In?"	E. Martin, Gilbert, Pessis	4:22
7.	"If That's What It Takes"	E. Martin, Sheehan, Torpey, Pessis, Tony Fanucchi	4:47
8.	"Out of the Underground"	Gilbert	4:05
9.	"Dancin' Right into the Flame"	E. Martin, Sheehan, Pessis	3:02
10.	"Mama D."	Gilbert	4:32
11.	"Fool Us Today"	E. Martin, Sheehan, Torpey	4:23

European bonus track
No.	Title	Writer(s)	Length
12.	"Little Mistake"	Gilbert, Sheehan	3:45

Japanese bonus track
No.	Title	Writer(s)	Length
12.	"Tears"	Gilbert	3:19

Expanded & Remastered bonus tracks
No.	Title	Writer(s)	Length
12.	"Take Cover" (Demo)	E. Martin, Gilbert, Pessis	5:10
13.	"I Love You Japan" (Demo)	Gilbert	3:41
14.	"Swingin' Jam" (Demo)	Gilbert, Sheehan, Torpey	0:36

== Personnel ==
Mr. Big

- Eric Martin – lead vocals
- Paul Gilbert – guitar, vocals
- Billy Sheehan – bass guitar, vocals
- Pat Torpey – drums, vocals

Production

- Kevin Elson – producer, engineer, mixing
- Tom Size – engineer, mixing
- John Novello, Michael Rosen, Shawn Berman – assistant engineers
- Bob Ludwig – mastering

== Charts ==
Chart (1996)	Peak position
Australian Albums (ARIA)	176
German Albums (Offizielle Top 100)	74
Japanese Albums (Oricon)	1
Swiss Albums (Schweizer Hitparade)	48
UK Rock & Metal Albums (Official Charts)	23

== Certifications ==
Region	Certification	Certified units/sales
Japan (RIAJ)	Platinum	200,000^{^}
^{^} Shipments figures based on certification alone.
