= Billy Sheehan =

American bassist (born 1953)

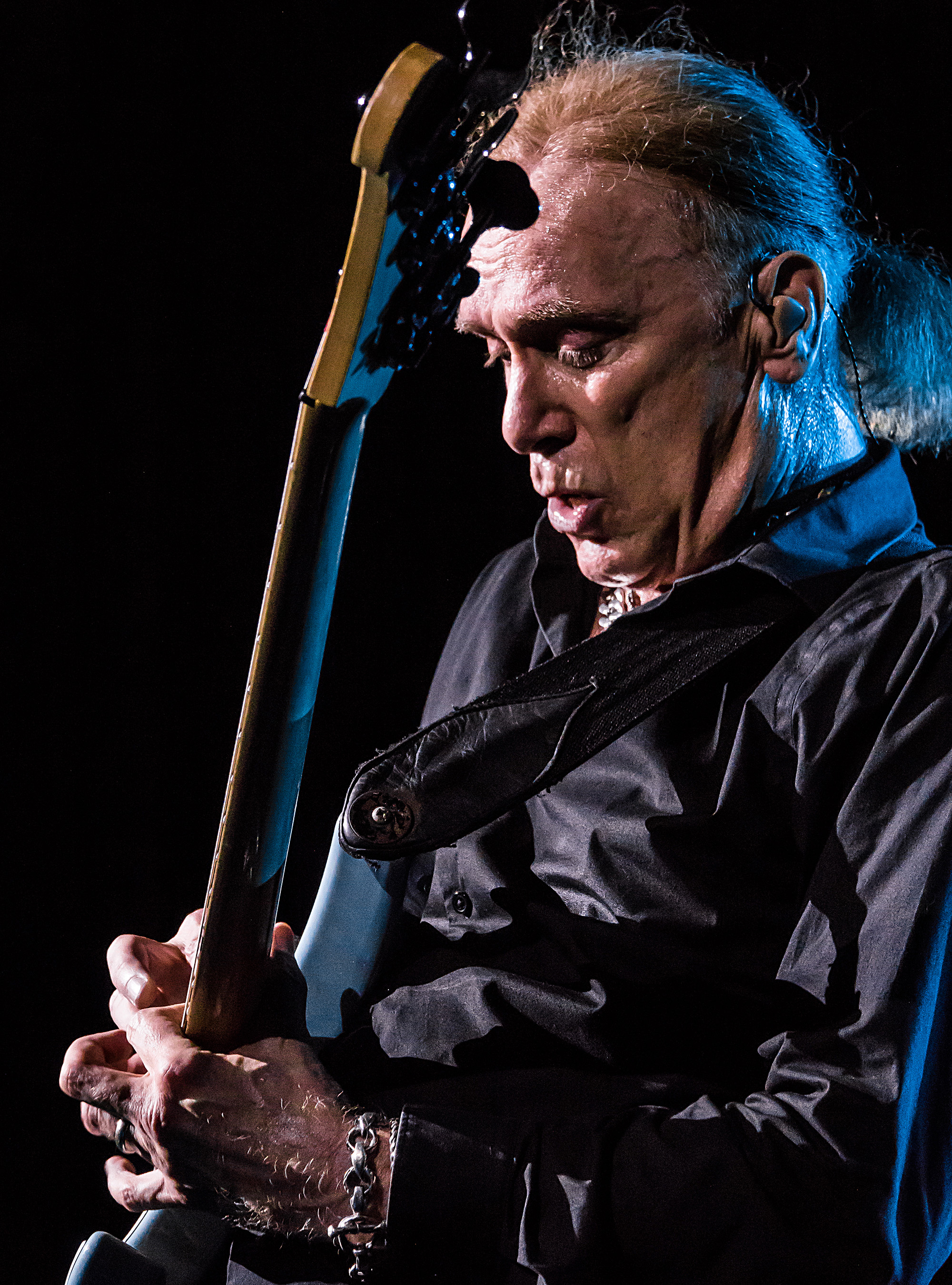
- Sheehan with Mr. Big in 2016

Background information
- Born: William Roland Sheehan; March 19, 1953 (age 73); Buffalo, New York, U.S.
- Genres: Hard rock; heavy metal; progressive metal; instrumental rock; progressive rock
- Occupation: Bassist
- Instruments: Bass guitar, vocals
- Years active: 1970–present
- Member of: The Winery Dogs
- Formerly of: Mr. Big; Sons of Apollo; Talas; UFO; David Lee Roth; Niacin
- Website: billysheehan.com

William Sheehan (born March 19, 1953) is an American musician known for playing bass guitar with acts such as Talas, Steve Vai, David Lee Roth, Mr. Big, Niacin, and The Winery Dogs. He is also known for his "lead bass" playing style, including the use of chording, two-handed tapping, "three-finger picking" technique and controlled feedback. Sheehan has been voted "Best Rock Bass Player" five times in Guitar Player readers' polls.

== Career ==
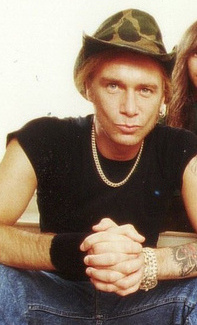
Sheehan in 1992

=== Early years ===
Billy Sheehan's first electric bass was a Hagström FB, (Note: "...your 00:31 first electric bass was a Hagstrom FB 00:33 true true") which was soon joined by a Precision bass. After acquiring the Precision bass, he removed the frets from the Hagström. (Note: "...after acquiring your first 00:57 fender precision bass you removed the 00:59 frets from the Hagstrom. I did.") Over the years, he heavily modified the Precision bass as well, scalloping the five highest frets, adding a neck pickup and additional support for the bolt-on neck, which Sheehan considers the instrument's greatest weakness. The neck pickup was added for what Sheehan referred to as "super deep low end" modelled after Paul Samwell-Smith of the Yardbirds and Mel Schacher of Grand Funk Railroad. The Gibson EB-0 type pickup in the neck and the original split-coil Precision bass pickup each have their own separate stereo output jacks on the bass itself, allowing for control of the tone via the bass. The Precision bass has since been retired, but Sheehan still affectionately refers to it as "The Wife". Sheehan's signature Yamaha Attitude bass is patterned after this instrument. Sheehan also uses two amps to achieve his signature tone, one with full distortion and high pass filtering to sound more guitar-like, and one super-clean for the low end of the neck pickup.

=== Talas ===
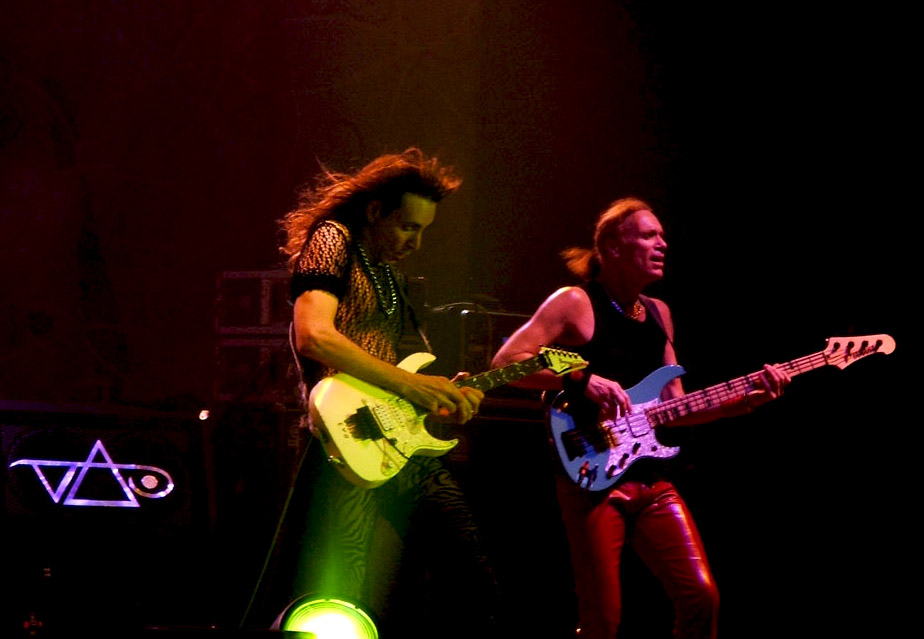
Sheehan (right) in concert with Steve Vai, 2005

Sheehan's first full-time band was Talas, a power trio with Dave Constantino on guitar and Paul Varga on drums. The band played a mixture of cover songs and original material, and all three instrumentalists alternated on lead vocals.

Talas was a popular local band in Buffalo for over a decade, attaining a cult status which spread into the northeast US and into Canada. In 1979, Talas released their eponymous debut album, which generated the regional hit single "See Saw". It was during this time that Sheehan wrote "Shy Boy" (later re-recorded with David Lee Roth) and "Addicted to that Rush" (later re-recorded with Mr. Big).

In the late 1970s, Sheehan also played in a band called Light Years with drummer Ron Rocco, who had earlier played in a band called Black Sheep with Foreigner singer Lou Gramm in Rochester, NY. After Sheehan returned to Talas they opened a show for UFO in Buffalo. This led Sheehan to an association with guitarist Michael Schenker and also helped land him the job touring with UFO in 1983.

Talas' first national exposure happened in 1980, when they opened thirty shows for Van Halen. However, success was elusive, and even as their brand of what came to be known as "glam metal" gained popularity over the next few years, Talas remained an unsigned act, partly due to poor management. (Note: "02:04 [...] I'm sure was a contributing 02:06 factor [...] but [our manager] it wasn't 02:08 horrible") They independently released their debut Talas LP on Evenfall Records (reissued by Metal Blade), then Sink Your Teeth into That on Relativity Records.

Seeking to take Talas further than just regional success, Sheehan reformed Talas with another drummer (Mark Miller), guitarist (Mitch Perry, also later of Heaven), and a dedicated vocalist, Phil Naro, with whom in the late 1970s Sheehan had previously worked in his side project (the Billy Sheehan Band). Talas released only one more album, Live Speed on Ice. After Mitch Perry left the band, he was replaced by Johnny Angel, who played guitar with them for their 1985/86 US tour opening for Yngwie Malmsteen's Rising Force. There was a fourth Talas record, tentatively titled Lights, Camera, Action, to be issued on Gold Mountain/A&M, but it never got past the demo stage due to Sheehan leaving to join David Lee Roth's solo band. Talas did briefly continue under Phil Naro sans Sheehan, enlisting Jimmy DeGrasso on drums, Al Pitrelli on guitar, Bruno Ravel on bass and Gary Bivona on keyboards, but by this time Talas was dead and Ravel formed Danger Danger. Sheehan also auditioned for Toronto-based rock band Max Webster, being a longtime friend of Max Webster singer/guitarist Kim Mitchell.

In the early 1980s, Sheehan became involved with the proto-thrash metal band Thrasher. During this time he shared the stage with future Anthrax guitarist Dan Spitz. His involvement with Thrasher did not last long but he did play on the self-titled LP, reissued on CD in 2008.

=== Niacin ===
In 1996, Sheehan formed the jazz fusion band Niacin with drummer Dennis Chambers and keyboardist John Novello. The band's name comes from the timbral foundation of the Hammond B3 organ (Vitamin B_{3} is also known as niacin).

Niacin released their first studio album in 1996. Their music is primarily instrumental, with the exception of their third studio album, Deep (2000), which features vocals by Glenn Hughes of Deep Purple. The album also includes guest guitar by Steve Lukather of Toto.

=== The Winery Dogs and Sons of Apollo ===
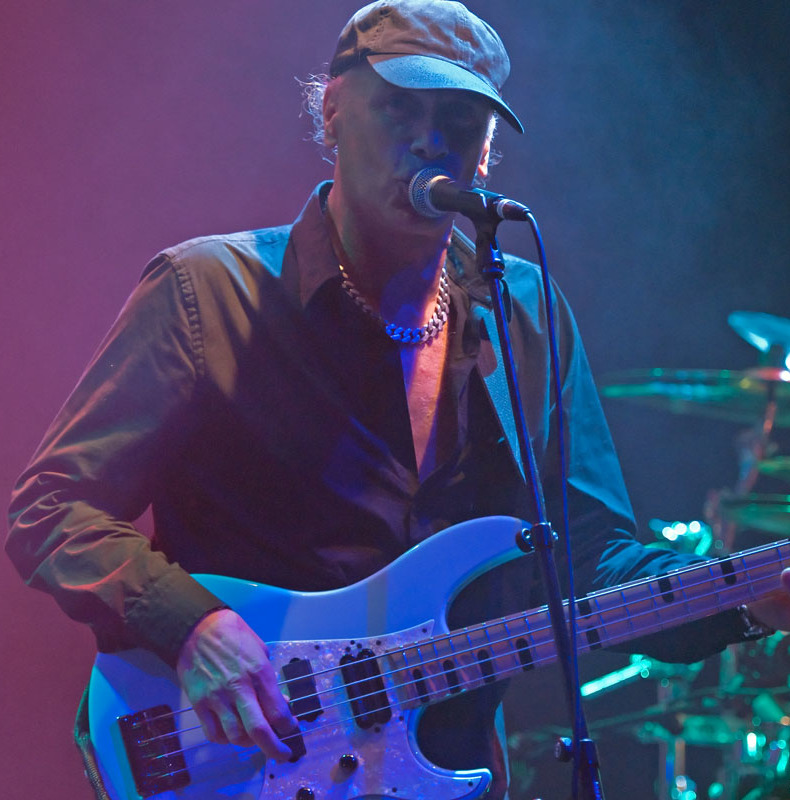
Sheehan performing with Mike Portnoy, Derek Sherinian, and Tony MacAlpine at De Boerderij, Netherlands, 2012

Sheehan toured with PSMS (Portnoy / Sheehan / MacAlpine / Sherinian), an instrumental supergroup, in the second half of 2012.

Sheehan, along with Portnoy and Richie Kotzen, recorded the debut album for their new band The Winery Dogs in August 2012. The self-titled album was released in 2013. Their second album, Hot Streak, was released in 2015.

In August 2017, he joined another band with Portnoy, a progressive metal supergroup named Sons of Apollo also featuring keyboardist Derek Sherinian, vocalist Jeff Scott Soto and guitarist Ron "Bumblefoot" Thal.

== Influences ==
Sheehan has cited Paul Samwell-Smith, Paul McCartney, Jack Bruce, Tim Bogert, James Jamerson, Glenn Cornick, Jack Casady, Andy Fraser, Larry Graham, John Entwistle, Jaco Pastorius, Stanley Clarke, Ray Brown, Ron Carter, Miroslav Vitouš, Mel Schacher, Peter Cetera, John Wetton, Jim Fielder, Greg Ridley, Felix Pappalardi, Glenn Hughes, and Doug Pinnick as influences.

== Personal life ==
Sheehan has been an active member of the Church of Scientology since 1971, having converted from Catholicism. Sheehan and his wife, Elisabetta, live in Nashville, Tennessee.

== Partial discography ==
=== With Talas ===
- 1979: Talas
- 1982: Sink Your Teeth into That
- 1984: Live Speed on Ice
- 1990: Talas Years (compilation)
- 1998: If We Only Knew Then What We Know Now – Live in Buffalo
- 2022: 1985

=== With Thrasher ===
- 1985: Burning at the Speed of Light

=== With Daniel Piquê ===
- 2009: Boo!!
- 2012: Chu (websingle)
- 2013: Oldboy (websingle)

=== With Tony MacAlpine ===
- 1986: Edge of Insanity

=== With KUNI ===
- 1986: MASQUE

=== With David Lee Roth ===
- 1986: Eat 'Em and Smile
- 1986: Sonrisa Salvaje (Spanish language re-recording of Eat 'Em and Smile)
- 1988: Skyscraper

=== With Greg Howe ===
- 1988: Greg Howe

=== With Mr. Big ===
- 1989: Mr. Big
- 1991: Lean into It
- 1993: Bump Ahead
- 1996: Hey Man
- 2000: Get Over It
- 2001: Actual Size
- 2010: What If...
- 2014: ...The Stories We Could Tell
- 2017: Defying Gravity
- 2024: Ten

=== With Niacin ===
- 1996: Niacin
- 1997: Live
- 1998: High Bias
- 2000: Deep
- 2001: Time Crunch
- 2003: Live! Blood, Sweat & Beers
- 2005: Organik
- 2005: Live in Tokyo (DVD)
- 2013: Krush

Solo

- 1999: All Over Me
- 2001: Compression
- 2005: Cosmic Troubadour
- 2006: Prime Cuts (compilation)
- 2009: Holy Cow!

=== Terry Bozzio and Billy Sheehan ===
- 2002: Nine Short Films

=== With Richie Kotzen ===
- 1998: What Is...
- 2003: Change
- 2006: Ai Senshi Z×R

=== With The Winery Dogs ===
- 2013: The Winery Dogs
- 2014: Unleashed in the East / Unleashed in Japan
- 2015: Hot Streak
- 2017: Dog Years (EP) / Dog Years: Live in Santiago
- 2023: III

=== With Michael Kocáb ===
- 2014: Aftershocks

=== With Sons of Apollo ===
- 2017: Psychotic Symphony
- 2019: Live with the Plovdiv Psychotic Symphony
- 2020: MMXX

=== With Mari Hamada ===
- 2018: Gracia
- 2023: Soar

=== With MIWA ===
- 2018: Reach Out and Touch Me
- 2020: Hell Is Real

=== With Octavision ===
- 2020: Coexist

=== With Peter Criss ===
- Peter Criss (2025)

== See also ==
- Bass Frontiers Magazine
- The Handle, a baritone electric guitar under the signature Billytone
- Shred guitar
