= To Be with You =

1991 single by Mr. Big

Single by Mr. Big

from the album Lean into It
- B-side: "Green-Tinted Sixties Mind"
- Released: November 22, 1991
- Recorded: 1990
- Studio: Rumbo (Los Angeles); Cherokee (Hollywood, California)
- Genre: Glam metal; soft rock
- Length: 3:27
- Label: Atlantic
- Songwriters: Eric Martin; David Grahame
- Producer: Kevin Elson

Mr. Big singles chronology
"Green-Tinted Sixties Mind" (1991)	"To Be with You" (1991)	"Just Take My Heart" (1992)

Music video
- "To Be with You" on YouTube

"To Be with You" is a song by American rock band Mr. Big, released in November 1991 by Atlantic Records as the second single from their second album, Lean into It (1991), on which it appears as the closing track. The ballad, written by the band's frontman Eric Martin with David Grahame and produced by Kevin Elson, reached number one on the US Billboard Hot 100 for three weeks as well as the Cash Box Top 100, and topped the charts in 11 other countries, including Australia, Canada, Germany, and New Zealand. The accompanying music video was directed by Nancy Bennett, depicting the band performing in a railroad car.

== Background and writing ==
The song was written and composed by Eric Martin during his teen years, with guitarist Paul Gilbert later on contributing to its melodic arrangements. Writing credit is also given to David Grahame, a songwriter working for the label at the time. The lyrics were inspired by a girl Martin knew when he was younger: "This girl had a lot of boyfriends who treated her like shit. I wanted to be the knight in shining armor, wanted to be with her. She wasn't having it. It never came to play."

While in Gilbert's apartment at Yucca Street in L.A., he and Martin were laying out their compositions. Martin had a ballad called "To Be with You". Gilbert had his psychedelic rock song called "Green Tinted Sixties Mind". Both felt the two songs were strong enough to be included in their upcoming album, despite it being purely rock; and true enough, these songs remained throughout the course of their career as a group and as solo artists.

Originally, "To Be with You" was not intended to be released as a single. But after it started getting radio play out of the blue, they decided to release it. The band's Billy Sheehan told in a 1992 interview, "We never intended to release 'To Be With You'. We had another single. But some guy in Lincoln, Nebraska just started playing the song, and the copies of the song started selling like crazy. It spread to Omaha and went all over the country."

== Critical reception ==
Stephen Thomas Erlewine from AllMusic described the song as a "campfire-singalong ballad." Larry Flick from Billboard magazine noted that "headbangers get folky on this harmonious strummer." He added that "hand-clapping, sing-along chorus entices, while front man Eric Martin's voice has rarely sounded sweeter." DeVaney and Clark from Cashbox named it "an unplugged, acoustic guitar and harmony sing-along single." They also said that Martin "sounds like the quintessential rocker and is backed by some excellent non-electric guitar-picking by guitarist Paul Gilbert, managing to sound very adept without an electric drill for a pick." Janiss Garza from Entertainment Weekly felt "this simple little ballad" is by far the best song on Lean into It. Jonathan Bernstein from Spin wrote, "In a year sadly lacking in palpable power ballads, these third-raters rode their Trojan horse to pole position with one of the always-spineless genre's most puny entries, 'To Be with You'."

== Music video ==
The music video for "To Be with You" was directed by Nancy Bennett and features the band performing in a railroad car. The video changes from black and white to color around the halfway mark. Billy Sheehan told in an interview, "Even our video was done way-super-ultra-cheap. When we tell people how much we spent on the video, they can't believe it. We got this video together dirt cheap. To see it beating up Michael Jackson's million-dollar extravaganza on MTV is pretty amazing."

== Track listings ==
- 7-inch single
1. "To Be with You" (LP version) (3:27)
2. "Green-Tinted Sixties Mind" (LP version) (3:30)
- 12-inch maxi
1. "To Be with You"
2. "A Little Too Loose" (live)
3. "The Drill Song (Daddy, Brother, Lover, Little Boy)" (live)
4. "Alive and Kickin'" (live)
- CD maxi
1. "To Be with You" (3:27)
2. "Green-Tinted Sixties Mind" (3:30)
3. "Alive and Kickin'" (5:28)

== Personnel ==
- Eric Martin – lead vocals
- Paul Gilbert – acoustic guitar, handclaps, backing vocals
- Billy Sheehan – bass guitar, handclaps, bass drum, backing vocals
- Pat Torpey – tambourine, bass drum, backing vocals

== Charts ==
=== Weekly charts ===
Chart (1991–1992)	Peak position
Australia (ARIA)	1
Austria (Ö3 Austria Top 40)	1
Belgium (Ultratop 50 Flanders)	1
Canada Top Singles (RPM)	1
Canada Adult Contemporary (RPM)	4
Denmark (IFPI)	1
Europe (Eurochart Hot 100)	1
Europe (European Hit Radio)	3
Finland (Suomen virallinen lista)	6
France (SNEP)	10
Germany (GfK)	1
Ireland (IRMA)	2
Netherlands (Dutch Top 40)	1
Netherlands (Single Top 100)	1
New Zealand (Recorded Music NZ)	1
Norway (VG-lista)	1
Panama (UPI)	9
Sweden (Sverigetopplistan)	1
Switzerland (Schweizer Hitparade)	1
UK Singles (Official Charts)	3
UK Singles (MRIB)	1
UK Airplay (Music Week)	1
US Billboard Hot 100	1
US Adult Contemporary (Billboard)	11
US Album Rock Tracks (Billboard)	19
US Cash Box Top 100	1

=== Year-end charts ===
Chart (1992)	Position
Australia (ARIA)	4
Austria (Ö3 Austria Top 40)	5
Belgium (Ultratop)	20
Brazil (Crowley)	24
Canada Top Singles (RPM)	2
Canada Adult Contemporary (RPM)	52
Europe (Eurochart Hot 100)	4
Europe (European Hit Radio)	20
Germany (Media Control)	6
Netherlands (Dutch Top 40)	7
Netherlands (Single Top 100)	8
New Zealand (RIANZ)	3
Sweden (Topplistan)	3
Switzerland (Schweizer Hitparade)	3
UK Singles (OCC)	31
UK Airplay (Music Week)	17
US Billboard Hot 100	12
US Cash Box Top 100	9

=== Decade-end charts ===
Chart (1990–1999)	Position
Austria (Ö3 Austria Top 40)	36
Netherlands (Dutch Top 40)	85
US Billboard Hot 100	90

== Certifications ==
Region	Certification	Certified units/sales
Australia (ARIA)	Platinum	70,000^{^}
Germany (BVMI)	Gold	250,000^{^}
Japan (RIAJ) Digital	Gold	100,000^{*}
Netherlands (NVPI)	Gold	50,000^{^}
New Zealand (RMNZ)	3× Platinum	90,000^{‡}
Sweden (GLF)	Gold	25,000^{^}
United Kingdom (BPI)	Gold	400,000^{‡}
United States (RIAA)	Gold	500,000^{^}
^{*} Sales figures based on certification alone.^{^} Shipments figures based on certification alone.^{‡} Sales+streaming figures based on certification alone.

== Release history ==
Region	Date	Format(s)	Label(s)	Ref.
United States	November 22, 1991	7-inch vinyl; cassette	Atlantic	
United Kingdom	February 24, 1992	7-inch vinyl; 12-inch vinyl; CD; cassette	Atlantic	
Australia	March 9, 1992	CD; cassette	Atlantic	
