= Lean into It =

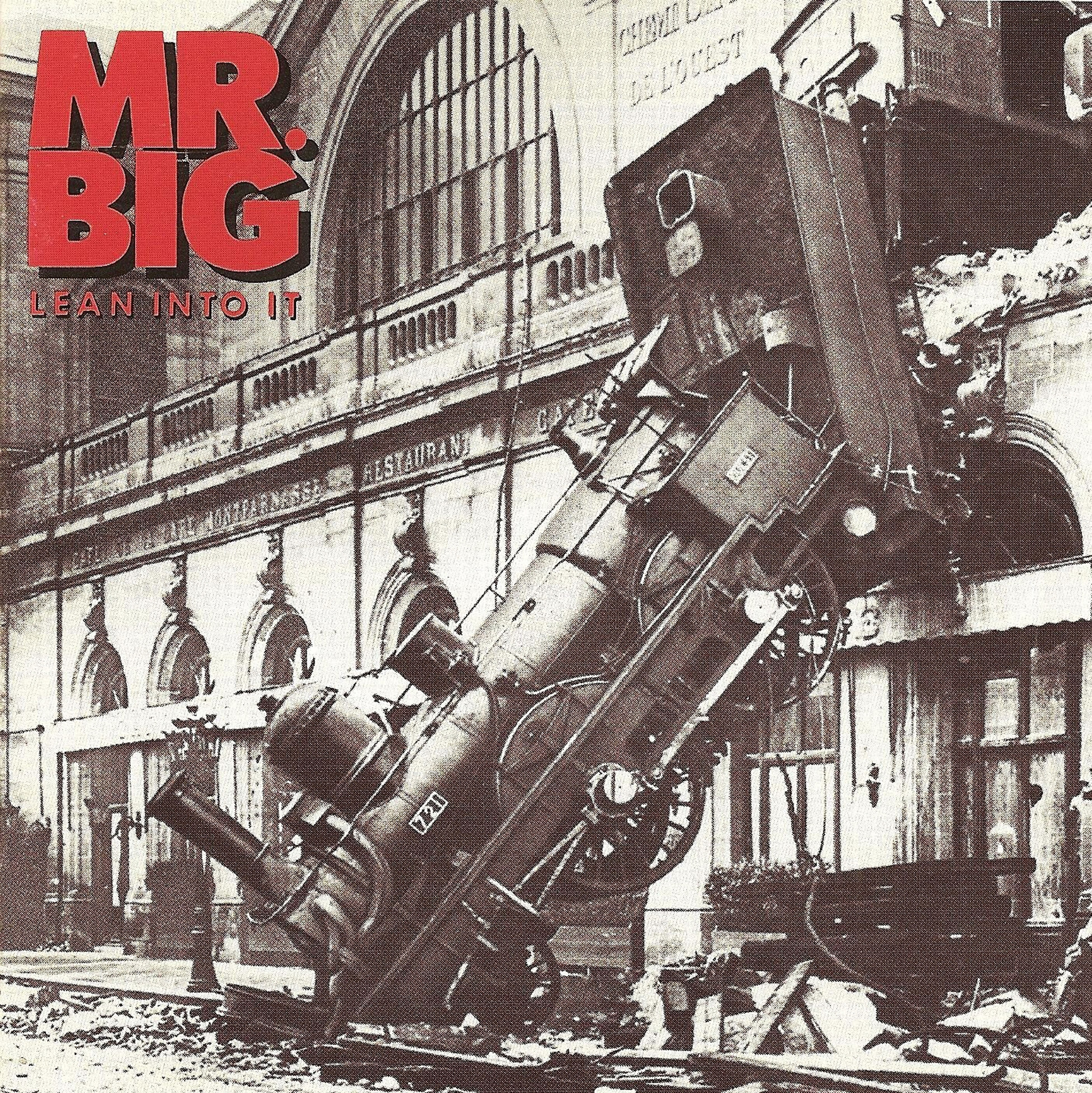

Studio album by Mr. Big
- Released: March 26, 1991
- Recorded: 1990–91
- Studios: Rumbo (Los Angeles); Cherokee (Hollywood); Fantasy (Berkeley)
- Genres: Hard rock; glam metal
- Length: 46:09
- Label: Atlantic
- Producer: Kevin Elson

Mr. Big chronology
| Mr. Big (1989) | Lean into It (1991) | Bump Ahead (1993) |

Singles from Lean into It
- 1. "Daddy, Brother, Lover, Little Boy (The Electric Drill Song)" Released: March 1991; 2. "Green-Tinted Sixties Mind" Released: May 1991; 3. "To Be with You" Released: November 1991; 4. "Just Take My Heart" Released: April 1992

Professional ratings
Review scores
| Source | Rating |
|---|---|
| AllMusic | 4/5 stars |
| Collector's Guide to Heavy Metal | 7/10 |
| Entertainment Weekly | C+ |
| Rock Hard | 7.5/10 |

Lean into It is the second studio album by the American rock band Mr. Big, released on March 26, 1991. The band's breakthrough release, Lean into It peaked at number 15 on the Billboard 200 charts, while the single "To Be with You" became the band's first and only song to hit number 1 on the Billboard Hot 100. The follow-up single, "Just Take My Heart", was a top-20 hit, peaking at number 16 on the Billboard Hot 100.

"Daddy, Brother, Lover, Little Boy" features Gilbert and Sheehan running Makita cordless drills over their guitar strings in harmony to create an unusually fast solo which is likely not possible to replicate with hands. The "CDFF" prefix of the Jeff Paris-penned "Lucky This Time", is the song "Addicted to That Rush" from the band's 1989 eponymous debut album, played at a higher playback speed; hence the "CDFF" for "Compact Disc Fast Forward", "CDFF" is also the chord structure to the song.

The cover image is a picture from the Montparnasse train accident that occurred on October 22, 1895, in Gare Montparnasse station in Paris.

The album was ranked No. 49 on Rolling Stone's list of the 50 Greatest Hair Metal Albums of All Time.

The album includes the song "Green-Tinted Sixties Mind".

== Track listing ==
| No. | Title | Writer(s) | Length |
|---|---|---|---|
| 1. | "Daddy, Brother, Lover, Little Boy (The Electric Drill Song)" | Billy Sheehan; Paul Gilbert; André Pessis; Pat Torpey; Eric Martin | 3:54 |
| 2. | "Alive and Kickin'" | Gilbert; Martin; Pessis; Sheehan; Torpey | 5:28 |
| 3. | "Green-Tinted Sixties Mind" | Gilbert | 3:30 |
| 4. | "CDFF-Lucky This Time" | Jeff Paris | 4:10 |
| 5. | "Voodoo Kiss" | Martin; Pessis | 4:07 |
| 6. | "Never Say Never" | Martin; Jim Vallance | 3:48 |
| 7. | "Just Take My Heart" | Martin; Pessis | 4:21 |
| 8. | "My Kinda Woman" | Gilbert; Martin; Sheehan | 4:09 |
| 9. | "A Little Too Loose" | Gilbert | 5:21 |
| 10. | "Road to Ruin" | Torpey; Paris; Gilbert; Sheehan | 3:54 |
| 11. | "To Be with You" | Martin; David Grahame | 3:27 |
| Total length: | | | 46:09 |

Japanese edition bonus track
| No. | Title | Writer(s) | Length |
|---|---|---|---|
| 12. | "Love Makes You Strong" | Gilbert | 3:28 |

2010 remastered edition bonus tracks
| No. | Title | Writer(s) | Length |
|---|---|---|---|
| 12. | "Love Makes You Strong" | Gilbert | 3:28 |
| 13. | "Alive and Kickin'" (Demo) | Gilbert; Martin; Pessis; Sheehan; Torpey | 4:56 |
| 14. | "Green-Tinted Sixties Mind" (Demo) | Gilbert | 3:42 |
| 15. | "To Be with You" (Demo; reggae version) | Martin; Grahame | 1:17 |

2021 30th anniversary edition bonus disc
| No. | Title | Writer(s) | Length |
|---|---|---|---|
| 1. | "Stop Messing Around" | Martin; Tony Fanucchi | 4:02 |
| 2. | "Wild Wild Women" | Martin; Roger Silver; Pessis | 3:35 |
| 3. | "Just Take My Heart" (Piano version) | Martin; Pessis | 3:49 |
| 4. | "Shadows" | Giorgio Moroder; Tom Whitlock; Larry Lee; Steve Bates | 3:42 |
| 5. | "Strike Like Lightning" | Moroder; Whitlock; Lee; Bates | 3:43 |
| 6. | "Love Makes You Strong" | Gilbert | 3:27 |
| 7. | "Alive and Kickin'" (Demo) | Gilbert; Martin; Pessis; Sheehan; Torpey | 4:56 |
| 8. | "Green-Tinted Sixties Mind" (Demo) | Gilbert | 3:41 |
| 9. | "To Be With You" (Demo; reggae version) | Martin; Grahame | 1:18 |
| 10. | "Daddy, Brother, Lover, Little Boy (The Electric Drill Song)" (Minus guitar) | Sheehan; Gilbert; Pessis; Torpey; Martin | 3:47 |
| 11. | "Green-Tinted Sixties Mind" (Minus guitar) | Gilbert | 3:31 |
| 12. | "Love Makes You Strong" (Minus bass) | Gilbert | 3:27 |
| 13. | "Daddy, Brother, Lover, Little Boy (The Electric Drill Song)" (Minus bass) | Sheehan; Gilbert; Pessis; Torpey; Martin | 3:55 |

== Personnel ==
Mr. Big

- Eric Martin – lead vocals, handclaps
- Paul Gilbert – electric guitar, acoustic guitar, handclaps, backing vocals, electric drill
- Billy Sheehan – bass, six-string bass on "Just Take My Heart", handclaps, backing vocals, electric drill
- Pat Torpey – drums, percussion, handclaps, backing vocals

Production

- Kevin Elson – producer, engineer, mixing,
- Tom Size – mixing
- Chris Kupper, David Lucke, Scott Ralston, Michael Semanick, Andy Udoff – assistant engineers
- Bob Ludwig – mastering at Masterdisk, New York
- William Holmes – photography
- Bob Defrin – art direction

== Charts ==
| Chart (1991–92) | Peak position |
|---|---|
| Australian Albums (ARIA) | 18 |
| Austrian Albums (Ö3 Austria) | 3 |
| Canada Top Albums/CDs (RPM) | 4 |
| Dutch Albums (Album Top 100) | 20 |
| Finnish Albums (The Official Finnish Charts) | 6 |
| German Albums (Offizielle Top 100) | 9 |
| Hungarian Albums (MAHASZ) | 29 |
| Japanese Albums (Oricon) | 6 |
| New Zealand Albums (RMNZ) | 18 |
| Norwegian Albums (VG-lista) | 10 |
| Swiss Albums (Schweizer Hitparade) | 3 |
| Swedish Albums (Sverigetopplistan) | 13 |
| UK Albums (Official Charts) | 28 |
| US Billboard 200 | 15 |

== Certifications ==
| Region | Certification | Certified units/sales |
|---|---|---|
| Australia (ARIA) | Gold | 35,000^{^} |
| Austria (IFPI Austria) | Gold | 25,000^{*} |
| Canada (Music Canada) | Platinum | 100,000^{^} |
| Germany (BVMI) | Gold | 250,000^{^} |
| Japan (RIAJ) | Platinum | 200,000^{^} |
| Switzerland (IFPI Switzerland) | Gold | 25,000^{^} |
| Taiwan (RIT) | Gold | 20,000 |
| United States (RIAA) | Platinum | 1,200,000 |
^{*} Sales figures based on certification alone.^{^} Shipments figures based on certification alone.
