= Mr. Big (Mr. Big album) =

Studio album by Mr. Big
- Released: June 20, 1989; July 10, 1989 (Japan)
- Studios: Fantasy, Berkeley, California
- Genres: Hard rock; pop metal
- Length: 46:54
- Label: Atlantic
- Producer: Kevin Elson

Mr. Big chronology
Mr. Big (1989)	Lean into It (1991)

Singles from Mr. Big
- 1. "Addicted to That Rush" Released: August 1989

Mr. Big is the debut album by the American rock band Mr. Big. Produced by Kevin Elson, the album proved a partial commercial success, reaching the 46th slot on the Billboard 200 chart. Lead-off single "Addicted to that Rush", featuring the band's aggressive guitar and bass playing, also brought the group some mainstream attention, reaching the No. 39 slot on the Billboard Mainstream Rock chart. 300,000 copies were sold, according to a Musician magazine interview with Mr. Big in 1990.

Several of the songs from the album became live staples of the band, and have since been included in various live albums. The group followed up the album with Lean Into It in 1991.

The song "30 Days in the Hole" was originally recorded by British rock band Humble Pie on the 1972 album Smokin'. Bassist Billy Sheehan revealed on an interview on Nikki Sixx's radio show "Sixx Sense" that "Wind Me Up" is based on "Oh, Pretty Woman" by Roy Orbison played backwards.

== Critical reception ==
Professional ratings
Review scores
Source	Rating
AllMusic	4/5 stars
Chicago Tribune	3/4 stars
Collector's Guide to Heavy Metal	6/10
Rock Hard	8.0/10

The Chicago Tribune opined that "the lyrics are strictly by-the-numbers, but the playing is hard, flashy and tuneful, combining Bad Company's bluesiness with Def Leppard's melodic metal."

== Track listing ==
No.	Title	Writer(s)	Length
1.	"Addicted to That Rush"	Paul Gilbert; Billy Sheehan; Pat Torpey	4:46
2.	"Wind Me Up"	Eric Martin; Gilbert; Torpey	4:11
3.	"Merciless"	Gilbert; Martin; Torpey	3:57
4.	"Had Enough"	Sheehan	4:57
5.	"Blame It on My Youth"	Gilbert; Martin; Sheehan	4:14
6.	"Take a Walk"	Gilbert; Martin; Sheehan	3:57
7.	"Big Love"	Martin	4:49
8.	"How Can You Do What You Do"	Jonathan Cain; Martin	3:58
9.	"Anything for You"	Gilbert; Martin; Sheehan	4:37
10.	"Rock & Roll Over"	Martin	3:50
11.	"30 Days in the Hole" (Humble Pie cover)	Steve Marriott	4:12
Total length:			46:54

2009 Japanese remastered edition bonus tracks
No.	Title	Writer(s)	Length
12.	"Merciless" (Demo)	Gilbert; Martin; Torpey	3:57
13.	"How Can You Do What You Do" (Demo)	Cain; Martin	4:02

== Personnel ==
Mr. Big

- Eric Martin – lead vocals
- Paul Gilbert – guitar, vocals
- Billy Sheehan – bass guitar, vocals
- Pat Torpey – drums, vocals

Production

- Kevin Elson – producer, engineer, mixing
- Tom Size, Wally Buck – additional engineers
- Bob Ludwig – mastering at Masterdisk, New York

== Charts ==
Chart (1989)	Peak position
Australian Albums (ARIA)	122
Canada Top Albums/CDs (RPM)	73
Japanese Albums (Oricon)	22
Swedish Albums (Sverigetopplistan)	34
UK Albums (Official Charts)	60
US Billboard 200	46

== Certifications ==
Region	Certification	Certified units/sales
Japan (RIAJ)	Gold	100,000^{^}
^{^} Shipments figures based on certification alone.
