= Technical Difficulties (Racer X album) =

Studio album by Racer X
- Released: December 8, 1999
- Recorded: Batgirl Studio in Las Vegas, Nevada; Rec Room
- Genre: Heavy metal
- Length: 50:07
- Label: Mercury
- Producer: Paul Gilbert

Racer X chronology
Extreme Volume II Live (1992)	Technical Difficulties (1999)	Superheroes (2000)

Technical Difficulties is the third studio album by heavy metal band Racer X, released on December 8, 1999 through Mercury Records (Japan), and on April 25, 2000 through Shrapnel Records (United States) and Mascot Records (Europe). The album's title track evolved from the introductory song "Metal Dog" on guitarist Paul Gilbert's 1995 instructional video Terrifying Guitar Trip; it later appeared in the 2009 video game Brütal Legend, "B.R.O." stands for "Bach Rip-Off", a homage to a previous track, "Y.R.O." (Yngwie Rip-Off"), from the band's 1986 debut album Street Lethal.

== Track listing ==
No.	Title	Writer(s)	Length
1.	"Phallic Tractor" (instrumental)	Paul Gilbert, Scott Travis	0:56
2.	"Fire of Rock"	Gilbert	4:56
3.	"Snakebite"	Jeff Martin, Gilbert, Travis	4:23
4.	"Technical Difficulties" (instrumental)	Gilbert, Travis	4:20
5.	"Miss Mistreater"	Martin, Bruce Bouillet	4:31
6.	"Bolt in My Heart"	Martin, Gilbert	4:10
7.	"17th Moon"	Martin, Gilbert, Travis	4:06
8.	"Waiting"	Martin	4:29
9.	"Poison Eyes"	Gilbert, Martin, Bouillet	4:17
10.	"B.R.O."	Johann Sebastian Bach; arr. Gilbert	1:20
11.	"God of the Sun"	Martin, Russ Parrish	5:16
12.	"Give It to Me"	Bouillet, Martin, Gilbert	3:15
13.	"The Executioner's Song"	Martin, Gilbert, Travis	4:08
Total length:			50:07

Japanese/European edition bonus track
No.	Title	Writer(s)	Length
14.	"Children of the Grave" (Black Sabbath cover)	Tony Iommi, Bill Ward, Geezer Butler, Ozzy Osbourne	5:15

== Personnel ==
- Jeff Martin – vocals
- Paul Gilbert – guitar, producer
- Scott Travis – drums
- John Alderete – bass
- Tom Size – engineering, mixing
- Damon Gold – engineering
- Steve Hall – mastering

== Charts ==
Chart (1999)	Peak position
Japanese Albums (Oricon)	32
