= Shark Island (band) =

American glam metal band

- Origin: Los Angeles, California, US
- Genre: Glam metal
- Years active: 1979–1992, 2017–present
- Labels: Mystic, A&M, Epic, MCA, Frontiers, Manifest Music

Shark Island is an American glam metal band from Los Angeles, California, that formed in 1986 and reformed in 2017 and is currently touring clubs and hair metal festivals in Europe. The band are mainly known for their "cult hit" album, Law of the Order.

== History ==
=== 1979–1982: Sharks ===
Sharks started in 1979 by vocalist Rick Czerny and lead guitarist, Spencer Sercombe. Czerny and Sercombe met in high school playing together and began writing original material. Spencer eventually began working for B.C. Rich guitars. While working at B.C. Rich, Spencer had a hand in the designing of one their most popular guitars, The Warlock.

The band practiced out of a small home in a commercial area in Arcadia on Santa Clara Street. The walls of the studio were lined with empty Mickey's Big Mouth bottles, the official Sharks beer and the inspiration behind the band's original logo. The band was completed by drummer Dave Bishop from the Maryland suburbs of Washington DC.

The original band of Czerny, Sercombe and Bishop released an independent album called Altar Ego in 1982. This album was produced by Jerry Tolman, and featured organist Mike "The Fin" Finnegan. Both had done work with Stephen Stills. It was recorded and mixed by Rick Holbrook at That Studio in North Hollywood.

As well as Altar Ego, Sharks released three singles. The first was a unique "triple fin-shaped" 45, that when inserted into the jacket, cut through the ocean image on the cover. Side A was "Kid Sister" and Side B was "Your Car or Mine." Both were recorded at Mystic Studios in Hollywood. "Hey" was a live single recorded on May 10, 1981, at The Ice House in Pasadena, Sharks' hometown. On the flip side was Mark Bolan's "Bang a Gong (Get It On)". The artwork of "Hey" featured a black 45 rpm sleeve with "Live Sharks" across the top in bold red letters with three USDA stamps stating "Guaranteed Live" on the top of the stamp. "Packed in Its Own Juice" was on the bottom of the stamp.

In the middle of the stamp it said, "U.S.D.A. Shark Meat Choice" looking like an actual stamp from the U.S.D.A. The other single was "I'm Electric" which featured a drum machine rather than Bishop playing real and live drums. On the backside of that single is "Santa Claus Is Coming to Town". The lyrics are substituted and recorded to the tune of the Judas Priest song, "Heading Out to the Highway".

No artwork was created for this second single. This was considered a "souvenir" and was given out to the fans when Sharks headlined. Oftentimes, Sharks made themselves available after their performances to the dozens of fans who wanted, and somewhat demanded, autographs to these same "souvenirs."

During those years, Sharks became one of the most popular bands to emerge from the Los Angeles glam metal scene. The Hollywood scene was alive those years, and the Sharks shared bills with various heavy metal acts such as Mötley Crüe, Quiet Riot, and the Michael Schenker Group in venues like The Whiskey, The Icehouse, The Roxy or The Troubadour.

Rick Czerny, who later changed his name to Richard Black, had his unique and signature stage moves and dancing that influenced Axl Rose. Dave Bishop was the drummer of Sharks while they were enjoying the height of their popularity in Hollywood. Bishop used various shapes and sizes of cowbell. His drum kit had a shark's jaws fastened to his bass drum facing the crowd.

=== 1985–1986: Name change and S'cool Buss ===
In 1985, Sharks changed their name to Shark Island. They became the house band at Gazzari's on the Sunset Strip. Owner Bill Gazzari helped produce a cover of the Frank Sinatra song "New York, New York" which appeared on the band's independently released album, S'cool Buss, in 1986. The line-up now included Richard Black on lead vocals, Spencer "Burner" Sercombe on guitar/vocals, Walt Woodward III (ex-Rachel, Americade) on drums/vocals, Tom Rucci on bass/vocals/keyboards and Michael Guy on guitar/bass. Rick Derringer produced most of the album and there were 1,200 copies made (200 in a red cover and 1,000 in a turquoise color). "Palace of Pleasure" was the unofficial single of this album. The former Sharks' rhythm section, Dave Bishop (drums) are credited with co-writing four of the nine songs.

Shark Island were able to secure a record development deal. They were signed by A&M Records for one year with no promise of a record contract. During this time, the line-up continued to shift with drummer Walt Woodward III leaving to join the Scream. and the departure of guitarist K.K. Martin. Rob Pace, from Chicago, filled in on drums during this time. Sercombe also did studio work with Sparks, playing guitar on the band's 1988 Interior Design album.

=== 1989–1994: Law of the Order, Bill & Ted's Excellent Adventure and Point Break ===
Chris Heilman and drummer Greg Ellis joined in 1989 to record and release the band's first album: Law of the Order. The single, "Paris Calling", had an elaborate music video. Randy Nicklaus was the producer for Epic Records. The band's live energy was not fully captured in the studio.

With the disappointing CD sales of the album and no promotion from Epic Records, the band vanished from the scene with most of its members joining other projects. Law of the Order was re-issued in 2004 by French independent label, Bad Reputation, as a double CD. That included bonus tracks culled from the July 14, 1989 Bastille Day - Alive At The Whiskey EP, "Father Time" and "Dangerous" from the 1989 Bill & Ted's Excellent Adventure soundtrack, "My City" from the 1991 Point Break soundtrack, and LOTO era live cuts, "Spellbound' and "Sanctuary".

In 1994, the band attempted to re-form with the new line-up of Ricky Ricardo on bass, Eric Ragno (Takara, Seven Witches) - keyboards, Richard Black - vocals, Simon Wright (AC/DC, Dio) - drums and Damir Simic Shine on guitar.

=== 1991–2012: Solo projects ===
- Richard Black went on to join short-lived supergroup Contraband in 1991, with Michael Schenker and Bobby Blotzer (Ratt), Share Pedersen (Vixen) and Tracii Guns (L.A. Guns). Black started a band called Black 13 in the mid-1990s but never released any albums. In late 2000, it was announced that Black would front Bourgeois Pigs, a band put together by guitarist Michael Guy (ex-Shark Island, Fire, House of Lords) and also featuring Jake E. Lee (ex-Ozzy Osbourne, Badlands) on lead guitar and Tony Franklin (ex-the Firm, Blue Murder) on bass. Ultimately, the band disbanded without releasing an album.
- Spencer Sercombe teamed up with German guitar legend Michael Schenker and appeared on the 1992 MSG acoustic album Unplugged Live. In 1993, he recorded the Love Revolution EP with Jamie Rio And Newmatic Slam. He joined the Riverdogs for a European tour in 1994 and collaborated with the band's vocalist Rob Lamothe on his 1996 debut solo album, Gravity. Sercombe and Riverdogs drummer Ronnie Ciago both joined former Black Sabbath drummer Bill Ward's solo band although only Ciago appears on the 1997 When the Bough Breaks album. Sercombe also played in a ZZ Top tribute band called Fandango. He later moved to Germany, guesting on Gigantor's 2001 album, 'Back to the Rockets, and singer/guitarist Eddie St. James' 2013 release, Streets Cry Freedom, with whom he has also done shows as an acoustic guitar duo.
- Greg Ellis left the band and played in Michael Monroe's band and in Jerusalem Slim, featuring Monroe and guitarist Steve Stevens. They released one self-titled album in 1992. Ellis went on to form world music duo Vas with Iranian born vocalist Azam Ali, releasing a total of 4 albums between 1997 and 2004. He guested on Steve Stevens' 1999 solo album, Flamenco A Go-Go. Ellis has also recorded with Psytrance act Juno Reactor and his own ambient group, Biomusique, who issued 10,000 Steps in 2008.
- Chris Heilman has previously been in Tormé and went on to play guitar with Chromosapien with Doni Castello from Burning Tree on vocals, bassist Dan Rothchild, formerly of Tonic, guitarist Craig McCloskey, and LA session drummer Dan Potruch.
- Walt Woodward III joined the Scream and appeared on their Let It Scream debut album before doing a stint with surf guitar legend Dick Dale. Returning to his native New Jersey, he played in various local bands, including The Painkillers. Woodward died June 8, 2010, from liver failure.

=== 2005–2013: Gathering of the Faithful and new line-up ===
In 2005, Shark Island reunited to re-record various previously written and demoed songs for the album Gathering of the Faithful, produced by guitarist Spencer Sercombe with additional production from German Villacorta and vocalist Richard Black. The line-up featured Black on vocals, Sercombe on guitars, piano, synthesizer and vocals, Christian Heilman on bass and new drummer, Glen Sobel, now with Alice Cooper. The album was released in Europe on Frontiers Records in 2006 and via Manifest Music in the U.S. in 2007.

In 2013, Black put together a new line-up of Shark Island and played classic-era material in Europe including a show in Zagreb, Croatia.

=== 2019–present: New studio album ===
In 2019, the band released a new studio album, Bloodline. The album was limited to a worldwide print of only 1111 copies. The Shark Island family now consists of Richard Black (vocals), Damir Šimić-Shime (guitar), Alen Frjlak (drums) and returning Shark Island member Christian Heilmann (bass). Credit is also given to Marko Karacic (bass). Bloodline was produced by Alex Kane mixed by Sylvia Massy. The collection has ten original songs and one cover of "Policy of Truth" by Depeche Mode.

== Personnel ==
=== Current members ===
- Richard Black – lead vocals
- August Zadra – guitar
- Alex Kane – guitar
- Christian Heilmann – bass
- Mike Dupke – drums

=== Former members ===
- Spencer Sercombe – guitar, keyboards, vocals
- Damir Šimić-Shime - guitar
- Greg Ellis – drums
- Alen Frljak – drums
- Michael Guy – guitar, bass guitar
- Tom Rucci – bass guitar, keyboards, backing vocals
- Walt Woodward III – drums
- Jimi Brand - bass guitar
- Dave Bishop – drums
- Robert 'RP' Pace – drums

== Discography ==
=== Studio albums ===
- Altar Ego (1981)
- S'cool Buss (1986)
- Law of the Order (1989)
- Gathering of the Faithful (2006)
- Bloodline (2019)
- Bloodline 2.020 (2020)

=== Promotional EPs ===
- July 14, 1989 Bastille Day - Alive at the Whiskey (1989)

=== Singles ===
- "Kid Sister" b/w "Your Car or Mine" (1980)
- "Hey" b/w "Get It On" (1981)
- "I'm Electric" b/w "Santa Claus Is Coming to Town" (1983)
- "Paris Calling" (1989)
- "Bad For Each Other" (1990)
- "Spellbound" (1990)

=== Soundtrack appearances ===
Title	Release	Soundtrack
"Father Time"	1989	Bill & Ted's Excellent Adventure
"Dangerous"	1989	Bill & Ted's Excellent Adventure
"My City"	1991	Point Break
