= Let It Scream =

1991 studio album by the Scream

Studio album by The Scream
- Released: 1991
- Recorded: Conway Studios; Ocean Way Studios; Track Record; American Studios
- Genre: Hard rock
- Length: 50:59
- Label: Hollywood
- Producer: Eddie Kramer

The Scream chronology
Let It Scream (1991)	Takin' It to The Next Level (1992)

Let It Scream is the first album of the American hard rock band The Scream. It was the only album by the band to be officially released by a major record company.

The song "I Don't Care" was co-written by the band's original drummer Scott Travis, who left The Scream, who were at the time known as Saints Or Sinners, to replace drummer Dave Holland in Judas Priest before Let It Scream was recorded.

After this album, vocalist John Corabi left The Scream to replace Vince Neil in Mötley Crüe.

Also after this album, former Dashboard Mary lead vocalist Billy Fogarty replaced John Corabi in The Scream, and the band made a radical change in their musical style.

Many of the songs on this album were performed by the band in concert before this album was recorded.

The song "You Are All I Need" features backing vocals by then Badlands members Ray Gillen and Jeff Martin. Jeff Martin had also been in the band Racer X with The Scream members Bruce Bouillet, John Alderete, and Scott Travis.

== Track list ==
All songs written by The Scream, except where noted.

1. "Outlaw" – 3:23
2. "I Believe in Me" – 3:45
3. "Man in the Moon" (The Scream, Jamie Brown) – 5:40
4. "Father, Mother, Son" – 4:16
5. "Give It Up" – 4:35
6. "Never Loved Her Anyway" – 3:22
7. "Tell Me Why" – 3:42
8. "Love's Got a Hold on Me" – 3:57
9. "I Don't Care" (The Scream, Jamie Brown, Scott Travis) – 5:28
10. "Every Inch a Woman" – 3:34
11. "You Are All I Need" – 5:47
12. "Catch Me If You Can" – 3:26
13. "Young & Dumb" - 3:24 (Bonus Track)

== Personnel ==
Band

- John Corabi – lead vocals, acoustic guitar
- Bruce Bouillet – electric guitar, acoustic guitar, lapsteel guitar
- John Alderete – bass, acoustic bass, vocals
- Walt Woodward III – drums, percussion, vocals

Additional musicians

- Bill Bergman – saxophone on "I Believe in Me" and "Tell Me Why"
- Phill Chennell – strings on "Father, Mother, Son" and clavinet on "Tell Me Why"
- Ray Gillen – backing vocals on "You Are All I Need"
- Jeff Martin – backing vocals on "You Are All I Need"
- Jimmy Waldo – Hammond B-3 on "You Are All I Need" and "Love's Got A Hold On Me"
