= Jeff Martin (American musician) =

American rock musician

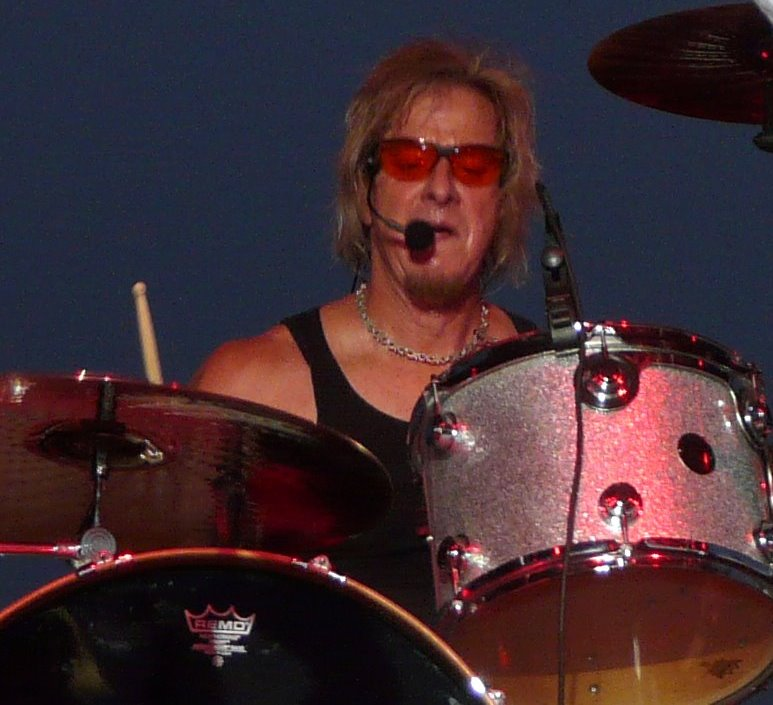
- Martin performing with Dokken in 2008

Background information
- Born: Jeffery Louis Martin
- Genres: Hard rock, blues rock, heavy metal, speed metal
- Occupation: Musician
- Instruments: Vocals, drums
- Years active: 1982–present

Jeffery Louis Martin is an American singer and drummer who has sung for the rock bands Racer X, Bad Dog, Surgical Steel and St. Michael and played drums for the bands Badlands, the Michael Schenker Group, Blindside Blues Band, Red Sea, St. Michael and The Electric Fence, a side project with Paul Gilbert and Russ Parrish. Jeff Martin played drums for Paul Gilbert, George Lynch, Dokken, and P.K. Mitchell. Jeff became the new drummer of the Greg Golden Band in February 2023.

Martin played drums in Surgical Steel before switching to lead vocals and was the drummer/lead vocalist for St. Michael, both of these being Phoenix, AZ-based bands that also featured his future Badlands bandmate Greg Chaisson.

He released a lone solo album in 2006, The Fool, featuring the guitar talents of Paul Gilbert and Michael Schenker and has also sung backing vocals for Judas Priest and The Scream.

Martin appeared in the 1985 movie Thunder Alley, starring Leif Garrett, with his band Surgical Steel.

== Discography ==
=== Solo ===
- The Fool (2006)

=== Racer X ===
- Street Lethal (1986)
- Second Heat (1987)
- Extreme Volume Live (1988)
- Extreme Volume II Live (1992)
- Technical Difficulties (1999)
- Superheroes (2000)
- Live at the Whisky: Snowball of Doom (2001)
- Getting Heavier (2002)
- Official Bootleg: Snowball of Doom 2 (2002)

=== Badlands ===
- Voodoo Highway (1991)
- Dusk (1998)

=== Blindside Blues Band ===
- Blindside Blues Band (1993)
- Blindsided (1994)
- Messenger of the Blues (1995)

=== Red Sea ===
- Blood (1994)

=== Paul Gilbert ===
- King of Clubs (1998)
- Beehive Live (1999)
- Alligator Farm (2000)

=== The Michael Schenker Group ===
- Be Aware of Scorpions (2001)
- Tales of Rock'n'Roll (2006)

=== Guest appearances ===
- Judas Priest – Turbo (1986)
- The Scream – Let It Scream (1991)
- Various artists – Jeffology – A Guitar Chronicle (1995)
- Craig Erickson – Two Sides of the Blues (1995)
- Black Symphony – Breathe (1996)
- Paul Gilbert & Jimi Kidd – Raw Blues Power (2002)
- Pete Way & Michael Schenker – The Plot (2003)
- George Lynch – Furious George (2004)
- Kevin DuBrow – In for the Kill (2004)
- Pat Travers – P.T. Power Trio 2 (2005)
- Frost – Out in the Cold (2005)
- Indigenous – Time Is Coming (2014)
- Empires of Eden – Architect of Hope (2015)
- Rev Jones – Bakwash (2018)

=== Demos ===
- Surgical Steel – 3-song demo (1982)
- Surgical Steel – 6-song demo (1984)
- Bad Dog – demo (1990)
- Leatherwolf – 3-song demo (2004)

=== Compilations ===
- Metal Massacre II (1982) with Surgical Steel – "Rivet Head"
- U.S. Metal Vol. 4 (1984) with St. Michael – "The Beauty, The Power"
