= Superheroes (Racer X album) =

Studio album by Racer X
- Released: November 6, 2000 (Japan); February 27, 2001 (North America)
- Genre: Heavy metal
- Length: 51:20
- Label: Universal Japan
- Producer: Paul Gilbert

Racer X chronology
Technical Difficulties (1999)	Superheroes (2000)	Snowball of Doom (2002)

Professional ratings
Review scores
Source	Rating
AllMusic	4/5 stars
Metal Hammer	5/10

Superheroes is the fourth studio album by Racer X. It was released in Japan under the name "Adventure of Racer X-Men" and distributed by Universal Japan. This album was released on Paul Gilbert's 34th birthday.

== Track listing ==
No.	Title	Writer(s)	Length
1.	"Superheroes"	Racer X	4:40
2.	"Let the Spirit Fly"	Racer X	3:47
3.	"Godzilla" (Blue Öyster Cult cover)	Donald Roeser	4:50
4.	"Dead Man's Shoes"	Racer X	4:07
5.	"King of the Monsters"	Racer X	4:49
6.	"Mad at the World"	Racer X	4:00
7.	"Evil Joe"	Racer X	3:59
8.	"That Hormone Thing"	Racer X	4:36
9.	"Viking Kong"	Racer X	5:02
10.	"Time Before the Sun"	Jeff Martin, Mike Onesko	7:14
Total length:			47:10

Japanese/European edition bonus track
No.	Title	Writer(s)	Length
11.	"O.H.B." (One Hot Bitch)	Racer X	4:10
Total length:			51:20

== Personnel ==
- Jeff Martin – vocals
- Paul Gilbert – guitars
- John Alderete – bass
- Scott Travis – drums

Production

- William Hames – photography
- Bruce Bouillet – mixing
- Paul Gilbert – audio production, engineer

== Charts ==
Chart (2000)	Peak position
Japanese Albums (Oricon)	35

== Trivia ==
- The song "Mad at the World" uses the same chord progression (but in a lower tuning) as "My Kinda Woman" by Mr. Big which was released on Lean into It.
- The song "Godzilla" is a cover of Blue Öyster Cult, and includes a brief interpolation of David Bowie's "Fame".
- The album was mixed by former Racer X guitar player Bruce Bouillet.
- The track "Evil Joe" contains samples from a prank call made by a friend of Gilbert's to Joe Aufricht of the black metal band Satanicon. The call in its entirety appears as a bonus track on Mushroomhead's 1999 album M3 under the title "Dark and Evil Joe".
