= YRO =

YRO can refer to

- Ottawa/Rockcliffe Airport, the IATA airport code
- A Slashdot sub-section on politics, Your Rights Online
- Y.R.O., a song by Racer X on their 1986 album Street Lethal
