= Thunder Alley (1985 film) =

- Theatrical release poster
- Directed by: J. S. Cardone
- Written by: J. S. Cardone
- Produced by: Bill Ewing
- Starring: Roger Wilson; Jill Schoelen; Scott McGinnis; Cindy Eilbacher; Clancy Brown; Leif Garrett
- Cinematography: Karen Grossman
- Edited by: Daniel Wetherbee
- Music by: Robert Folk
- Production company: The Cannon Group, Inc.
- Distributed by: The Cannon Group, Inc.
- Release date: August 1, 1985
- Running time: 111 minutes
- Country: United States
- Language: English

Thunder Alley is a 1985 American drama film written and directed by J. S. Cardone and starring Leif Garrett, Roger Wilson, Jill Schoelen, Scott McGinnis, Cindy Eilbacher and Clancy Brown. The film was released on August 1, 1985, by The Cannon Group, Inc.

== Plot ==
Arizona youth Richie lives on his dad's farm helping him with his cotton crops. When in town running an errand for his father, he runs into Lorraine the girlfriend of his long time best friend Donnie. She tells him that Donnie's band is currently auditioning to play at a club in town.

Richie goes to the club to hear them as they just brought in a new guitar player as Richie is a guitar player as well. The club owner gives them two nights the following week. Donnie tells Richie that he should be playing for them.

Richie and Donnie go out that night to THE club in town, The Palace, to check out the band playing there "Surgical Steel", an actual Phoenix metal band featuring future Racer X singer and Badlands drummer Jeff Martin and future Badlands bassist Greg Chaisson. Unbeknownst to Richie, Lorraine has set him up to meet her fellow worker, Beth. Richie and she enjoy spending the rest of the evening together until her father, very much intoxicated, yells at both of them as they are saying goodnight.

Richie goes to see the band perform that next week. When the crowd gets restless waiting for them to come on stage, Richie goes backstage to find out the new guitar player is passed out in the bathroom. Despite objection from the band's lead singer Skip, Richie agrees to sit in with the band as the owner of The Palace, known as the Fatman, had agreed to see the show for future consideration to play at his club. The Fatman agrees to send them on a short tour of out of town clubs to see how audiences react with a man named Weasel managing them. The tour goes well, and the band gets to start performing at the Palace. Richie and Beth grow closer while Donnie begins to alienate Richie, Lorraine and the rest of the band by doing drugs causing him to be late for performances and playing off key. Richie finally confronts him about the situation. Donnie promises Richie it will never happen only for Richie to be awakened later that night by his mother telling him that Donnie has died from an overdose. Richie quickly discovers it was ultimately the Fatman who supplied Donnie with the drugs that led to his overdose prompting him to confront the Fatman and smash his car up with a hammer. Richie then completely loses his desire to play in the band. He remains isolated at his home. With an important concert approaching in which record promoters and producers are attending, he remains adamant about not playing even after hearing convincing pleas from Beth and Weasel. Butch and Wolf, the bass player and drummer for the band, show up to the concert and begin playing in hopes that Richie had a change of heart. When all hope seems lost, a guitar is heard playing. To everyone's happiness, Richie had changed his mind after all. They play a song dedicated to Donnie to the crowd's rousing cheers and applause and Skip rejoins Richie and the band onstage for one final song.

== Cast ==
- Roger Wilson as Richie
- Jill Schoelen as Beth
- Scott McGinnis as Donnie
- Cindy Eilbacher as Lorraine
- Clancy Brown as "Weasel"
- Leif Garrett as Skip
- Phil Brock as Butch
- Brian Cole as Wolf
- Bert Kramer as Richie's Father
- Elizabeth Huddle as Richie's Mother
- John A. Dragon as Brad
- Randy Polk as "Fatman"
- Carol Kottenbrook as Candy
- Melanie Kinnaman as Star
- Robert Curtin as Beth's Father
- Henry Kendrick as Jake
- Frederick Flynn as "Ace"
- Richard Rubio as Joey
- Jeff Martin as Jeff
- Wink Sargent as Preppy
- Cheryl Waters as Cowgirl
