= Big Sir (duo) =

American band

- Origin: Los Angeles, California, U.S.
- Genres: Pop music, experimental music
- Years active: 2000-2016
- Label: Gold Standard Laboratories
- Spinoff of: The Mars Volta
- Past members: Juan Alderete; Lisa Papineau

Big Sir was an American musical duo from Los Angeles, California. It was founded in 2000 by Juan Alderete (The Mars Volta and Racer X) and singer Lisa Papineau. Big Sir recorded a total of four albums between then and 2014. The duo began when Papineau's previous band, Pet, dissolved in the late 1990s. The duo released a self-titled album in 2000, but did not release any more projects until 2006 due to Alderete's involvement with the Mars Volta.

== Discography ==
- Big Sir (2000)
- Und Die Scheiße Ändert Sich Immer (2006)
- Before Gardens After Gardens (2012)
- Digital Gardens (2014)

== Other releases ==
- Now That's What I Call Big Sir (2001)
