= In for the Kill =

In for the Kill may refer to:

- In for the Kill!, a 1974 album by Budgie
- In for the Kill (Kevin DuBrow album), 2004
- "In for the Kill" (song), a 2009 song by La Roux
- In for the Kill, a 1995 album by The Independents
- "In for the Kill", a song by Black Sabbath from Seventh Star
- "In for the Kill", a song by Winger from Pull
- "In for the Kill", a song by Grailknights from Alliance
- "In for the Kill", a song by Electric Light Orchestra
- "In for the Kill", a song by Pro-Pain from Act of God
- "In for the Kill", a band featuring Bill Gaal of Nothingface
