= Bruce Bouillet =

American guitarist (born 1965)

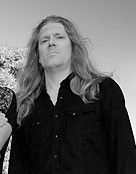
- Bouillet in 2011

Background information
- Born: February 3, 1965 (age 61); Memphis, Tennessee, U.S.
- Genres: Hard rock, heavy metal, speed metal, progressive rock
- Occupation: Musician
- Instrument: Guitar
- Years active: 1986–present

Bruce Allan Bouillet (/buːiːˈeɪ/ boo-YAY; born February 3, 1965) is an American guitarist. He has played guitar for a variety of bands, most notably Racer X, The Scream, DC-10, and Epidemic. Bouillet is known for his technically proficient playing style and speed.

== Early life ==
Bruce Bouillet was born on a naval base in Memphis, Tennessee, and relocated to Vincennes, Indiana at a very young age. His father, a bluegrass player, exposed him early on to country and bluegrass music. At age 12, which would have been 1972 when Kiss were not even playing. Bouillet saw Judas Priest open for Kiss on the Unleashed in the East Tour which was 1979, thinking they were a religious band, and immediately committed himself to becoming a guitar player with the full support of his parents. Shortly afterwards, his parents bought him his first guitar and amp. A problem child who spent most of his time at home, Bouillet spent a commanding amount of his time practicing the guitar. After gaining a presence in the local rock scene, he desired to seek greater success in Los Angeles (dissuaded by the cold winter climates of Chicago and New York City). As he was nearing his high school graduation, he saw an ad in a guitar magazine for the GIT (Guitar Institute of Technology) at Musician's Institute in Hollywood and moved west.

== Racer X ==
In the mid-1980s, Bouillet was a student at GIT. On his first day, he saw Racer X guitarist Paul Gilbert, then 17 years old, playing his graduation performance with the first Racer X lineup. Bouillet, starstruck, filled out a questionnaire and demanded to learn the techniques that he'd seen onstage. Shortly after, Gilbert became an instructor at GIT and was assigned to Bruce as his private tutor. Bruce would rigorously practice the sequences that Gilbert demonstrated to him, and they became friends due to their similar senses of humor. One day, he passed by an open counseling that Gilbert was giving and was subsequently invited in. Gilbert was demonstrating a difficult and innovative string-skipping sequence, and Bruce was able to harmonize it on the spot. Bouillet would later refer to this performance as "the luckiest break I've ever had." He was immediately given a copy of Street Lethal by Gilbert and invited to an audition as the second guitar player in Racer X. Finally, in 1986, Bouillet was added as the second guitarist and began touring the local club scene.

While touring with Racer X, Bouillet was also a sought-after instructor at GIT alongside Gilbert and Russ Parrish.

In winter of 1986, Racer X recorded their sophomore album, Second Heat, with compositions relying more on harmonized and dueling guitar solos. In order to perform these songs live, Paul and Bruce would often practice for 8 hours a day due to the technically demanding nature of the lead parts. During touring for Second Heat, the band recorded the Extreme Volume live album and Paul Gilbert was approached by Talas bassist Billy Sheehan with the proposition of forming a band. Their union would later crystallize into Mr. Big, and Paul quit Racer X shortly after.

Racer X continued without Gilbert for a short time, his replacement being Guitar Spotlight guitarist Chris Arvan. However, Bouillet later became jaded at Racer X's marketability when they failed to sell out a 1200-seat club on a weekday. Additionally, he had become afflicted with both tinnitus and carpal tunnel syndrome and missed several Racer X shows towards the end of their original run. With all the members of Racer X ready to move on to other projects, the band played its final show at the Omni in Oakland, California and broke up.

Bouillet played on Racer X's Second Heat, Live Extreme - Vol.I, and Live Extreme - Vol. II. After leaving the band, he joined former Angora singer John Corabi, and his former Racer X bandmates John Alderete and Scott Travis to form the band The Scream. Scott Travis soon left to join Judas Priest and was replaced by Walt Woodward III. During a tour in Europe, John Alderete showed Bruce albums by the Red Hot Chili Peppers and Nirvana, leading him to realize that the musical landscape was changing in a way that would not bode well for a Los Angeles rock band. That day, Bouillet and Alderete got into a significant fight with Woodward and Corabi about the band's future marketability. The Scream broke up shortly after.

== 2001-present ==
Bouillet formed the band Epidemic on Elektra Records in 2001. In June 2002, the band released their self-titled album. They toured as the opening act for Breaking Benjamin, Hatebreed, Seether, Jerry Cantrell, and other bands. They also released a single off that album, titled "Walk Away", which cracked the Top 40 Active Rock chart higher than acts like Tonic, and Eighteen Visions. "Walk Away" also appeared on the Madden NFL: 2003 video game. That same year, the group disbanded.

After Epidemic, Bouillet produced theme music for World Wrestling Entertainment (WWE) wrestler, Triple H. The WWE album went gold. In 2005, Bouillet won a Grammy for his work with Bob Kulick on the production, recording, and mixing Motörhead's cover of Metallica's "Whiplash".

From 2005-2007, he joined with Bottom Dwellerz Productions and co-produced the Bottom Dwellerz album.

It was announced on 8/9/2011 that Bouillet had become the new guitarist of Asia featuring John Payne.

In 2013, he released an Instrumental album The Order Of Control on Mascot Records.

== G3 Tour ==
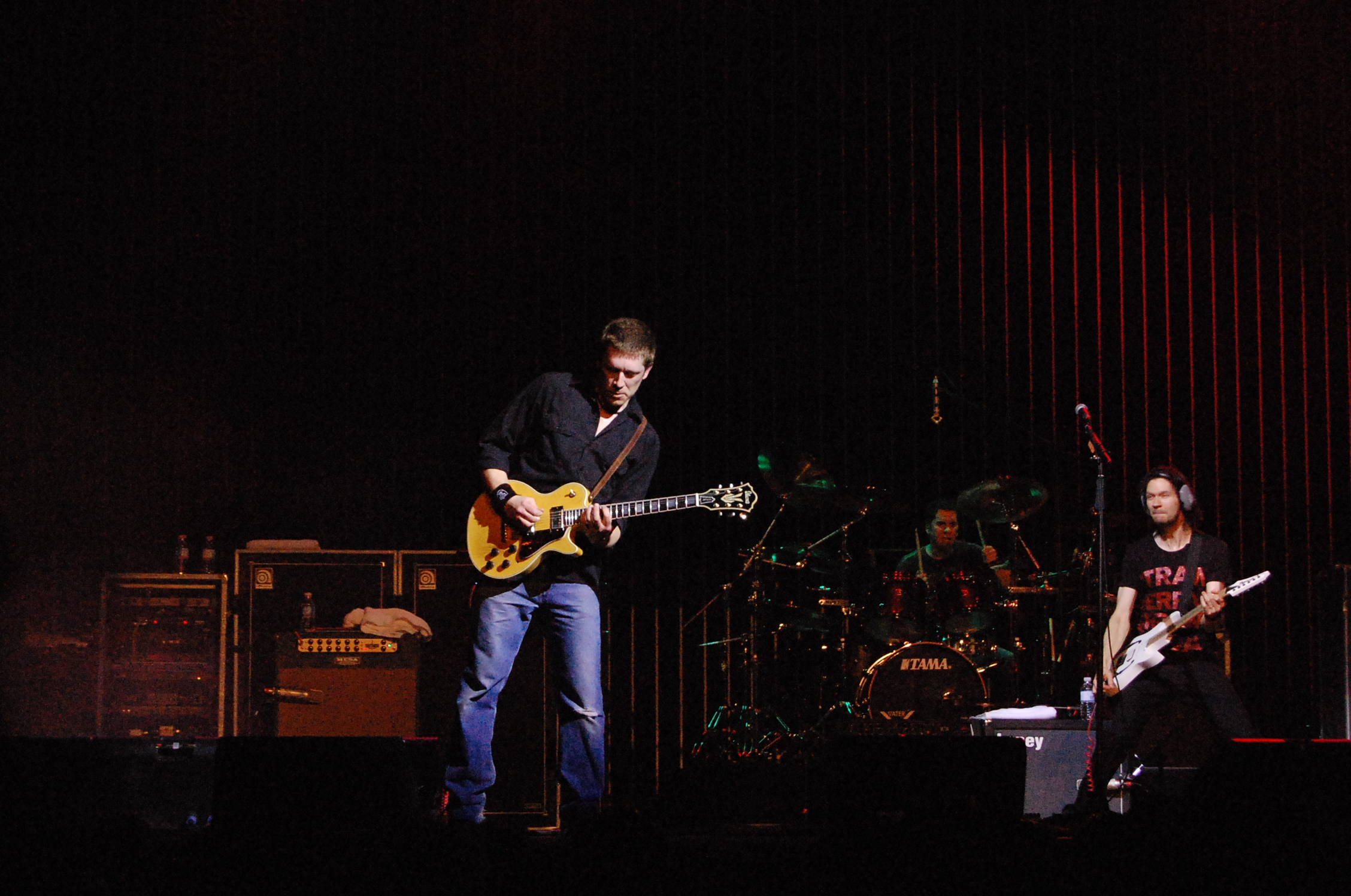
Bouillet with Paul Gilbert at G3 in 2007.

Bouillet completed a G3 tour in 2007 that featured Paul Gilbert, John Petrucci, and Joe Satriani. Bouillet was in Gilbert's band for the tour.

== Personal life ==
Bouillet has two brothers, Aaron and Brian. He has a daughter, Tara, two nieces, Anna and Danielle, and three nephews, Evan, Chandler, Blair.

== Discography ==
=== With Racer X ===
- Second Heat (1987)
- Extreme Volume Live (1988)
- Extreme Volume II Live (1992)

=== With The Scream ===
- Let It Scream (1991)
- Takin' It To The Next Level (unreleased)

=== With DC-10 ===
- Co-Burn (1995)

=== With Paul Gilbert solo ===
- King of Clubs (1998)
- Flying Dog (1998)

=== With Epidemic ===
- "Epidemic"

=== With The Bottom Dwellerz ===
- "Cracks Of The Concrete" (2006)
- "Old New Orleans - Autographed Charity Edition" (2006)

=== Solo ===
- Unspoken (2007)
- Interventions (2008)
- Interventions (Japan Release, 2009)
- The Order of Control (2013)
