= Snowball of Doom 2 =

Official Bootleg: Snowball of Doom 2

Live album by Racer X
- Released: December 18, 2002
- Genre: Heavy metal
- Length: 1:23:50
- Label: Universal Japan
- Producer: Paul Gilbert

Racer X chronology
Getting Heavier (2002)	Official Bootleg: Snowball of Doom 2 (2002)

Official Bootleg: Snowball of Doom 2 is a double album released by Racer X. It is the band's fourth live album, and was recorded in Japan. It was initially released alongside Getting Heavier.

== Track listing ==
=== Disc one ===
1. "Superheroes"
2. "Phallic Tractor"
3. "Fire Of Rock"
4. "The Executioner's Song"
5. "King of the Monsters"
6. "Dead Man's Shoes"
7. "Sunlit Nights"
8. "Into the Night"
9. "Y.R.O. (and guitar solo)"
10. "Let the spirit Fly"
11. "Waiting"

=== Disc two ===
1. "Hammer Away"
2. "Bass Solo" (John Alderete)
3. "Miss Mistreater"
4. "That Hormone Thing"
5. "Scarified"
6. "Drum Solo" (Scott Travis)
7. "Motor Man"

== Personnel ==
- Jeff Martin - vocals
- Paul Gilbert - guitar
- John Alderete - bass guitar
- Scott Travis - drums
