= King of Clubs (album) =

Studio album by Paul Gilbert
- Released: 27 November 1997 (Japan)
- Genre: Hard rock, power pop, pop rock
- Length: 56:26
- Label: Mayhem Records
- Producer: Paul Gilbert & Bruce Bouillet

Paul Gilbert chronology
| King of Clubs (1997) | Flying Dog (1998) |

Professional ratings
Review scores
| Source | Rating |
|---|---|
| Allmusic | 4/5 stars |

King of Clubs is the debut solo album by Paul Gilbert formerly of the heavy metal band Racer X and the hard rock band Mr. Big.

== Track listing ==
All songs written by Paul Gilbert except where noted.

1. "Champagne" – 3:20
2. "Vinyl" – 3:36
3. "Girls Who Can Read Your Mind" – 3:30
4. "I'm Just In Love" – 1:56
5. "The Jig" (Instrumental) – 2:24 (J. S. Bach)
6. "Girlfriend's Birthday" – 2:59
7. "Bumblebee" – 4:22
8. "Streetlights" – 4:57
9. "My Naomi" – 4:21
10. "Double Trouble" – 3:07
11. "Million Dollar Smile" – 2:19
12. "The Jam" (Instrumental) – 19:35
13. "I Do" 2:59
- Track 5 arranged by Paul Gilbert.
- Track 13 only available on the Japan release of the album.

== Musicians ==
- Paul Gilbert – vocals, guitars, piano, organ, bass guitar, tambourine and drums on track 4
- Pat Torpey – drums (Tracks 1 & 7)
- Jeff Martin – drums (Tracks 2–3, 5–6 & 8–12)
- Bruce Bouillet – Guitar (Track 12)
- John Alderete – Bass guitar (Track 12)

=== Production ===
- Bruce Bouillet – Mixing, Producer, Engineer
- Chris Bellman – Mastering
