= Second Heat =

- Cover art by Guy Aitchison

Studio album by Racer X
- Released: February 11, 1987
- Recorded: November–December 1986
- Studio: Prairie Sun Recording, Cotati, California
- Genre: Heavy metal
- Length: 35:51
- Label: Shrapnel
- Producer: Steve Fontano; Mike Varney

Racer X chronology
Street Lethal (1986)	Second Heat (1987)	Extreme Volume Live (1988)

Second Heat is the second studio album by American heavy metal band Racer X, was released on February 11, 1987, through Shrapnel Records.

The sound has drawn comparisons to Van Halen and Judas Priest.

== Critical reception ==
Professional ratings
Review scores
Source	Rating
AllMusic	4/5 stars
Collector's Guide to Heavy Metal	5/10
Rock Hard	9.0/10

In a contemporary review, Rock Hard defines Second Heat "a thoroughly convincing piece of work, which can also boast an unusually impressive production" and predicted that Paul Gilbert would be "the first Shrapnel guitarist, who will make a name for himself beyond the circle of guitar freaks."

Andy Hinds at AllMusic considered Second Heat superior to its predecessor and described it as having "some of the most amazing dual-guitar work ever recorded" thanks to the addition of second guitarist Bruce Bouillet in accompaniment with Gilbert. The rhythm section of drummer Scott Travis and bassist John Alderete was also praised as being "one of the most formidable around." Highlights listed included "Hammer Away", "Living the Hard Way" and the instrumental "Scarified". However, criticism was directed at the band's cover of "Moonage Daydream" by David Bowie: Hinds dismissed it as a "backdrop for (you guessed it!) more shredding" at the expense of "all the charm and subtlety of the original". Canadian journalist Martin Popoff found the album "hobbled by the rudimentary, cloddish, New Jersey rock club tones" and cited as the "most memorable thing about this album" the cover of Judas Priest's "Heart of a Lion", "apparently given to the band by Halford without Downing's or Tipton's knowledge."

In 2005, Second Heat was ranked No. 480 in Rock Hard magazine's book of The 500 Greatest Rock & Metal Albums of All Time.

== Track listing ==
Side one
No.	Title	Writer(s)	Length
1.	"Sacrifice"	Jeff Martin, Paul Gilbert	4:03
2.	"Gone Too Far"	Martin, Gilbert	2:55
3.	"Scarified" (instrumental)	Gilbert, Scott Travis	2:40
4.	"Sunlit Nights"	Martin, Gilbert, Bruce Bouillet	3:35
5.	"Hammer Away"	Martin, Gilbert	3:44

Side two
No.	Title	Writer(s)	Length
6.	"Heart of a Lion" (Judas Priest cover)	Glenn Tipton, K.K. Downing, Rob Halford	4:04
7.	"Motor Man"	Martin, Gilbert, Bouillet	3:46
8.	"Moonage Daydream" (David Bowie cover)	David Bowie	3:30
9.	"Living the Hard Way"	Dave Gonzales, Gilbert	3:33
10.	"Lady Killer"	Martin, Gilbert, Bouillet	4:01
Total length:			35:51

== Personnel ==
Racer X

- Jeff Martin – vocals
- Paul Gilbert – guitar
- Bruce Bouillet – guitar
- Juan Alderete – bass
- Scott Travis – drums

Additional musicians

- Mike Mani – keyboard (tracks 4, 6)

Technical

- Steve Fontano – producer, engineer
- Dino Alden – assistant engineer
- George Horn – mastering at Fantasy Studios in Berkeley, California
- Mike Varney – executive producer
- Dino Alden – coordinator
- Guy Aitchison – cover art
