= Extreme Volume II Live =

Live album by Racer X
- Released: September 8, 1992
- Venue: Country Club, Reseda, California
- Studio: Sound City Studios, Los Angeles, California
- Genre: Heavy metal
- Length: 36:54
- Label: Shrapnel
- Producer: Ron Bloom, Ricky Delena, Racer X, GGGarth, Mike Varney

Racer X chronology
Extreme Volume Live (1988)	Extreme Volume II Live (1992)	Technical Difficulties (1999)

Professional ratings
Review scores
Source	Rating
AllMusic	3/5 stars
Collector's Guide to Heavy Metal	8/10

Extreme Volume II Live is the second live album by Racer X, released by Shrapnel Records. Although it succeeds the release of Extreme Volume Live by four years, the songs on the album were actually recorded at the same time. At the time of the album's release, Racer X was on hiatus.

== Track listing ==
All songs written by Paul Gilbert and Jeff Martin except where noted.

1. "Hammer Away" – 4:10
2. "Poison Eyes" – 4:04
3. "Heart of a Lion" (K.K. Downing, Rob Halford, Glenn Tipton) – 4:36 (Judas Priest cover)
4. "Moonage Daydream" (David Bowie) – 3:17 (David Bowie cover)
5. "Sunlit Nights" (Bruce Bouillet, Gilbert, Martin) – 4:04
6. "Give It to Me" – 3:07
7. "On the Loose" – 3:02
8. "Rock It" – 5:10
9. "Detroit Rock City" (Bob Ezrin, Paul Stanley) – 5:20 (Kiss cover)

== Personnel ==
Racer X

- Jeff Martin – vocals
- Paul Gilbert – guitars
- Bruce Bouillet – guitars
- John Alderete – bass
- Scott Travis – drums

Production

- Ron Bloom, Andy Delena – producers, engineers
- GGGarth – additional production with Racer X, mixing at Devonshire Studios, Hollywood
- Stan Katayama, Jeff Demorris – mixing
- Kenneth K. Lee Jr. – mastering
- Mike Varney – executive producer
- Dwayne Allen - back photo
