= Juan Alderete =

American bassist (born 1963)

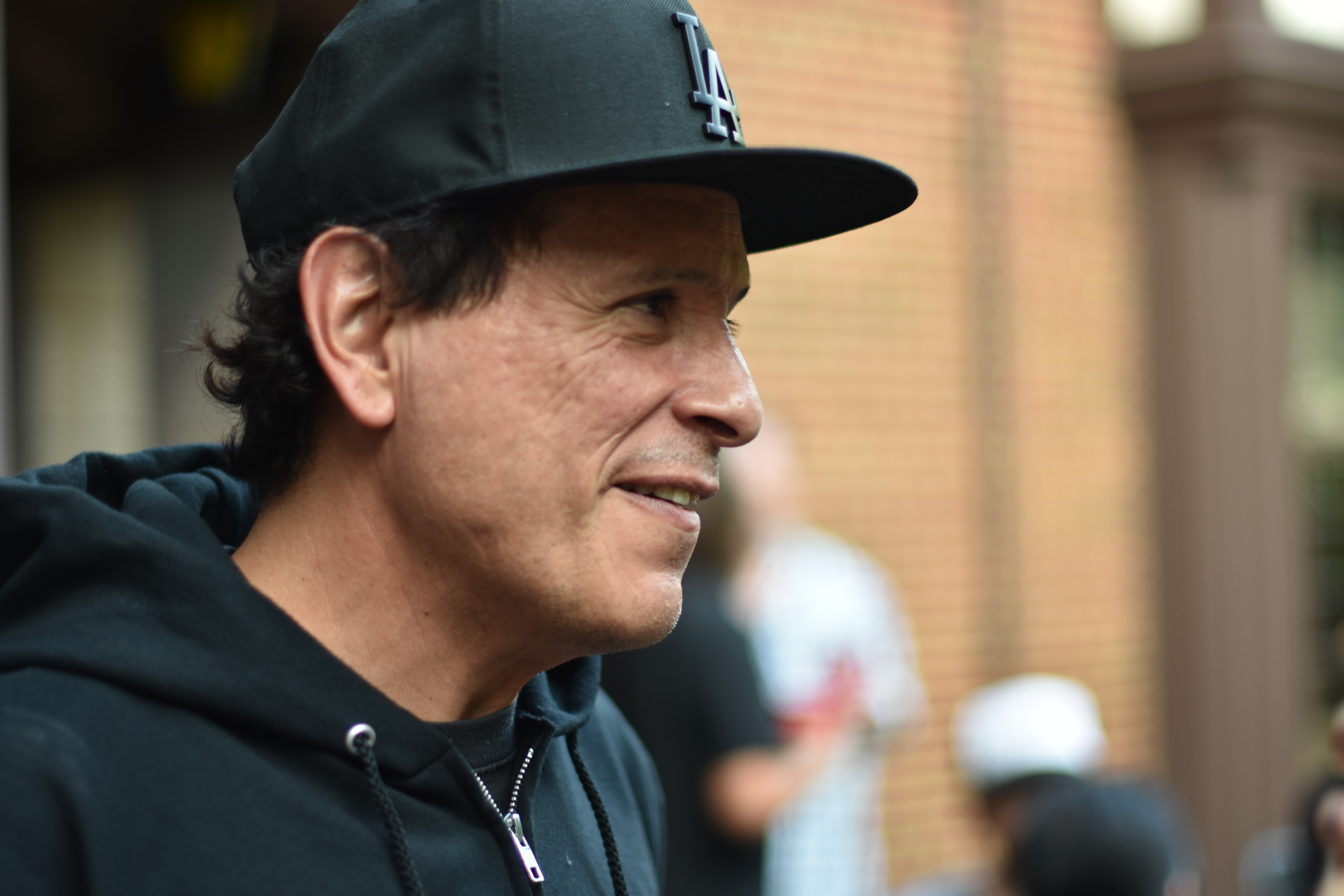
- Alderete at Earthquaker Day 2018

Background information
- Born: John Peter Alderete; September 5, 1963 (age 63); Los Angeles, California, U.S.
- Genres: Hard rock; heavy metal; progressive rock; hip-hop
- Occupation: Musician
- Instrument: Bass guitar
- Years active: 1985–present
- Member of: Big Sir; thegoodnews.; Vato Negro; Halo Orbit; Zavalaz
- Formerly of: Racer X; The Scream; The Mars Volta; Distortion Felix; Free Moral Agents; El Grupo Nuevo de Omar Rodriguez Lopez; Marilyn Manson
- Spouse: Anne Kleinedler (February 2002 – June 2025).

Juan Alderete de la Peña (born September 5, 1963) is an American bass guitarist. He is best known as the longtime bassist of both Racer X and the Mars Volta, and for his tenures touring and collaborating with Deltron 3030, Dr. Octagon and Marilyn Manson amongst others.

== Biography ==
Alderete was born in Los Angeles, California the fourth of five children of the civil rights activist Angel Manuel Alderete. Alderete was exposed to jazz music on a weekly basis by his father, who often played it around the household. Juan decided to pick up the bass after he and his friends decided to start a band. Other early influences included his brother's progressive rock albums, which included bands such as Yes, Rush, King Crimson, etc. He started learning the basics of the bass guitar when he was 16, and was influenced by such players as Jaco Pastorius, Geddy Lee, and Stanley Clarke. Some of his other influences include Jamaladeen Tacuma and John Entwistle, the bass player for the Who. His fascination with the bass guitar revolved around it being a somewhat "underappreciated" instrument at the time.

Alderete enrolled in Musicians Institute in Hollywood, Los Angeles. He enjoyed his time in the school, explaining that he was able to learn techniques and styles that he had never even considered prior to his enrollment. Alderete and fellow student Paul Gilbert started their musical relationship during an audition that Alderete held to find a drummer. Alderete showed up at the audition, bringing a Musician's Institute student and drum-playing friend named Bill Lescohier. Although Lescohier was turned down for the part, Gilbert was impressed with Alderete's bass playing; the two quickly sought to form a speed metal band that would incorporate Gilbert's advanced neoclassical metal guitar technique with Alderete's solid bass lines. To complete the band, Harry Gschoesser joined to fill the drummer position, and Jeff Martin became the vocalist; the group named themselves Racer X (a title that Lescohier had suggested). With this lineup, the band released their debut album, Street Lethal, in 1986. Alderete has been recording with Racer X ever since (note: there was a ten-year hiatus starting from 1989), and their latest album was released in 2002, titled Getting Heavier. Alderete is credited as John Alderete on all Racer X albums.

However, four years after the creation of the band, Gilbert left Racer X to form the band Mr. Big. The remaining members of Racer X decided to stay active in music, although they went their separate ways. For the next ten years, Alderete would be involved in several different bands (including the Scream, DC-10, Big Sir, and Distortion Felix) as well as becoming an instructor at Musicians Institute. Not long after, he released his first instructional video on bass techniques and modulation.

Although Extreme Volume II: Live was released in 1992, Racer X was not actually reunited. That year, Paul Gilbert was touring with Mr. Big, and Alderete was recording with a hard rock band called the Scream. In actuality, the album was just a compilation of songs that were recorded in concerts before the hiatus. However, around 1999, Alderete got a telephone call from Paul Gilbert, who asked if there was any possibility of recording another Racer X album. Juan agreed, and Racer X reunited to record Technical Difficulties, which features new material as well as older songs that were never recorded.

In 2003, while working as a radio producer, Alderete received a call from Omar Rodríguez-López of the Mars Volta while on their European tour with an offer to audition for the band:

Eventually I auditioned, but they gave me no sign of whether I was cutting it or not. But they said I could leave my gear for the next day. On the second day, I didn't think I played that well. We jammed some more on the third day, but I was having trouble with this crazy drum break in "Roulette Dares" from the first record. I just couldn't hear what I was supposed to be doing, so I told Omar, "I don't know why I'm not getting it, but I'll really work on it," and he said, "You'd better get it down, because we have a show on Thursday."

He went on to record Frances the Mute with them in 2004, and played bass on every Mars Volta album up through Noctourniquet, as well as a number of solo albums by Omar Rodríguez-López. Since joining the band, he has played at Madison Square Garden and was featured on the front cover of the March 2005 issue of Bass Player Magazine.

Aside from the Mars Volta, Alderete has been invested in his own musical projects. Big Sir is a group composed of Juan and singer Lisa Papineau that has released four albums. Vato Negro is a group with a revolving door of musicians; originally a duo of Alderete and drummer Matt Sherrod, it has since featured Deantoni Parks, Omar Rodriguez-López, and Jon Theodore in various lineups. Alderete has played shows with both groups in 2010, in California and Fuji Rock Festival in Japan.

In addition, Alderete co-produced the film The Sentimental Engine Slayer with Rodríguez-López and former Mars Volta bandmate Paul Hinojos.

After the Mars Volta broke up in 2013, Alderete joined vocalist Cedric-Bixler Zavala in his new band, Zavalaz. He later became the touring bassist for Deltron 3030 and Juliette Lewis and the Licks. Juan also runs a website dedicated to showcasing effects pedals and other musical gear called PedalsAndEffects.com.

Alderete also laid down the bass line for the late rapper and singer Lil Peep on his 2017 single "Benz Truck (гелик)".

On November 5, 2017. Alderete filled in bass for Marilyn Manson at the Ozzfest Meets Knotfest festival, replacing longtime bassist Jeordie White, a.k.a. Twiggy Ramirez. He was Manson's live bass player from then until 2020 following his bicycle accident. He recorded bass tracks on the 2020 album We Are Chaos.

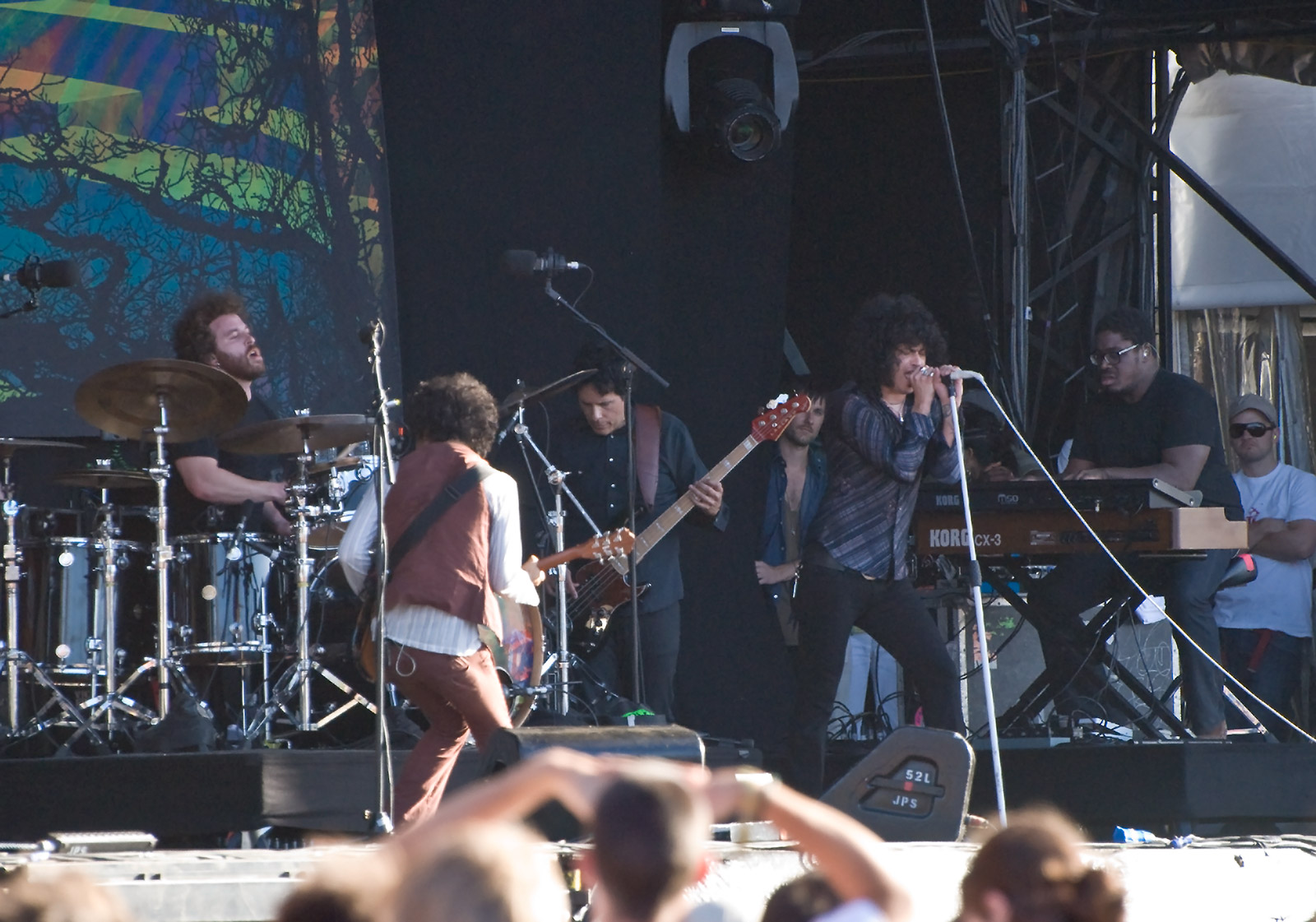
Alderete, middle, at Big Day Out in 2010 with the Mars Volta

== Personal life ==
On May 1, 2007, Alderete announced that he had been diagnosed with polycythemia vera, a rare blood disease. However he also mentioned that he was feeling fine, would experience no side effects from the medication, and would continue to play music. Since discovering his condition, Alderete had agreed to become a spokesman for the MPD Foundation.

On January 13, 2020, Alderete sustained a serious brain injury as a result of a bicycle accident near his home. Despite wearing protective equipment, he suffered a form of diffuse axonal injury and was in a coma for almost four weeks. By September, he had undergone therapies and returned to playing bass.

In April 2023, Anne Kleinedler filed for divorce from Juan Alderete. The divorce became final in July 2025..

In July of 2025, Alderete partnered with Reverb.com to sell over 700 pieces of gear and basses that he used throughout his career. He said on the matter, “All this gear should be in the hands of creative musicians who want to do what [the gear] is designed to do: make beautiful music.”

== Technique and equipment ==
=== Playing style ===
Influenced by players like Jaco Pastorius, Alderete's main playing technique is to use the "standard" fingers to pluck the strings with his right hand (two fingers: index and middle). He occasionally uses Dunlop Gel picks, as well as his signature picks. He is also known to use two-handed tapping techniques and slapping/popping, which was influenced by Louis Johnson, the bass player for the American funk and R&B band the Brothers Johnson. Alderete also cites Dr. Dre and Kool Keith of the hip hop group Ultramagnetic MCs as influences. While the two didn't formally play bass, Alderete looks to their bass lines for influence.

=== Bass guitars ===
- 1971 Fretless Fender Precision Bass (his main bass guitar on Frances the Mute)
- 1973 Fender Precision Bass
- 1977 Fender Jazz Bass
- 1986 Fender Jazz Bass
- 1964 Fender Jazz Bass (recently with flatwound strings)
- Fender Geddy Lee Jazz bass guitars

The Laklands that Alderete had on tour are:

- a white Darryl Jones Signature
- a black custom fretless
- a red Bob Glaub signature

Lakland had made Alderete a bass guitar that if popular, would become a signature model, assumed to be based on his modified 70's fretless Fender Jazz that he used during the Frances the Mute tour.

- Darryl Jones model body
- Fretless neck with painted lines
- Volume/Volume/Tone. (Passive)
- Precision/Jazz pickup orientation
- "Curb" style thumb rest
- Killswitch

For live shows he was most recently using a white model with a white pickguard and maple fingerboard.

=== Amplifiers ===
- Mid-'70s Ampeg SVT Amplifier (now Ampeg SVT-VR heads with 8x10" SVT cabs)
- Early '70s Acoustic 360 preamp and folded 18" cabinet (the "Jaco rig")

Alderete was featured on the first issue of the online magazine Resonate, talking about his Ampeg Rig.

=== Effects Pedals ===
A short, and incomplete, list:

- At least 3 Boss CS-2 Compressor/Sustainers
- MXR DC Brick
- Electro-Harmonix Bass Synthesizer ('70s version)
- Two DigiTech Whammy IV Pedals
- moogerfooger MF-102 Ring Modulator
- DigiTech Digital Delay
- Boss LS-2 Line Selector
- Fulltone Fuzz
- Musitronics Mutron III
- Musitronics Mutron Micro V
- Electro-Harmonix Sovtek Fuzz (second issue)
- MXR Phase 100
- Digitech Bass Synth Wah
- Boss PN-2 Pan Tremolo
- Boss TU-2 Chromatic Tuner
- Dunlop Bass Crybaby Wah
- Boss OC-2 Octave
- Boss DD-3 Digital Delay
- Wren and Cuff Phat Phuk B
- Wren and Cuff Tri Pie 70
- Line 6 DL4 Delay
- Ernie Ball Volume Pedal
- DOD Meat Box Sub Octave Pedal
- EarthQuaker Devices Hummingbird
- EarthQuaker Devices Afterneath

== Discography ==
=== With Racer X ===
- Street Lethal (1986)
- Second Heat (1987)
- Extreme Volume Live (1988)
- Extreme Volume II Live (1992)
- Technical Difficulties (2000)
- Superheroes (2000)
- Snowball of Doom (2002)
- Getting Heavier (2002)
- Snowball of Doom 2 (2002)

=== With the Scream ===
- Let It Scream (1991)
- Takin' It to the Next Level (Recorded in 1993, unreleased)

=== With DC-10 ===
- Co-Burn (1995)

=== With Distortion Felix ===
- Record (1999)
- I'm An Athlete (1999)

=== With Big Sir ===
- Big Sir (2000)
- Now That's What I Call Big Sir (2001)
- Und Die Scheiße Ändert Sich Immer (2006)
- Before Gardens After Gardens (2012)
- Digital Gardens (2014)

=== With Halo Orbit ===
- Halo Orbit (2016/2017)

=== With the Mars Volta ===
- Live (2003)
- Frances the Mute (2005)
- Scabdates (2005)
- Amputechture (2006)
- The Bedlam in Goliath (2008)
- Octahedron (2009)
- Noctourniquet (2012)
- La Realidad De Los Sueños (2021)

=== With Omar Rodríguez-López ===
- Omar Rodriguez (2005)
- Please Heat This Eventually (2006)
- Se Dice Bisonte, No Búfalo (2007)
- Omar Rodriguez-Lopez & Lydia Lunch (2007)
- The Apocalypse Inside of An Orange (2007)
- Calibration (2007)
- Old Money (2008)
- Cryptomnesia (2009)
- Los Sueños de un Higado (2009)
- Xenophanes (2009)
- Sepulcros de Miel (2010)
- Cizaña de los Amores (2010)
- Mantra Hiroshima (2010)
- Dōitashimashite (2010)
- Telesterion (2011)
- Equinox (2013)
- Unicorn Skeleton Mask (2013)
- Arañas en la Sombra (2016)
- Cell Phone Bikini (2016)
- Some Need It Lonely (2016)
- Gorilla Preacher Cartel (2017)
- Solid State Mercenaries (2017)

=== With RJs Prospectors ===
- TBA (2009)

=== With Free Moral Agents ===
- Free Moral Agents (2008)
- Control This (2010)

=== With Vato Negro ===
- Bumpers (2008)
- TBA – (TBA)

=== With Zavalaz ===
- All Those Nights We Never Met (unreleased)

=== With Jonwayne ===
- Jonwayne Is Retired (2015)
- Rap Album 2 (2017)

=== With Del the Funky Homosapien & thegoodnews. ===
- thegoodnews. (2016)
- This Just In! (2025)

=== With Lil Peep ===
- Come Over When You're Sober, Pt. 1 (2017)

=== With Danny Watts ===
- Black Boy Meets World (2017)

=== With Dr. Octagon ===
- Moosebumps: An Exploration Into Modern Day Horripilation (2018)
- Moosebumps: An Exploration Into Modern Day Horripilation the SP 1200 Remixes (2018)

=== With Marilyn Manson ===
- We Are Chaos (2020)

=== Guest appearances ===
- MacAlpine – Eyes of the World (1990)
- The Last Time I Committed Suicide (OST) (1997)
- Paul Gilbert – King of Clubs (1997)
- Thunderbolt: A Tribute to AC/DC (1998)
- Sebastian Bach – Bach 2: Basics (2001)
- Stevie Salas – Shapeshifter - The Fall and Rise of Stevie No Wonder (2002)
- Spin the Bottle: An All-Star Tribute to KISS (2004)
- Lisa Papineau – Night Moves (writer) (2005)
- Captain Black Heart – Captain Black Heart (2006)
- John Cale – Circus Live (2007)
- B'z – Action (2007)
- Stevie Salas – Be What It Is (2008)
- B'z – Ichibu to Zenbu/Dive (2009)
- Various artists – New World Man: A Tribute to Rush (2010)
- Oso – "Delorean" (2010)
- Biceratops – Biceratops (2013)
- G. Love – Bloodshot & Blue (2013)
- Domo Genesis – Genesis (writer) (2016)
- B'z – 声明 / Still Alive (2017)
- Deadpool 2 (OST) (2018)
- Mac Miller – Buttons (single) (2018)
- Tauk – Shapeshifter II : Outbreak (2018)
- Lisa Papineau – Oh Dead On Oh Love (2019)
- An All-Star Tribute To Rush (2022)
- VonLust – VonLust (2022)
- Bright Eyes – Lifted or the Story Is in the Soil, Keep Your Ear to the Ground (A Companion) (2022)
