= Harry Gschoesser =

Austrian entrepreneur and musician (born 1961)

- Born: July 25, 1961 (age 63)
- Genres: Rock, hard rock, heavy metal, fusion
- Occupation(s): Musician, entrepreneur
- Instrument: Drums

Harald "Harry" Gschoesser (born July 25, 1961) is an Austrian entrepreneur and musician. He is the founder of the social network for musicians, Speedgig. He is also a former band drummer of Racer X, which is an American heavy metal band based out of Los Angeles, and former drummer of Austrian rock bands No Bros and Speedy Weekend Band.

== Early life ==
Gschoesser was born in Tirol, Austria. He started playing the drums at the late age of 17. He first attracted the attention of the Austrian band, Scream, with Andy Woerz, who later became an Austrian actor and singer. In 1981, Gschoesser started drumming for the Speedy Weekend Band, which became the most popular heavy metal band in Austria at that time. Playing all over Austria, they also opened for Eric Burdon, Roger Chapman, and others during their Austrian tour.

== History with No Bros ==
After the Speedy Weekend Band broke up, Gschoesser was picked up by No Bros in 1983, an Austrian rock band. Managed by Gotthard Rieger, the band started recording later that year and released the album Our Own Way. In subsequent years, No Bros went on European tours with other bands such as Saxon, Samson, Girlschool, and Ginger Baker and Band, who was the former drummer of Cream.

== Racer X ==
In 1985, Gschoesser moved to Los Angeles and enrolled at the Musicians Institute, where he met fellow students and future Racer X bandmates Paul Gilbert and Juan Alderete. Later that year, Paul Gilbert, who later helped form the popular band Mr. Big, asked Gschoesser to be his drummer for Racer X. Soon after, Juan Alderete, came on as the bass player and later Jeff Martin as their singer. Gilbert entered in a Guitar competition, Guitar Wars, with Gschoesser and Alderete at Gazzarries on the Sunset Strip. Racer X won the competition.

The band started their recording process at Sun Parrier studio near San Francisco in 1985. Since Gschoesser was only on a student visa, he was not allowed to record. The band received legal permission for Gschoesser to work for 24 hours. This allowed Gschoesser to record his drum sequence, while the rest of the band finished up the record in two weeks. After, Racer X released its debut album Street Lethal on January 1, 1986, on Mike Varney's Shrapnel Records label.

Gschoesser left the band. Guitarist Bart Walsh, former member of David Lee Roth Band, connected Gschoesser with the American band Icebreaker. Gschoesser replaced the drummer, Eric Singer. The band performed at Los Angeles nightclubs The Roxy and Whisky a Go Go.

After three years in Los Angeles, Gschoesser returned to Austria when his visa expired.

== Speedgig ==
Back in Austria in 2011, Gschoesser started Speedgig, a social network that allows musicians from all over the world to connect with each other and gain access to the music industry.

== Personal life ==
Gschoesser resides in Austria with his wife and two children.

== Discography ==
=== Racer X ===
- Street Lethal (1986)

=== No Bros ===
- 1983: Our Own Way (LP/MC)
- 1983: Hey You (Single)
- 1983: Princess of My Town (Single)
- 1983: Friends Will Keep Together (Single)
- 1986: Cavalry of Evil (LP/MC)
- 1986: Lady of the Tower (Promo Single)
- 1986: So Hard To See (Single)
- 1993: Nothing But Crumbs (CD)
- 1996: Rough and Rare (CD)
- 2001: The Greatest & The Rarest (CD)
