= Extreme Volume Live =

Live album by Racer X
- Released: 1988
- Recorded: by the Record Plant Mobile
- Venue: Reseda Country Club, (Reseda, California)
- Studio: TMF Recording, (Toluca Lake, California)
- Genre: Heavy metal; speed metal
- Length: 40:38
- Label: Shrapnel (US) Roadrunner (Europe)
- Producer: Ron Bloom, Ricky Delena, Steve Fontano, Racer X, Mike Varney

Racer X chronology
Second Heat (1987)	Extreme Volume Live (1988)	Extreme Volume II Live (1992)

Professional ratings
Review scores
Source	Rating
AllMusic	4/5 stars
Collector's Guide to Heavy Metal	6/10
Rock Hard	8.0/10

Extreme Volume Live is the first live album by the American heavy metal band Racer X. It features solos from four members of the band. It was recorded at The Country Club in Reseda, California.

== Track listing ==
Side one
No.	Title	Writer(s)	Length
1.	"Loud and Clear"	Paul Gilbert, Jeff Martin	3:56
2.	"Dangerous Love"	Gilbert, Martin	3:22
3.	"Bruce's Solo"	Bruce Bouillet	2:42
4.	"Gone Too Far"	Martin, Gilbert	2:57
5.	"John's Solo"	John Alderete	2:16
6.	"She Wants Control"	Gilbert, Martin, Scott Travis	3:39

Side two
No.	Title	Writer(s)	Length
7.	"Scit Scat Wah"	Gilbert, Bouillet, Alderete, Travis	3:58
8.	"Into the Night"	Gilbert, Martin	3:42
9.	"Paul's Solo"	Gilbert	3:36
10.	"Motor Man"	Martin, Gilbert, Bouillet	4:10
11.	"Scott's Solo"	Travis	2:26
12.	"Set the World on Fire"	Gilbert, Bouillet, Alderete, Martin	3:31

== Personnel ==
Racer X

- Jeff Martin – vocals
- Paul Gilbert – lead guitar and rhythm guitar
- Bruce Bouillet – lead guitar and rhythm guitar
- John Alderete – bass guitar
- Scott Travis – drums

Production

- Ron Bloom, Ricky Delena –producers, engineers
- Judd Levison – production management, assistant engineer (TMF Communications, Toluca Lake, CA)
- Steve Fontano – additional production with Racer X, mixing at Prairie Sun Recording Studios in Cotati, California
- George Horn – mastering at Fantasy Studios, Berkeley, California
- Mike Varney – executive producer
