= Roger Wilson (actor) =

American actor (born 1956)

- Born: October 8, 1956 (age 68); New Orleans, Louisiana, U.S.
- Occupations: Real estate developer; singer; former actor
- Spouse: Shaun Casey (1978–1983)

Roger W. Wilson (born October 8, 1956) is an American actor, known for the Porky's movies, Thunder Alley, and the TV series Seven Brides for Seven Brothers.

== Early life and education ==
Wilson was born to Roger William Wilson (d. 1972), President— formerly an executive— of offshore engineering and construction company McDermott, and Arline (née Robinson). He had a brother and sister. Both of his parents died young, and Wilson inherited several million dollars. He attended Woodberry Forest School and graduated in 1975 with Marvin Bush, brother of former President George W. Bush. He later studied at New York University.

== Career ==
Wilson appeared in the first two Porky's movies as well as Thunder Alley and the TV series Seven Brides for Seven Brothers.

Wilson wrote screenplays for producers including Steve Tisch, Penny Marshall, and Sharon Stone. and briefly taught screenwriting classes in New York City in the mid-2000s.

Wilson was the lead singer in the New York-based band Num in the 1990s.

Wilson was also a member of the New York-based band Born Again Baldwins from mid-2008 until the end of 2009.

== Personal life ==
Wilson was married to Estée Lauder model Shaun Casey from 1978 to 1983.

After his divorce, he became supermodel Christy Turlington's first serious boyfriend at age 18. They dated from 1987 to 1993. Turlington told both Cosmopolitan magazine and Dennis Miller, when he had a late-night talk show, that she and Wilson were married. However, it was a spiritual, and not a legal ceremony. Wilson introduced Turlington to yoga and she moved to California briefly to live with him. Turlington had his initials and a rose tattooed on her ankle, which she later removed. Turlington and Wilson broke up in 1993.

Wilson later dated Elizabeth Berkley, best known from TV show Saved by the Bell, in the late 1990s. In 2000, Wilson filed a $40 million lawsuit against fellow actor Leonardo DiCaprio, claiming that DiCaprio encouraged his friends to physically assault Wilson after an argument relating to Berkley. Wilson claimed his larynx was badly damaged. DiCaprio was alleged to have pursued Berkley whilst she was in a relationship with Wilson and Wilson confronted DiCaprio over the accusation.

Wilson also had relationships with Kelly LeBrock, Diane Lane, and Nicollette Sheridan.

Having worked as a wellness coach and having been the lead guitarist and singer for the band Num, Wilson founded the club 7908 in Aspen in 2018. It closed in April 2022.
