= Walt Woodward III =

American drummer (1959–2010)

- Born: February 10, 1959; Paterson, New Jersey, U.S.
- Died: June 8, 2010 (aged 51) Woodland Park, New Jersey, U.S.
- Occupation: Musician
- Instrument: Drums
- Formerly of: The Scream; Twisted Sister; Shark Island; Sweet Savage; The Painkillers; Rachel; Americade

Walt Woodward III (February 10, 1959 – June 8, 2010) was an American rock drummer who played in several bands, including Shark Island and Saints or Sinners and the Scream.

He replaced original Saints or Sinners and the Scream drummer Scott Travis, who left the band to replace drummer Dave Holland in Judas Priest, in 1989.

Walt started his career in the New York and New Jersey area, playing in Rachel, featuring Riot vocalist Rhett Forrester, and Americade, as well as several other bands. His move to California enabled him to be a part of Sweet Savage, Shark Island and the Scream. Walt also did a worldwide tour with surf guitar legend Dick Dale.

He was also in a three-day line-up with the heavy metal band, Twisted Sister in March 1982.

Walt returned to New Jersey and played in various local bands, including the Painkillers.

Walt died on June 8, 2010 at the age of 51 from liver failure caused by alcohol poisoning.

== Discography ==
=== with the Scream ===
- Let It Scream (1991)
- Encino Man OST (1992)
- Takin' It To The Next Level (1993; unreleased)

=== with Shark Island ===
- S'cool Buss (1987)

=== with Americade ===
- American Metal (1982)
- Americade.com (1995)
- Americadence 1980 ~ 1995 (2011, 5-CD boxed set)
