= Getting Heavier =

Studio album by Racer X
- Released: December 18, 2002
- Genre: Heavy metal
- Length: 56:21
- Label: Universal Japan
- Producer: Paul Gilbert

Racer X chronology
Snowball of Doom (2002)	Getting Heavier (2002)	Snowball of Doom 2 (2002)

Professional ratings
Review scores
Source	Rating
Allmusic	(link)

Getting Heavier is Racer X's fifth and final studio album, and their final album before their hiatus.

== Track listing ==
No.	Title	Writer(s)	Length
1.	"Dr. X"	Racer X	5:31
2.	"Lucifer's Hammer"	Jeff Martin	3:43
3.	"Golden God"	Racer X	4:23
4.	"Bucket of Rocks"	Jeff Martin	4:27
5.	"Go-GG-Go"	Racer X	4:19
6.	"Heaven in '74"	Racer X	3:26
7.	"Everything's Everything"	Jeff Martin	3:46
8.	"Empty Man"	Racer X	4:57
9.	"The Siren's Eye"	Racer X	6:23
10.	"Ghost Dance"	Racer X	5:03
11.	"Endless"	Racer X	5:24
12.	"Catapult to Extinction"	Racer X	4:58
Total length:			56:21

== Personnel ==
- Jeff Martin – vocals, additional percussion and keyboards
- Paul Gilbert – guitars
- John Alderete – bass
- Scott Travis – drums

== Charts ==
Chart (2002)	Peak position
Japanese Albums (Oricon)	22
