= Leatherwolf =

American heavy metal band

- Origin: Huntington Beach, California, U.S.
- Genres: Heavy metal; power metal; glam metal; hard rock
- Years active: 1981–1992; 1999–present
- Labels: NIL8; Rock of Angels; Rubicon; Hellion; Massacre; King; Dynamo; Grand Slamm; Island; Heavy Metal America; Tropical/Enigma
- Members: Keith Adamiak; Rob Math; Luke Man; Barry Sparks; Wayne Findlay; Dean Roberts
- Past members: Michael Olivieri; Carey Howe; Paul Carman; Patrick Guyton; Geoff Gayer; Joey Tafolla; Greg Erba; Wade Black; Eric Halpern; Pete Perez; Jeff Martin; Marco Forcone; Matt Hurich; Punky Peru; Scott Moore; Carl Detkin; Jerome Sevron
- Website: leatherwolfmetal.com

Leatherwolf is an American heavy metal band formed in Huntington Beach, California in 1981. They split up in 1992, but reunited in 1999. The group is also nicknamed the "Triple Axe Attack" for pioneering the use of a 3-guitar lineup in heavy metal.

Currently comprising lead vocalist Keith Adamiak, guitarists Rob Math and Luke Man, bassist Barry Sparks, and drummer Dean Roberts, the band has released six studio albums. Leatherwolf has undergone many lineup changes during its existence. No member has been constant throughout its entire timeline but several former members have returned at differing times. The band continues to perform live and released a new album in 2022 titled Kill the Hunted.

== History ==
=== Early days and first two albums (1981–1988) ===
Formed in the early 1980s, a teenaged Leatherwolf emerged on the Southern California scene sharing bills with fellow L.A and O.C. metal acts such as Metallica, Witch, and Slayer at venues like the Woodstock and Radio City.

Witch drummer Punky Peru (Perry Boyer) was part of the first Leatherwolf line-up in 1981 along with bassist Jerome Sevron (Jammin' Gyro), Scott Moore and Geoff Gayer on guitars and vocalist Carl Detkin. This line-up was very short-lived and already the same year Matt Hurich joined on bass, Dean Roberts on drums, and Carey Howe on guitar. By their 1983 demo, also vocalist Detkin was replaced by Michael Olivieri leaving Gayer as the only original member when the band was signed.

Leatherwolf quickly caught the attention of Enigma Records affiliated indie label, Tropical Records, who financed the band's eponymous 1984 five-song EP, produced by Randy Burns. Germany's Steamhammer/SPV label released the EP, upgraded to a full-fledged album, in 1985, titled Leatherwolf, while Heavy Metal America, who had the rights for Great Britain, issued it as Endangered Species, so named after one of the songs on the album.

In 1986, Matt Hurich left to join the band Stryper and was replaced by Paul Carman, formerly of Black Sheep. The band signed a new major label record deal with Island Records, and released the confusingly titled, Kevin Beamish produced Leatherwolf in 1987. A video for the first single, "The Calling," was shown on MTV. It was followed up with another single, "Cry Out", featuring a cover of Creedence Clearwater Revival's "Bad Moon Rising" on the B-side.

=== Street Ready and split (1989–1992) ===
For 1989's Street Ready album, recorded in the Bahamas, the band kept on Beamish as producer, but asked the German expatriate Michael Wagener for the mix. Although the first single/video was the radio-friendly semi-power ballad "Hideaway", Street Ready saw the band take a step back toward their more metallic roots with songs such as opener "Wicked Ways", "Too Much", and especially the all-instrumental tour-de-force, "Black Knight". Leatherwolf finally made their European live debut in the spring of 1989 with an appearance at the Aardschokdag in the Netherlands and opening slots for Japan's Vow Wow and German metallers Zed Yago. The overall lack of label support began to take its toll on the band's inner workings and drummer Dean Roberts was eventually ousted in favor of Marco Forcone (ex-Enticier). Roberts joined The Rod Squad, led by vocalist Dennis "The Rod" Carlock (who was earlier in Knightmare II with Warrant guitarist Joey Allen), with whom he recorded the "Body Heater" 7" in 1990.

Even bigger changes lay ahead as Leatherwolf dropped their trademark style in favor of a grungier hybrid approach and euro-style visuals. With Patrick Guyton (ex-Enticier, Aaronsrod) replacing Paul Carman on bass, the band had morphed into Hail Mary by 1992. However, success under the new moniker proved as elusive as ever as grunge rock was quickly becoming the new flavor of the month, causing Leatherwolf/Hail Mary and many of their contemporaries to lose popularity. Due to these circumstances, midway through recording their first album release as Hail Mary, the band called it quits in late 1993. Leatherwolf was one of those few bands that historically many feel never got enough credit, and has been ranked as one of the most underrated heavy rock bands of the 1980s by fans. Grand Slamm Records re-issued the self-titled Leatherwolf debut on CD in 1991.

=== Reunion and World Asylum (1999–2006) ===
It was not until 1999 when the classic Leatherwolf lineup re-emerged with a celebrated reunion show at the Galaxy Theater in Santa Ana, CA, documented on the Wide Open live album that featured 14 of the band's best songs as well as a cover of the Doors' "Break On Through". Leatherwolf also made their return to Europe with an exclusive show at the Wacken Open Air festival in Germany that same year. Further activities remained few and far between, and Michael Olivieri announced his departure in the spring of 2003 after supporting Halford at the Grove in Anaheim, CA. Auditioning various singers, the band recorded a 3-song demo consisting of "Disconnect", "Behind the Gun", and "Burned" (later renamed "The Grail") with Jeff Martin from Racer X. Martin eventually declined to join on a full-time basis and lone survivors, Geoff Gayer and Dean Roberts, started the search anew and were finally introduced to Florida-based screamer Wade Black (Crimson Glory, Leash Law, Seven Witches). With both Carey Howe and Paul Carman out of the picture, bass was handled by San Antonio, TX native Pete Perez (Riot, Spastic Ink) while OC local Mark Smith and Houstonian Eric Halpern (Destiny's End, Z-Lot-Z) contributed additional lead guitars to the new album. Co-produced by Roberts and Gayer and mixed by Jacob Hansen at Hansen Studios in Ribe, Denmark, World Asylum was released in the spring of 2006 to great reviews and Leatherwolf played the Bang Your Head!!! festival in Germany in June, with Paul Carman back in the fold on bass for the occasion. The band also shot a promotional video for the song "Behind The Gun" with director Karpis Maksudian. Former bassist Patrick Guyton took over on bass for the band's ProgPower USA festival appearance in Atlanta, Georgia, in late 2006.

=== Reunion with Michael Olivieri, New World Asylum and Unchained Live ===
Original members Carey Howe and Michael Olivieri returned in 2007 and Leatherwolf re-issued World Asylum with Olivieri's vocals in place of Wade Black as New World Asylum, again mixed by Hansen. In the fall of 2007, Leatherwolf embarked on a short European tour, highlighted by a headline appearance at the 9th edition of Germany's Keep It True festival. The only remaining original member, guitarist Geoff Gayer was let go at the end of the trip and replaced by Greg Erba with whom the band lensed a video clip for "Dr. Wicked (Rx O.D.)", with Karpis Maksudian at the helm once again. It would be included on the Monsters of Metal Vol. 6 video compilation by Nuclear Blast.

By mid-2009, Leatherwolf were said to be writing for a new studio album and shared a bill with Anthrax, Saxon, Overkill, Anvil, and Metal Church at the third annual Rocklahoma festival on July 9, 2009. Michael Olivieri's solo album, Goodbye Rain, was released in December 2009.

In early December 2013, the band announced the release of their Unchained Live album, the first to feature the new guitar duo of Rob Math and Greg Erba.

In late May 2015, former members Carey Howe, Geoff Gayer and Wade Black announced that they were working on a new Leatherwolf studio album for a late fall release. Drummer Dean Roberts and vocalist/guitarist Michael Olivieri, original members of the band's current lineup, countered by issuing a statement laying claim to sole legal ownership of the name Leatherwolf. Howe and Gayer eventually settled on the name Haunt of Jackals and released their debut album, The Chosen, in January 2017 which also included Patrick Guyton handling the bass tracks.

In early January 2017, it was announced that guitarist Joey Tafolla had joined Leatherwolf in place of Greg Erba. The band parted ways with Tafolla six months later due to scheduling conflicts, with 21-year old Luke Man stepping in and taking part in the 2017 UK tour, Leatherwolf's first British live dates in some 28 years.

The band would play their first Southern California show with Man now a full band member on November 18 at the Slidebar in Fullerton, CA sharing a bill with Odin.

=== New lineup and Kill the Hunted (2019–present) ===
On February 11, 2019, Leatherwolf announced on their Facebook page that they had parted ways with lead vocalist and original member Michael Olivieri for reasons unknown. On August 1, 2019, the band officially introduced Keith Adamiak as their new lead vocalist, and announced the return of original guitarist Geoff Gayer and bassist Paul Carman, in place of Luke Man and Patrick Guyton, respectively. A brand new song, "The Henchman", off their forthcoming studio album, tentatively set for a spring 2020 release, was posted on the band's YouTube channel.

On May 8, 2022, a lineup comprising Keith Adamiak, Rob Math, Luke Man, Dean Roberts, former Michael Schenker Group guitarist/keyboardist Wayne Findlay, and fill-in bassist Brice Snyder, a one-time bandmate of Man in Railgun, appeared at the M3 Festival in Columbia, MD, unveiling the band's latest incarnation.

On July 14, 2022, the group released a lyric video for a new song, "Hit the Dirt", and also announced that their new album, Kill the Hunted, would be released later in the year. A second lyric video for "The Henchman", with a lead guitar special guest appearance by Whitesnake's Joel Hoekstra, went online on September 13, 2022, and November album release dates were announced for North and South America, Europe, and Japan. The new album, recorded with the aid of session bassist, Barry Sparks, was supported with a promotional video for the title track, "Kill The Hunted".

On July 18, 2023, the band announced an August 18 release date for the "Kill The Hunted" vinyl edition and premiered a performance video for the vinyl bonus track, "Thunder (MMXXII)", a remake of the 1989 Street Ready album cut, also made available as a digital single. The release was celebrated with an August 23 headline show at the Whisky A Go-Go in Hollywood, CA.

== Band members ==
Leatherwolf at the Rock Hard Festival 2018 in Germany

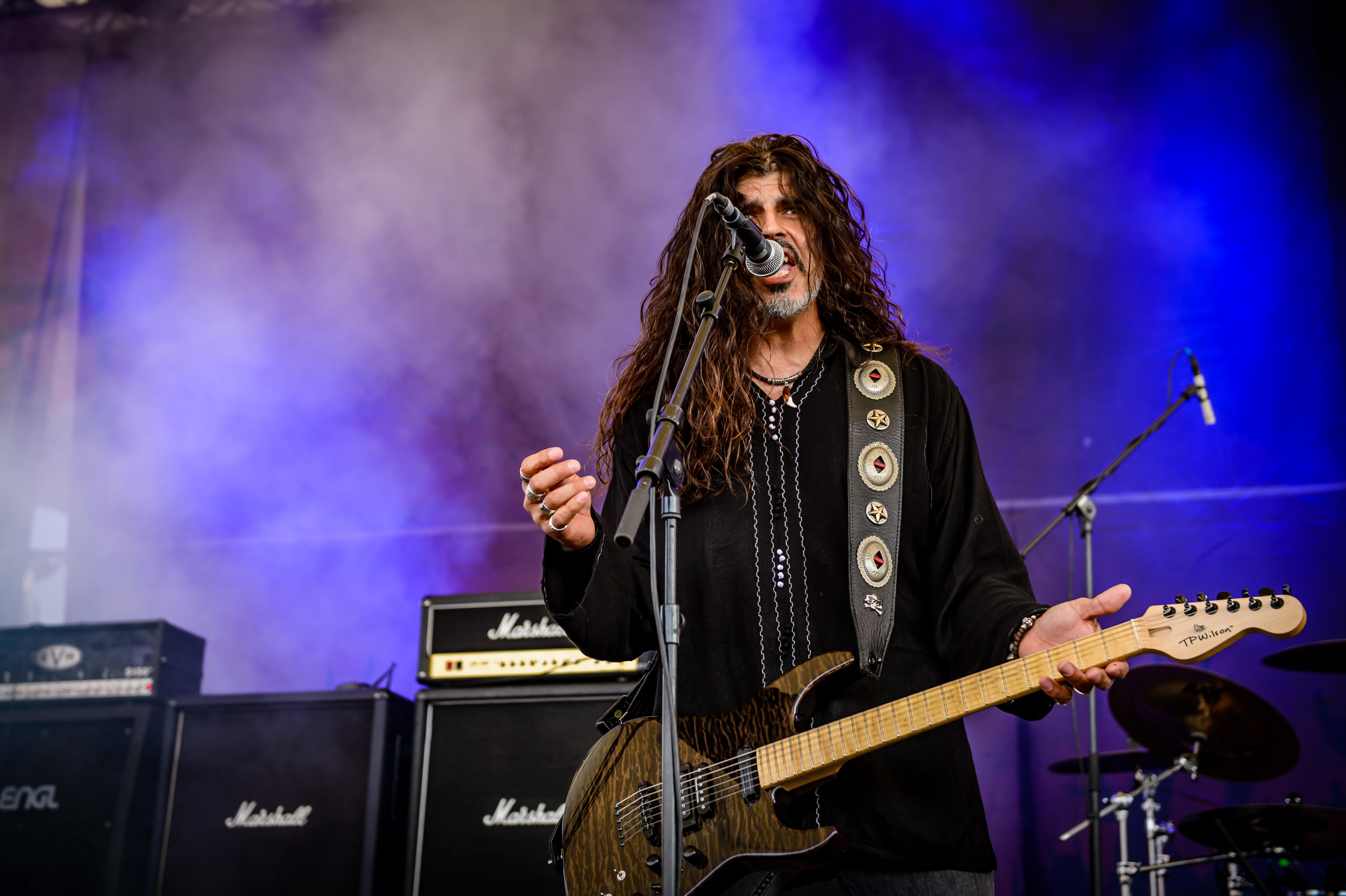

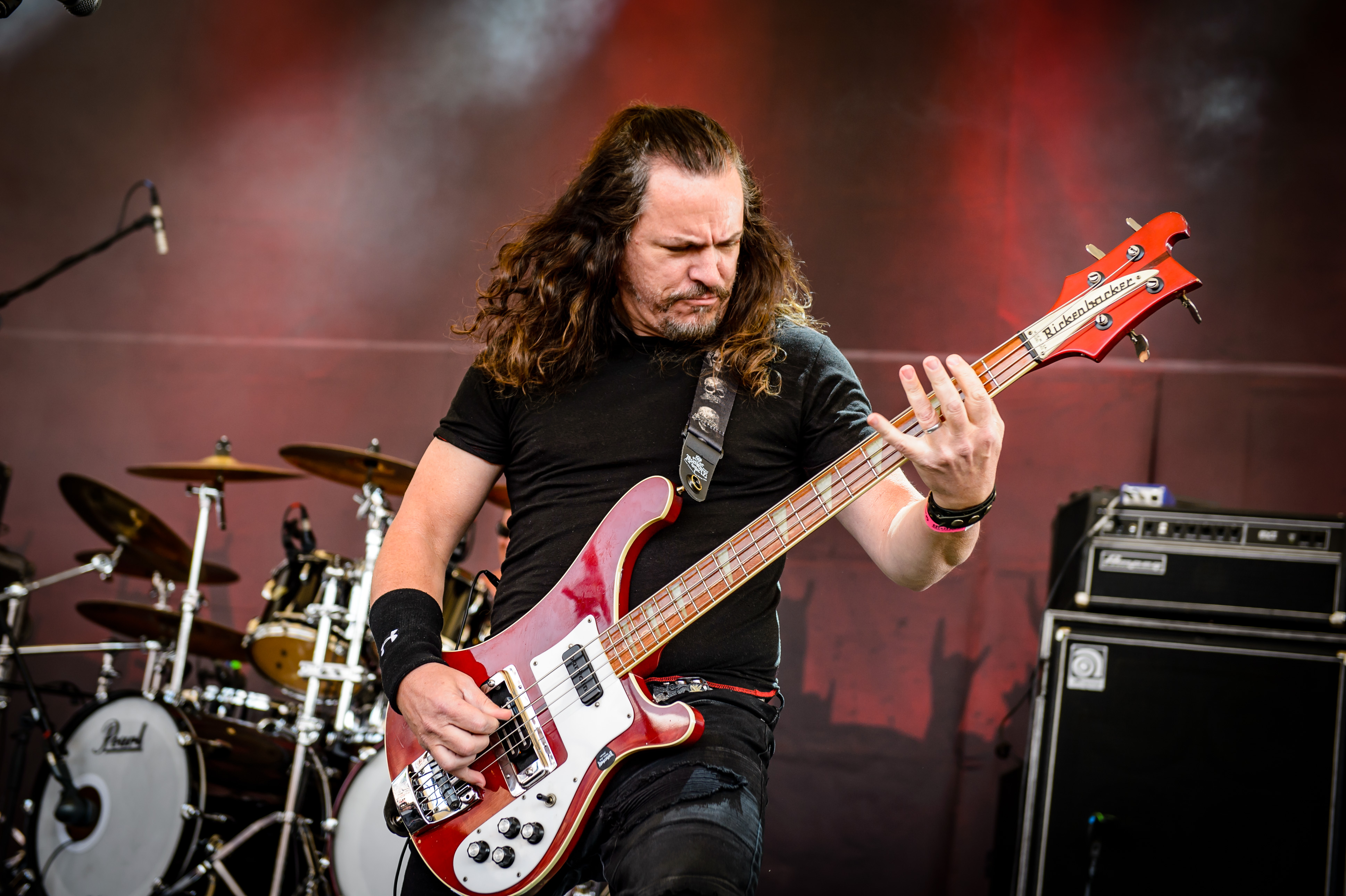

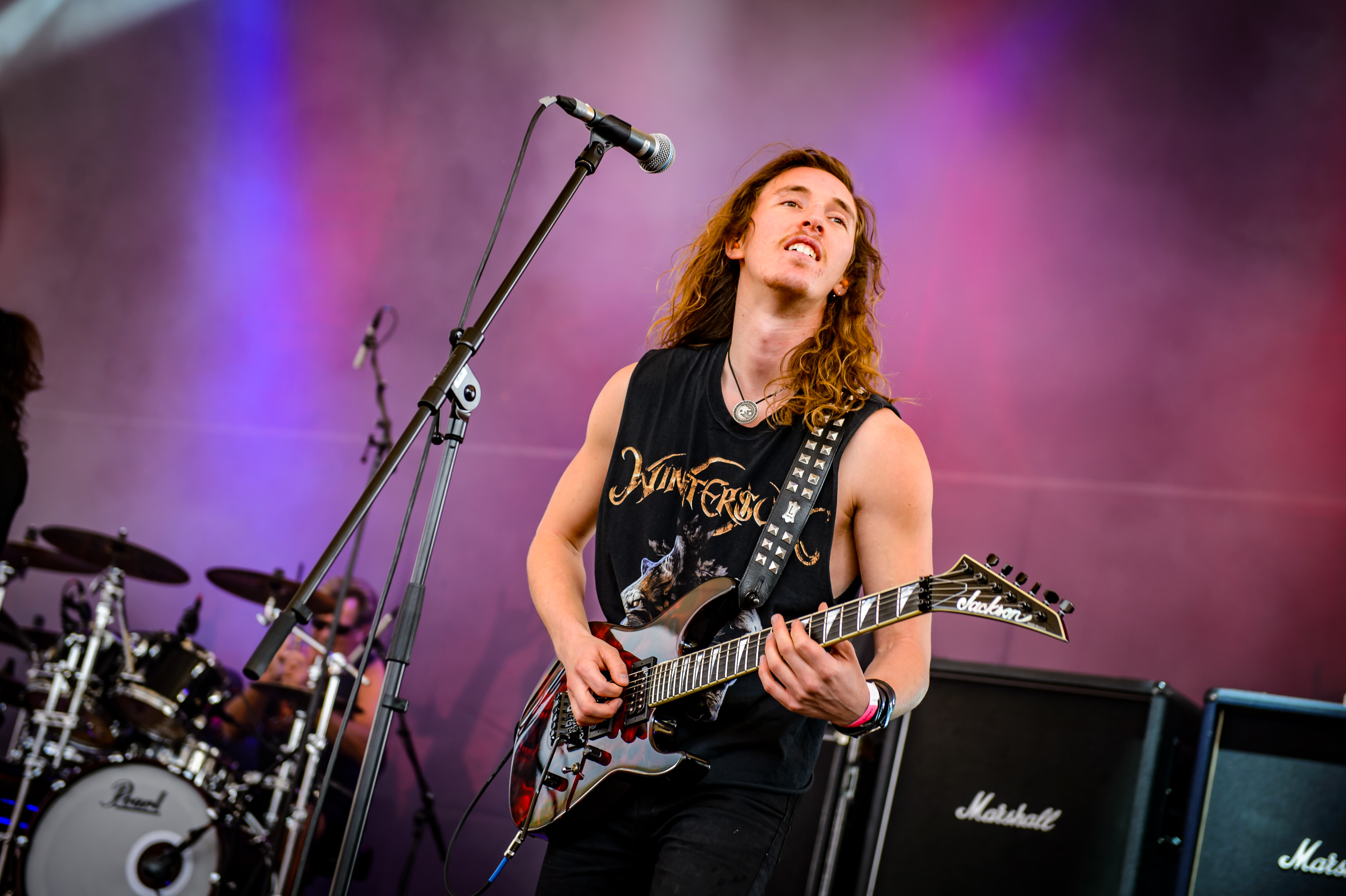

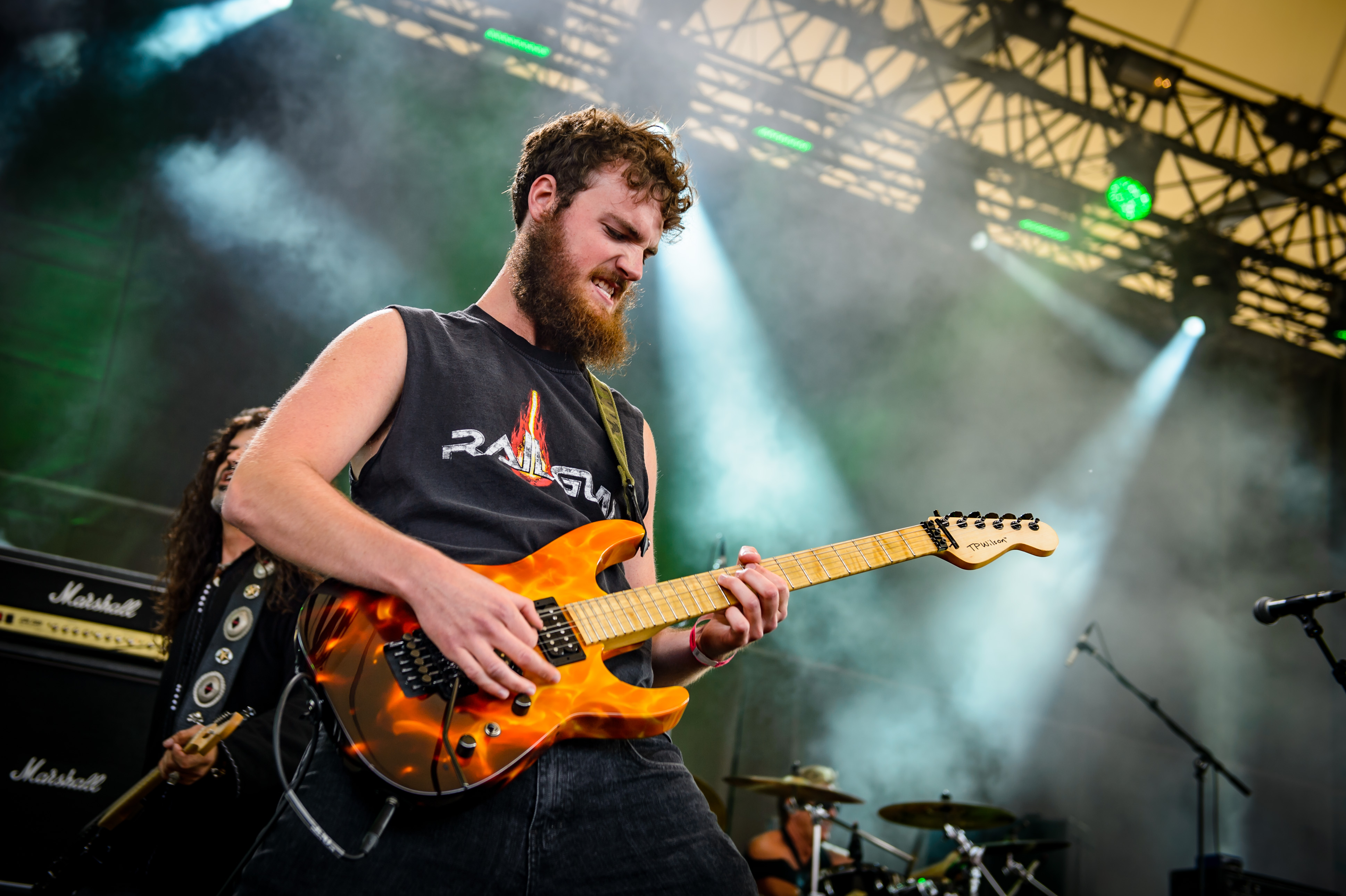

Current members

- Dean "Drum Machine" Roberts – drums (1981–1989, 1999–present)
- Rob Math – guitars (2011–present)
- Luke Man – guitars (2017–2018, 2022–present)
- Keith Adamiak – vocals (2019–present)
- Wayne Findlay – guitars (2022–present)
- Barry Sparks – bass (2022-present)

Former members

- Michael Olivieri – vocals, guitar, keyboards (1981–1992, 1999–2004, 2007–2018)
- Geoff Gayer – guitars (1981–1992, 1999–2007, 2019–2021)
- Paul Carman – bass (1986–1989, 1999–2005, 2010, 2019–2022)
- Carey Howe – guitars (1981–1992, 1999–2004, 2007–2013)
- Matt Hurich – bass (1981–1986)
- Patrick Guyton – bass, backing vocals (1989–1992, 2006–2018)
- Marco Forcone – drums (1989–1992)
- Jeff Martin – vocals (2004–2006)
- Wade Black – vocals (2006–2007)
- Eric Halpern – guitars (2006–2007)
- Pete Perez – bass (2006)
- Greg Erba – guitars (2008–2011, 2013–2016)
- Joey Tafolla – guitars (2017)
- Punky Peru – drums (1981)
- Jerome Sevron – bass (1981)
- Scott Moore – guitar (1981)
- Carl Detkin – vocals (1981–1982)

Timeline

== Discography ==
=== Studio albums ===
- Endangered Species (1985)
- Leatherwolf (1987)
- Street Ready (1989)
- World Asylum (2006)
- New World Asylum (2007)
- Kill the Hunted (2022)

=== Live albums ===
- Wide Open (1999)
- Unchained Live (2013)

=== Extended plays ===
- Leatherwolf (1984)
