= Scott Travis =

American drummer (born 1961)

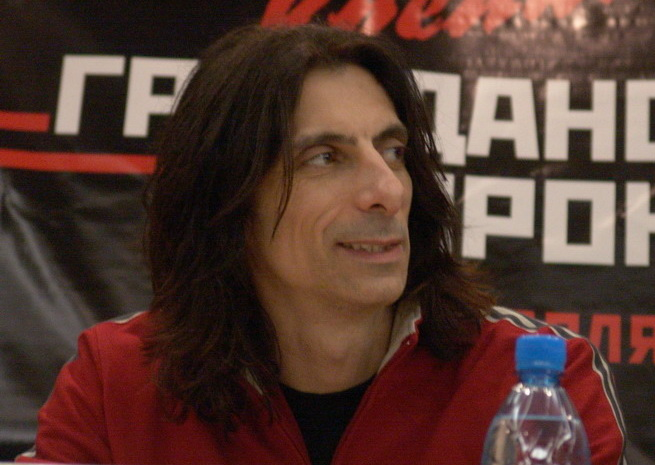
- Travis in 2004

Background information
- Born: Mark Scott Travis; September 6, 1961 (age 64); Norfolk, Virginia, U.S.
- Genres: Heavy metal; speed metal; hard rock
- Occupation: Musician
- Instrument: Drums
- Years active: 1981–present
- Member of: Judas Priest; Thin Lizzy
- Formerly of: Racer X; The Scream; Fight; Animetal USA; Elegant Weapons

Mark Scott Travis (born September 6, 1961) is an American musician, best known as the drummer for the English heavy metal band Judas Priest, the Irish rock band Thin Lizzy, and the supergroup Elegant Weapons. He was also a longtime member of the American heavy metal band Racer X during their initial run and their subsequent reformation until their 2009 breakup.

As a member of Judas Priest, he was inducted into the Rock and Roll Hall of Fame in 2022.

== Biography ==
Born in Norfolk, Virginia, Travis was a well-known drummer in the local music scene of a region known as Hampton Roads during the early 1980s. Playing with bands in clubs throughout Norfolk, Virginia Beach, and Newport News. Travis moved to California in the early to mid-1980s and performed in various local bands, such as Hawk, later moving on to perform for the critically acclaimed band Racer X, and very briefly performed in Saints Or Sinners, which later changed their name to The Scream, and also featured Travis's Racer X bandmates Bruce Bouillet and Juan Alderete. His big career move came about late in the decade after Judas Priest's longtime drummer Dave Holland left the band in 1989, citing personal reasons.

Travis had always wanted to be the drummer of Judas Priest. As a teenager, he had often thought about setting up his drum kit in the parking lot at the Hampton Coliseum in hopes that the band would notice him as they went past with their tour bus. He finally decided to wait at the back of the arena to hand the band a tape of his playing. Holland was still the band's drummer at the time, so nothing ever came out of the encounter. When Holland did leave Judas Priest in 1989, vocalist Jeff Martin heard about it through his friendship with Rob Halford. Martin called up Travis one day and said, "Guess who needs a drummer." Travis auditioned for the vacant position and became their new member, thus becoming the first non-Briton to perform for the band. He has been with the band ever since and also handles drum duties for Racer X as well. Travis also performed drums in Halford's band Fight from 1992 to 1995, but to date, he is best known for his work with Judas Priest, for which he has been widely acclaimed ever since his debut on the 1990 album Painkiller.

Travis was largely responsible for hiring Tim 'Ripper' Owens as Halford's replacement in Judas Priest in 1996. Owens would remain in the band until the 2003 reunion with Halford.

Travis takes credit as the co-writer for the song "Cyberface", which appears on Judas Priest's 2001 album Demolition, making it his first and only contribution in the band.

In April 2016, Travis joined the reformed line-up of Thin Lizzy for reunion shows and has remained in the band as their official member.

He is commonly mistaken to be left-handed. In reality, he is ambidextrous, and plays with an open style. He is 6'6" tall.

== Equipment ==
Travis always used Tama Drums until 2008. On the first leg of the Judas Priest "Nostradamus Tour" he played a Pearl kit and then switched to a DW kit for the second leg. He was also seen using a DW kit at the NAMM Show with his band Racer X. His DW setup is: two 23"x24" bass drums, 14"x6.5" snare,8"x8" 10"x9" 12"x9" and 14"x10" rack toms and 16"x14" and 18"x16" floor toms. Travis has played Paiste cymbals since May 1987. He also plays Evans drum heads and uses Vater drumsticks.

== Discography ==
=== Racer X ===
- Second Heat (1987)
- Extreme Volume Live (1988)
- Extreme Volume II Live (1992)
- Technical Difficulties (1999)
- Superheroes (2000)
- Getting Heavier (2002)

=== Judas Priest ===
- Painkiller (1990)
- Jugulator (1997)
- '98 Live Meltdown (1998)
- Demolition (2001)
- Live in London (2003)
- Angel of Retribution (2005)
- Nostradamus (2008)
- A Touch of Evil: Live (2009)
- Redeemer of Souls (2014)
- Battle Cry (2016)
- Firepower (2018)
- Invincible Shield (2024)

=== Fight ===
- War of Words (1993)
- Mutations (1994)
- A Small Deadly Space (1995)

=== Hawk ===
- Let the Metal Live (2009)
