= Lisa Papineau =

American musician

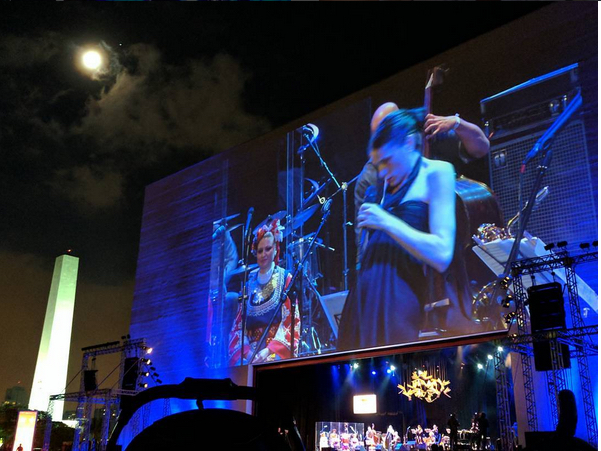
- Papineau performing in Brazil in 2017

Background information
- Born: Providence, Rhode Island, U.S.

Lisa Papineau is an American musician and songwriter. She has released four solo albums, and is the songwriter and vocalist for Los Angeles band Big Sir. Papineau is a frequent collaborator of Japanese composer Jun Miyake and has also written songs for and recorded with other bands and solo artists, including Air, M83, Halo Orbit, ME & LP, Renaud-Gabriel Pion, Jam Da Silva, Dinho Ouro Preto, Anubian Lights, Farflung, P.O.D., Omar Rodríguez-López, Scapegoat Wax, Scenario Rock, Arman Méliès, Mandrake, Sissy Bar, and Crooked Cowboy and the Freshwater Indians.

Papineau received initial recognition when her band Pet, co-founded with composer Tyler Bates, was featured on The Crow: City of Angels soundtrack, and later the Blue Note Records soundtrack for The Last Time I Committed Suicide. Pet's self-titled album was executive-produced by Tori Amos.

Papineau was born in Providence, Rhode Island. She has multiple sclerosis.

== Discography ==
- Night Moves (Productions Spéciales, 2005)
- Red Trees (Yellowbird, 2009)
- Blood Noise (Neurotic Yell Records, 2013)
- Oh Dead On Oh Love (Hornbuckle Records, 2019)
