= The Scream (band) =

American hard rock band

- The Scream, 1991. L-R: Walt Woodward III, John Corabi, Bruce Boulliet, and Juan Alderete.

Background information
- Also known as: Saints or Sinners
- Origin: Los Angeles, California, U.S.
- Genres: Hard rock, sleaze rock, blues rock
- Years active: 1989–1993
- Label: Hollywood Records
- Past members: John Corabi; Billy Fogarty; Bruce Bouillet; Juan Alderete; Scott Travis; Walt Woodward III

The Scream was an American hard rock band based in Los Angeles, originally formed in 1989 as Saints or Sinners.

== History ==
The band originally featured former Angora singer John Corabi and former Racer X members guitarist Bruce Bouillet, bassist Juan Alderete, and drummer Scott Travis. However, Scott Travis quickly left to join Judas Priest, and was replaced by former Shark Island drummer Walt Woodward III. Scott Travis co-wrote "I Don't Care" on Let It Scream, though he did not actually play on the album.

They changed their name from Saints or Sinners to The Scream shortly after Walt Woodward III replaced Scott Travis. Many of the songs on their 1991 debut Let It Scream were performed by the band in concert before the album was ever recorded.

After releasing their 1991 debut Let It Scream on Hollywood Records, which included the singles "Man In The Moon" and "I Believe in Me", and playing an historic, one-off show at the Astoria Theatre in London on December 6th, Corabi left the band to replace the recently departed Vince Neil in Mötley Crüe.

The Scream then recruited former Dashboard Mary singer Billy Fogarty and recorded their second album, Takin' It to the Next Level, but were dropped from the record label before the album could be released. The Scream split up and Fogarty, Bouillet and Alderete went on to form a brief musical project with John Moore and drummer Abe Laboriel Jr. called DC-10, which recorded and released the album Co-Burn.

John Corabi joined Mötley Crüe after Vince Neil's departure and recorded the self-titled 1994 album with the band. However, poor sales and inadequate tour support resulted in Vince Neil's return to the band. Corabi has played in many bands since, including Ratt, Union and E.S.P., a supergroup with Eric Singer, Bruce Kulick, Chuck Garrick and Karl Cochran, who primarily perform covers of songs from its various members’ well-known bands. Since February 2015, Corabi has joined The Dead Daisies with which he has recorded two studio albums (Revolución in 2015 and Make Some Noise in 2016).

Walt Woodward III died on June 8, 2010, of alcohol poisoning.

== Members ==
- John Corabi – lead vocals, acoustic guitar (1989–1992)
- Bruce Bouillet – guitars (1989–1993)
- Juan Alderete (as John Alderete) – bass, backing vocals (1989–1993)
- Scott Travis – drums (1989)
- Walt Woodward III – drums, backing vocals (1990–1993; died 2010)
- Billy Fogarty – lead vocals (1992–1993)

== Discography ==
=== Studio albums ===
- Let It Scream (1991)

=== Unreleased albums ===
- Takin' It to the Next Level (recorded 1993)

=== Soundtrack appearances ===
- In 1992, they released the single "Young and Dumb" for the movie Encino Man (the track is played in "Blades", while 'Link' paints with ketchup and mustard).

== Related links ==
- The Scream at AllMusic
- Out of your speakers and into your living room...it's THE SCREAM! The Racer X tribute to The Scream
- The Scream, on Sleaze Roxx
