= Racer X (band) =

American metal band

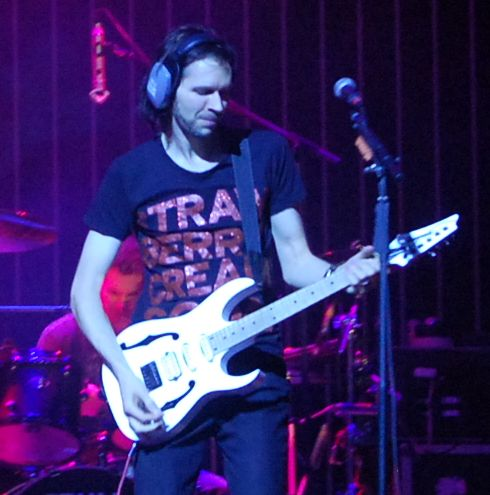
- Band founder Paul Gilbert

Background information
- Origin: Los Angeles, California, U.S.
- Genres: Heavy metal; speed metal; neoclassical metal
- Years active: 1985–1989; 1999–2003 (one-off reunion show in 2009)
- Labels: Shrapnel, Universal Japan
- Spinoffs: Lethal X; Mr. Big; The Scream
- Past members: Harry Gschoesser; Bruce Bouillet; Chris Arvan; Oni Logan; Juan Alderete; Jeff Martin; Scott Travis; Paul Gilbert
- Website: racerxband.com

Racer X was an American heavy metal band formed in Los Angeles in 1985. The group went through a hiatus and a few lineup changes, with bassist Juan Alderete being the sole constant member. They were signed to Shrapnel Records.

== History ==
=== 1980s ===
Guitarist Paul Gilbert first gained recognition when he was featured in Mike Varney's Spotlight Column in the February 1983 issue of Guitar Player magazine. Gilbert was 16 years old and was living in Greensburg, Pennsylvania. He later moved to Los Angeles and enrolled at the Guitar Institute of Technology (GIT), part of the Musicians Institute. After graduating from GIT, Gilbert was hired as an instructor and recorded the album "Trouble in the Streets" with Los Angeles metal band Black Sheep, released on Enigma Records in November 1985. While at GIT, Gilbert met fellow student Juan Alderete. Searching for a drummer, Alderete and Gilbert first turned to Scott Travis, who was living in Virginia at the time, but he turned down the offer due to his commitment to the band Hawk. Travis was receiving a salary from Doug Marks, the band's lead guitarist, and would not turn down the income. Alderete and Gilbert instead sought the services of fellow student Harry Gschoesser. After acquiring Gschoesser, Gilbert, with the help of Varney, recruited Jeff Martin of the Phoenix metal band Surgical Steel. Martin, who still lived in Phoenix and could not regularly write songs with Racer X in Los Angeles, began writing lyrics immediately for demo tapes that Gilbert had sent him. Recording for their first album began quickly. The band began the recording process in 1985, and Racer X's debut album Street Lethal was released on January 1, 1986, on Mike Varney's Shrapnel Records label.

==== Popularity boost ====
With the release of Street Lethal, Paul Gilbert entered the mainstream as one of the members of the Neoclassical genre, popularized by Randy Rhoads and Yngwie J. Malmsteen. While Racer X was not playing neo-classical pieces as frequently as Rhoads or Malmsteen, Gilbert was often mentioned alongside Malmsteen and Rhoads in many guitar and music magazines. Gilbert acknowledged his debt to Malmsteen on the Street Lethal album with the neoclassical instrumental "Y.R.O.". The title is an acronym for "Yngwie Rip Off". He would repeat such a reference on a later song, "B.R.O.", which stands for "Bach Rip Off".

Racer X was rapidly becoming a popular live act on the Sunset Strip. Around this time, Gilbert secured an endorsement deal with Ibanez guitars, which continues to this day. The song "Getaway" received limited airplay on Los Angeles' heavy metal radio station, KNAC.

==== Lineup change ====
After the release of the first album, Gilbert was still teaching at GIT for a steady income. One of Gilbert's students, Bruce Bouillet, gained his attention. Gilbert asked him to join Racer X, and the two guitarists would soon work out synchronized harmony passages that would redefine Racer X's sound. In 1986, Racer X's drummer Harry Gschoesser's visa expired, so he returned to his native country, Austria. He was initially replaced with Todd "Vito" DeVito, who had played on Black Sheep's Trouble In The Streets LP alongside Gilbert, but was soon replaced by Scott Travis. DeVito went on to become a drum technician for Mikkey Dee of Motörhead.

The band headed to Prairie Sun Studios in Cotati to record their second studio album. Second Heat was released in February 1987 by Shrapnel Records, and solidified Racer X's style of double-lead guitar solos using techniques such as fast alternate-picking, two-handed tapping, string skipping, and sweep picking. The album also has two tracks written by other artists. "Moonage Daydream" was a David Bowie cover, and "Heart of a Lion" was a Judas Priest song dropped from the Turbo album. The song was a birthday gift by Rob Halford, who had befriended Jeff Martin in the band's early days. Halford later recorded the track with his band, Halford.

==== Dissolution ====
While the Los Angeles music scene was at the peak for glam metal, Racer X were reaching the height of their popularity with their live shows. The band was selling out and packing their usual rotation of The Roxy Theatre, Troubadour, and the Chuck Landis' Country Club in Reseda, California. The years of unsuccessfully searching for major label representation finally took its toll on the band, and the group's last gasp came with two nights of back-to-back live shows at the Chuck Landis' Country Club, which were recorded and released as Extreme Volume Live (1988) and Extreme Volume II Live (1992). But even as Live Extreme, Vol. 1 was getting ready for release, the dismantling of the band was near. Billy Sheehan, bass player of the band Talas, approached Paul Gilbert about forming a new band; in mid 1989, the two formed the band Mr. Big. Gilbert had mentally detached himself from Racer X during the final shows. The rest of the group, searching for an explanation to the lack of major label interest, focused their frustrations on Jeff Martin. Both Gilbert and Martin left the band on the same day. Juan Alderete, Bruce Bouillet, and Scott Travis initially brought in Guitar Spotlight player Chris Arvan in 1989 as a replacement and performed a few shows, including one with Oni Logan from Lynch Mob. Soon, the members of the band went separate ways. Racer X's hiatus carried on well into the late 1990s.

=== 1990s ===
==== Separation ====
After Gilbert left for Mr. Big, other members also went on to other projects. Jeff Martin formed a short-lived outfit named Bad Dog with drummer Todd DeVito and former War & Peace and future Fight and Steel Panther guitarist Russ Parrish; the latter had also been part of Electric Fence, a side project featuring Martin and Paul Gilbert. Martin eventually went on to replace Eric Singer in Jake E. Lee's band, Badlands. After the demise of the final Racer X line-up, with former Roxanne vocalist Jamie Brown briefly taking over for Martin, Juan Alderete, Bruce Bouillet, and Scott Travis teamed up with former Angora vocalist John Corabi to form the band Black Cloud – which would later become The Scream. The four played one show at the Troubadour before Travis received an offer from Judas Priest, who were looking to replace the recently departed Dave Holland. Jeff Martin, a friend of Judas Priest, relayed the message to Travis, who was ecstatic at the opportunity, and accepted the offer. Travis would go on to record several albums with Judas Priest, and remains a member of the band to this day.

In 1992, Shrapnel Records released Extreme Volume II Live, which featured songs from the farewell Racer X concerts at the Country Club. Like the first live record, it included several previously unreleased songs, like "Poison Eyes" and "Give it to Me". The release gave die-hard Racer X fans hope that new material was on the way, but nothing came to fruition. The one most notable track is Racer X's cover of Kiss' "Detroit Rock City". Recording the song, Gilbert and Bouillet, wanting to make the song unique and fitting to their style, stood side by side and played the famous solo with their teeth. One other Kiss song was played the night before, "Cold Gin", but it never appeared on either of the first two live releases.

==== Reemergence ====
After departing Mr. Big in 1997 after the recording of the Hey Man album, Gilbert started a solo career releasing King of Clubs. Paul received an email from a man in Australia bashing him with anger, the famous "Snakebyte" email. In the email he chastised Paul for the more pop-oriented music on his solo records and accused him of forgetting his shred metal roots. Paul was apparently inspired to record heavy metal and decided to reform Racer X. Gilbert was joined by every original member except Bruce Bouillet, who did not choose to return. In mid-1999, the band recorded Technical Difficulties. The album went gold in Japan, and Racer X's new record label requested a follow-up. In late 2000, the band released what is recognized by many fans as their best album to date, Superheroes. The album's packaging featured pictures of the band members dressed as superheroes. Gilbert became the Electric Bat, Martin became Motorman, Alderete became The X-tinguisher, and Travis became Cowboy Axe. The record was mixed by former Racer X guitarist, Bruce Bouillet. In order to further capitalize on their new-found success in Japan, Universal Japan requested that the band record a live show for another live CD and DVD. On May 25, 2001, the band played their first live performance in thirteen years at the Whisky a Go Go in Los Angeles. The show was recorded for both audio and video, and in 2002, both the CD and DVD were released under the name Snowball of Doom, which is a reference to fact that the band is still "rolling along" after fifteen years, but was still unable to secure a major American record label contract.

==== Getting Heavier ====
In January 2002, in support of Superheroes and Snowball of Doom, Racer X toured Japan and Taiwan. The band performed these shows in their Superheroes costumes. For the final show, in Yokohama, the performance was hastily recorded in two tracks on the sound board, and this was later released as Snowball of Doom 2.

Gilbert returned to his solo career, recording the album Burning Organ. However, in 2002, Universal Japan pushed for another Racer X release, notifying the band that they would release an official bootleg of the Yokohama concert to promote a new album. In October 2002, all four members of Racer X gathered at Gilbert's house in Las Vegas to record a new album. For the first time in the history of the band all four members were together at the same time to record a Racer X album. The outcome of the recording was Getting Heavier, which was sold alongside Snowball of Doom 2 in a package deal.

After the release of Getting Heavier, Racer X's progress came to a halt. Scott Travis, with Judas Priest, toured with Ozzfest in 2004 and recorded Angel of Retribution. Jeff Martin began recording and touring with George Lynch, Kevin DuBrow, Michael Schenker, recorded a 3-song demo with the band Leatherwolf, and began a solo career with the release of The Fool in 2006. Juan Alderete joined the band The Mars Volta in 2003, which has toured regularly and recorded several albums. Paul Gilbert has released several solo albums, as well as compilation albums and tours with Dream Theater's previous drummer Mike Portnoy. Gilbert has toured with his supporting band in support of his latest albums.

==== Reunion ====
Racer X performed at the 2009 NAMM Show at the Anaheim Convention Center in Anaheim, California (the performance actually took place at the Sheraton Park Hotel ballroom next to the convention center), with a line-up consisting of Paul Gilbert, Scott Travis, Jeff Martin, and Juan Alderete. On October 13, 2009, the video game Brütal Legend was released. The game's soundtrack featured two Racer X songs: "Y.R.O." from Street Lethal and "Technical Difficulties" from Technical Difficulties. In 2020, bassist Juan Alderete got into a cycling accident. In support of him, Paul Gilbert finished and released an outtake from the Technical Difficulties sessions: a cover of the Partridge Family song "I Think I Love You", the first Racer X song in 18 years.

In 2024, Martin and Gschoesser would form the band Lethal X, whose debut album 90 Tons of Thunder featured Gilbert as a guest musician on several tracks.

== Band members ==
Final lineup

- Jeff Martin – vocals (1984–1989, 1997–2009)
- Juan Alderete – bass (1984–1989, 1997–2009)
- Paul Gilbert – guitars (1984–1988, 1997–2009)
- Scott Travis – drums (1986–1989, 1997–2009)

Past

- Harry Gschoesser – drums (1984–1986)
- Bruce Bouillet – guitars (1986–1989)
- Todd DeVito – drums (1986)
- Chris Arvan – guitars (1988–1989)
- Oni Logan – vocals (1989)

== Discography ==
=== Studio albums ===
- Street Lethal (1986)
- Second Heat (1987)
- Technical Difficulties (1999)
- Superheroes (2000)
- Getting Heavier (2002)

=== Live albums ===
- Extreme Volume I Live (1988)
- Extreme Volume II Live (1992)
- Snowball of Doom (2002)
- Snowball of Doom 2 (2002)

=== Video albums ===
- Live at the Whisky: Snowball of Doom (2002)
