= In for the Kill (Kevin DuBrow album) =

Studio album by Kevin DuBrow
- Released: May 25, 2004
- Recorded: 2004
- Genre: Hard rock, heavy metal
- Length: 48:46
- Label: Shrapnel
- Producer: Kevin DuBrow, Michael Lardie, Dave Stephens

Professional ratings
Review scores
Source	Rating
AllMusic	link

In for the Kill is a 2004 album by American rock and roll singer Kevin DuBrow, best known as a member of the group Quiet Riot. A collection of cover versions originally performed by other artists, it was DuBrow's only solo album before his death in 2007. The tracks are predominantly his version of 1970s rock songs.

== Track listing ==
1. “Burn on the Flame” (Sweet) 3:46
2. “Good Rocking Tonight” (Roy Brown) 3:04
3. “Black Sheep of the Family” (Quatermass) 4:21
4. “Speed King” (Deep Purple) 4:16
5. “Stay with Me” (Faces) 4:47
6. “Red Light Mama, Red Hot!” (Humble Pie) 6:22
7. “Gonna Have a Good Time” (The Easybeats) 4:05
8. “Modern Times Rock ’n’ Roll” (Queen) 1:47
9. “Drivin’ Sister” (Mott the Hoople) 4:08
10. “20th Century Boy” (T. Rex) 4:34
11. “Razamanaz” (Nazareth) 4:10
12. “Rolling with My Baby” (Silverhead) 3:26

== Personnel ==
Band:

- Kevin DuBrow - Lead and Backing vocals
- Michael Lardie - Guitars, Keyboards, Harmonica, Harp, Backing vocals
- Kevin Curry - Guitars
- Gunter Nezhoda - Bass guitar
- Jeff Martin - Drums, percussion

Additional performers:

- Chris Logan - Backing vocals
- Peter Marrino - Backing vocals
