= Kevin DuBrow =

American singer (1955–2007)

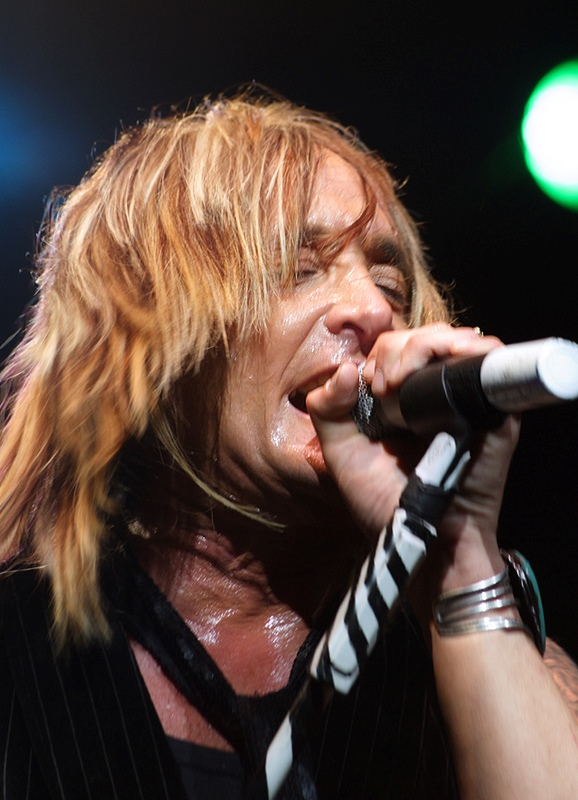
- DuBrow performing at the Del Mar Fairgrounds in July 2007

Background information
- Born: Kevin Mark DuBrow; October 29, 1955; Hollywood, California, U.S.
- Died: November 19, 2007 (aged 52) Las Vegas, Nevada, U.S.
- Genres: Heavy metal; hard rock; glam metal
- Occupations: Singer; songwriter
- Years active: 1973–2007
- Formerly of: Quiet Riot; DuBrow; Heat; Hear 'n Aid

Kevin Mark DuBrow (October 29, 1955 – c. November 19, 2007) was an American singer, best known as the lead vocalist of the heavy metal band Quiet Riot from 1975 until 1987, and again from 1993 until his death in 2007.

== Early life, photography work and family ==
Kevin DuBrow was born to Laura and Alvin Dubrow. He was raised in Los Angeles with his younger brother, Terry, who went on to become a plastic surgeon and TV personality. At age 13, Kevin and his family eventually settled in the Los Angeles neighborhood of Van Nuys. DuBrow was raised Jewish and had the nickname "Butch" growing up.

DuBrow learned to play 12-string guitar, and his first band consisted of 11-year-olds who played only one gig, to an audience of senior citizens who were not particularly fond of rock music. By the time he was in his mid-teens, he had developed an appreciation for a number of British rock acts including the Small Faces, Queen, Spooky Tooth, Rod Stewart and Humble Pie. Singer Steve Marriott would leave the biggest impact on DuBrow and act as a compass in his musical career.

DuBrow enjoyed a hobby of photography in his teenage years, often taking photos at rock 'n roll concerts from 1969 to 1975. He became proficient enough as a photographer that he was soon selling his photos to rock magazines for publication, including Rock and Guitar Player magazine. Among the acts he photographed were Jeff Beck, Robin Trower, and Mott the Hoople.

Through his photography work, he became friends with producer Ron Sobol, and the two traded photographs that they shot at concerts. Not long after Dubrow photographed Rod Stewart at a concert in 1970, he said he realized he wanted to be on the other side of the lens. He once commented: "Shooting concerts is what made me become a singer. I saw Rod Stewart in 1970. I was taking pictures, and I thought, 'Wow, I want to be up there! I don't wanna be behind the camera.'"

== Career ==
=== With Quiet Riot ===
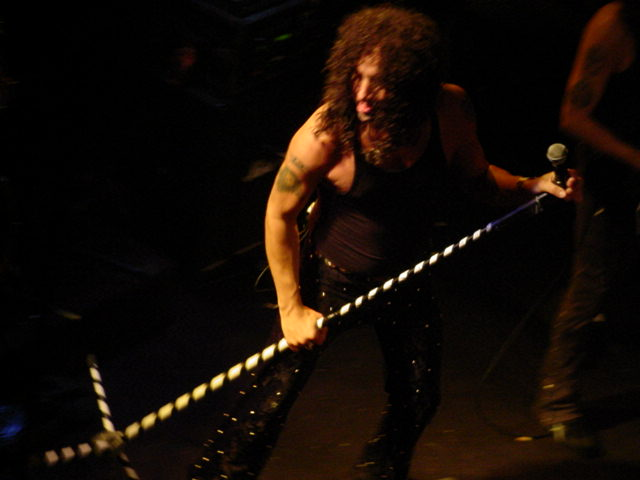
DuBrow performing

Quiet Riot was formed by Randy Rhoads and bassist Kelly Garni (who would later be replaced by Rudy Sarzo) in 1975, who recruited DuBrow and drummer Drew Forsyth. This lineup disbanded in 1979 when Rhoads went on to join Ozzy Osbourne's band, with Rhoads personally enlisting Greg Leon as his replacement. For a time the band's name was changed to DuBrow, which had a rotating lineup of members including Leon, Chuck Wright, Frankie Banali, with brothers Tony and Carlos Cavazo.

After the death of Rhoads in a plane crash in 1982, while on tour with Osbourne, DuBrow changed the name of the band back to Quiet Riot. Rudy Sarzo, who had also joined Ozzy Osbourne, left Osbourne's band and rejoined Quiet Riot shortly before the release of Metal Health, which went to the top of the charts, making Quiet Riot the first metal band to achieve number one status on their (U.S. release) debut album. Their singles included "Cum on Feel the Noize" (originally written and recorded by English band Slade in 1973), and "Metal Health (Bang Your Head)".

In February 1987, DuBrow was fired from Quiet Riot. “It wasn’t the band that wanted him out,” said drummer Frankie Banali in 2013. “It was management and the label. But it took the band to make the change.” However, DuBrow had a habit of publicly bad-mouthing other bands, which alienated a lot of musicians and fans, and also caused problems for Quiet Riot members (bassist Rudy Sarzo was famously punched in the face by Ozzy Osbourne after DuBrow publicly insulted the English singer). Another factor cited in the decision to fire DuBrow was his excessive drinking and drug use. “We all indulged," said Banali, "But Kevin could be told nothing by no one, and his lifestyle choices had made it impossible for us to continue with him.”

Shortly after his firing from Quiet Riot, DuBrow signed with Kim Richards for personal management. With Richards' help, DuBrow formed and began recording with a new band named Little Women. Richards, who was at that time working on the soundtrack for the Blake Edwards film Switch, arranged for the DuBrow-penned "Slam Dunk" to be included on the movie's soundtrack.

In 1991, DuBrow regrouped with his former Quiet Riot bandmate Carlos Cavazo alongside Kenny Hillery and Pat Ashby in a new band called Heat, (Quiet Riot had continued on in 1987 with new singer Paul Shortino of Rough Cutt but by this time had disbanded). In June 1991, Heat renamed themselves Quiet Riot. Quiet Riot continued through the 90s in several different incarnations, including a full reunion with the Metal Health-era line-up. They released the albums Terrified (1993), Down to the Bone (1995), Alive and Well (1999) and Guilty Pleasures (2001).

During 2006, Quiet Riot worked on a new studio album that was expected to be released in either 2006 or 2007. The band stated that they had set no timetable for the release of the album, that they were financing the project themselves, and that it would be released when they saw fit and on their terms. The album, Rehab, was released on October 3, 2006. The lineup on the album was DuBrow, Banali, Tony Franklin, and Neil Citron. Singer Glenn Hughes also made a guest vocal appearance on the album.

=== Other projects ===
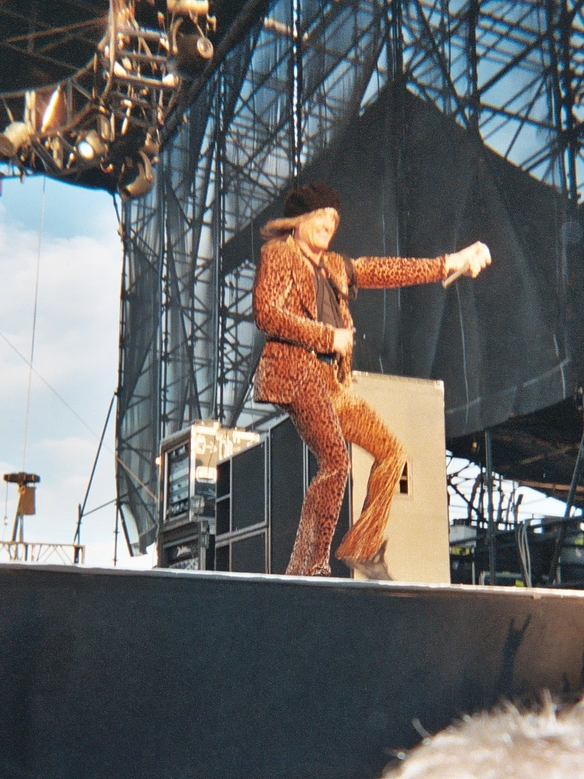
DuBrow in 2005

In 2004, after Quiet Riot's 2003 breakup, DuBrow recorded a collection of cover versions for his first solo album, In for the Kill. The album was recorded in DuBrow's home in Las Vegas, Nevada.

DuBrow also worked as a morning DJ for the Rock Station in Las Vegas, KOMP 92.3 on the morning show alongside longstanding host Craig Williams. Talk of show syndication had been heavily rumored but DuBrow departed the show to pursue touring with Quiet Riot.

== Personal life ==
DuBrow dated Las Vegas radio DJ Lark Williams for seven years, breaking up shortly before his death.

=== Death ===
On November 25, 2007, DuBrow was found deceased at his home in Las Vegas, Nevada. Friends had been unable to contact DuBrow for a week and he failed to show up for Thanksgiving dinner hosted by his friend Glenn Hughes. According to Hughes, DuBrow had told him some ten days before that he had wanted to make adjustments in his lifestyle. The cause of death was revealed to be an overdose by a combination of cocaine, sleeping pill Zolpidem, painkillers, and alcohol. It was also determined that he had died six days before being found. Nevertheless, his grave marker labels his death, "Nov. 25, 2007".

In an email to Spain's The Metal Circus, Quiet Riot drummer Frankie Banali wrote: "I can't even find the words to say. Please respect my privacy as I mourn the passing and honor the memory of my dearest friend Kevin DuBrow." DuBrow was buried at Pacific View Cemetery in Corona del Mar, California, next to his stepfather Harold Mandell. A rabbi presided over his funeral service on November 30, 2007.

== Discography ==
=== With Quiet Riot ===
- 1978 - Quiet Riot
- 1978 - Quiet Riot II
- 1983 - Metal Health
- 1984 - Condition Critical
- 1986 - QR III
- 1993 - Terrified
- 1995 - Down to the Bone
- 1999 - Alive and Well
- 2001 - Guilty Pleasures
- 2006 - Rehab

=== Solo ===
- 1985 - Hear 'n Aid benefit album - "Stars"
- 1998 - Thunderbolt: A Tribute to AC/DC – cover version of "Highway to Hell"
- 1998 - The Side Effects of Napalm by The Neanderthal Spongecake. Guest vocals on "Metal Health '98" remake
- 1999 - Appetite for Reconstruction Guns N' Roses electronic tribute album – cover version of "Welcome to the Jungle"
- 2000 - Leppardmania: A Tribute To Def Leppard - cover version of "Rock! Rock! (Till You Drop)"
- 2000 - Covered Like a Hurricane: A Tribute to Scorpions - cover version of "Big City Nights"
- 2004 - In for the Kill
- 2006 - World's Greatest Metal Tribute to Led Zeppelin – cover version of "Whole Lotta Love"
