= Street Lethal =

- Cover art by Guy Aitchison

Studio album by Racer X
- Released: January 1, 1986
- Studio: Prairie Sun Recording, Cotati, California
- Genre: Heavy metal; speed metal
- Length: 35:35
- Label: Shrapnel
- Producer: Steve Fontano; Mike Varney

Racer X chronology
Street Lethal (1986)	Second Heat (1987)

Street Lethal is the first studio album by the American heavy metal band Racer X, released on January 1, 1986 through Shrapnel Records. The instrumental track "Y.R.O." stands for "Yngwie Rip-Off", as it bears similarities to "Black Star" by guitarist Yngwie Malmsteen (from his 1984 album Rising Force), with an almost identical bassline. It later appeared in the 2009 video game Brütal Legend.

== Critical reception ==
Professional ratings
Review scores
Source	Rating
AllMusic	4.5/5 stars
Collector's Guide to Heavy Metal	6/10
Kerrang!	4/5 stars
Rock Hard	9.0/10

In a contemporary review, Paul Henderson of Kerrang! found Street Lethal "a pretty good album despite the occasional over-emphasis on 'melt-down' guitar pyrotechnics"; he praised the song structures, which he thought would more likely turn up on a Van Halen album, and the band's musicianship which "would put to shame many of the so-called 'big names' of heavy rock." Because of Jeff Martin's vocals and Paul Gilbert's rhythm guitar work, Rock Hard reviewer found similarities with the early works of Japanese bands Anthem and Loudness and concluded that "if you are on speed metal with level and melody, you can also blindly access this product from Mike Varney's inexhaustible talent supply".

Andy Hinds at AllMusic called Street Lethal "essentially a showcase for then teenaged guitar prodigy Paul Gilbert" and "skillfully executed, Judas Priest-style metal". Martin's singing was also likened to that of Judas Priest's Rob Halford and the rhythm section praised for "their part in maintaining the excitement." Hinds recommended the album for fans of shred, saying that it "has plenty to drool over." Canadian journalist Martin Popoff appreciated Paul Gilbert's rocking guitar "not in the classical fugue state so prevalent on other shred records" and the mix of speed metal with "sturdy party rock songs."

== Track listing ==
Side one
No.	Title	Writer(s)	Length
1.	"Frenzy" (instrumental)	Paul Gilbert	1:45
2.	"Street Lethal"	Gilbert, Jeff Martin	3:41
3.	"Into the Night"	Gilbert, Martin	3:34
4.	"Blowin' Up the Radio"	Gilbert, Martin	3:10
5.	"Hotter Than Fire"	Steve Fontano, Martin, Mark Lehman	3:02
6.	"On the Loose"	Gilbert, Martin	3:07

Side two
No.	Title	Writer(s)	Length
7.	"Loud and Clear"	Gilbert, Martin	3:42
8.	"Y.R.O." (instrumental)	Gilbert	3:13
9.	"Dangerous Love"	Gilbert, Martin	3:13
10.	"Getaway"	Gilbert, Martin	3:10
11.	"Rock It"	Gilbert, Martin	3:58
Total length:			35:35

== Personnel ==
Racer X

- Jeff Martin – vocals
- Paul Gilbert – guitar
- Harry Gschoesser – drums
- John Alderete – bass

Technical

- Steve Fontano – producer, engineer, mixing
- George Horn – mastering at Fantasy Studios, Berkeley, California
- Mike Varney – executive producer
- Guy Aitchison – cover art
