= We (Leo Ieiri album) =

Studio album by Leo Ieiri
- Released: July 6, 2016
- Genre: Pop
- Length: 55:18
- Label: Colourful Records

Leo Ieiri chronology
20 (2015)	We (2016)	Time (2018)

Singles from We
- 1. "Kimi ga Kureta Natsu" Released: August 19, 2015; 2. "Hello to the World" Released: February 17, 2016; 3. "Bokutachi no Mirai" Released: May 11, 2016

We (stylized as WE) is the fourth studio album by Japanese singer Leo Ieiri. It was released on July 6, 2016, through Colourful Records. The album yielded three singles, including "Hello to the World", "Bokutachi no Mirai" and the best-selling "Kimi ga Kureta Natsu".

== Background and release ==
The album and subsequent concert tour were announced jointly on May 27, 2016. Ieri has stated that the album's title represents the mindset of unity she felt while making the record, and she described the road from her self-titled debut to the inclusive We as a "journey". According to Ieri, the album is a dedication to all the people she has met along the way as well as a show of gratitude for everything that has transpired since the beginning of her career. We was released in two formats, one CD-only version, and a limited edition including a DVD featuring her Live at Zepp 2016: Two Colours concert held on February 2, 2016 at Zepp DiverCity and the music videos to "Hello to the World" and "Bokutachi no Mirai".

== Commercial performance ==
We entered the daily Oricon Albums Chart at number 5, where it also peaked. The album debuted at number 6, with 18,000 copies sold in its first week. It charted for seventeen weeks and sold a reported total of 34,000 copies during its run. We peaked at number 8 on the Billboard Japan Hot Albums chart and number 6 on the Top Albums Sales chart.

== Track listing ==
No.	Title	Writer(s)	Arranger(s)	Length
1.	"Bokutachi no Mirai"	Leo Ieiri; Jam; Kōichi Tabo	Tabo	4:25
2.	"Brand New Tomorrow"	Ieiri; Tabo	Tabo	4:40
3.	"Kimi ga Kureta Natsu"	Ieiri; Yoshihiko Nishio	Kikuo Satō	4:18
4.	"Kōkotsu" (恍惚, "Ecstasy")	Ieiri; Tabo; Yu Suto; Masaki Hori	Tabo; Suto	3:53
5.	"Party"	Ieiri	Tabo	3:23
6.	"I Wish"	Ieiri; Jam; Tabo	Akimitsu Honma	4:58
7.	"We"	Ieiri	Tabo	2:04
8.	"Hello to the World"	Ieiri; Tabo	Tabo	3:51
9.	"City Boy na Aitsu" (シティボーイなアイツ, Shiti Bōi na Aitsu,"He's a City Boy")	Ieiri; Tabo	Pop Etc	3:28
10.	"Sayonara Summer Breeze" (さよなら Summer Breeze, "Goodbye Summer Breeze")	Ieiri; Tabo	Tabo	5:00
11.	"Soba ni Ite, Radio" (そばにいて、ラジオ, Soba ni Ite, Rajio,"Stay by My Side, Radio")	Ieiri; Tabo	Tabo	4:57
12.	"Every Single Day"	Ieiri; Tabo	Tabo	5:31
13.	"Obake no Namida" (オバケのなみだ, "Tears of a Ghost")	Ieiri; Nishino	Kōdai Miwa	4:50
Total length:				55:18

Limited edition DVD
No.	Title	Length
1.	"Sabrina" (Acoustic) (Live at Zepp DiverCity 2016.2.2: Two Colours)
2.	"Miss You" (Live at Zepp DiverCity 2016.2.2: Two Colours)
3.	"Still" (Live at Zepp DiverCity 2016.2.2: Two Colours)
4.	"Lady Mary" (Live at Zepp DiverCity 2016.2.2: Two Colours)
5.	"Last Stage" (Live at Zepp DiverCity 2016.2.2: Two Colours)
6.	"Silly" (Live at Zepp DiverCity 2016.2.2: Two Colours)
7.	"Kimi ga Kureta Natsu" (Live at Zepp DiverCity 2016.2.2: Two Colours)
8.	"Kibō no Hoshi" (Live at Zepp DiverCity 2016.2.2: Two Colours)
9.	"Sabrina" (Live at Zepp DiverCity 2016.2.2: Two Colours)
10.	"Hello to the World" (Live at Zepp DiverCity 2016.2.2: Two Colours)
11.	"Hello to the World" (Music Video: Another Version)
12.	"Bokutachi no Mirai" (Music Video: Another Version)

== Charts ==
Chart (2016)	Peak position
Japan Daily Albums (Oricon)	5
Japan Weekly Albums (Oricon)	6
Japan Monthly Albums (Oricon)	21
Japan Hot Albums (Billboard)	8
Japan Top Albums Sales (Billboard)	6

== Sales ==
Region	Certification	Certified units/sales
Japan	—	34,000
