= Phi Brain: Puzzle of God =

Japanese anime television series

- Cover of the first DVD volume
- ファイ・ブレイン 神のパズル
- Genre: Adventure
- Created by: Hajime Yatate
- Written by: Mayori Sekijima; Junichi Sato (Season 2–3)
- Directed by: Junichi Sato (Season 1); Hirotaka Endo (Season 2–3)
- Music by: Akio Izutsu
- Country of origin: Japan
- Original language: Japanese
- No. of seasons: 3
- No. of episodes: 75 (list of episodes)

Production
- Production companies: NHK; Sunrise (Note: As of 2015, the copyright for this work was transferred to Bandai Namco Pictures.)

Original release
- Network: NHK Educational TV
- Release: October 2, 2011 – March 23, 2014

Related
- Manga
- Written by: Haruo Ueno
- Published by: Kodansha
- Magazine: Weekly Shonen Magazine
- Original run: April 27, 2011 – October 12, 2011
- Volumes: 3
- Video game

Phi Brain: Kizuna no Puzzle
- Developer: Arc System Works
- Publisher: Arc System Works
- Genre: Puzzle
- Platform: PlayStation Portable
- Released: JP: May 31, 2012

Phi Brain: Puzzle of God (ファイ・ブレイン 神のパズル, Fai Burein Kami no Pazuru) is a 2011 Japanese anime television series produced by Sunrise. The first two series aired on NHK Educational TV between October 2011 and September 2012, with a third season airing as of October 2013. The series is directed by Junichi Sato with script supervision by Mayori Sekijima. Hajime Yatate, the collective pen name for the creative staff at Sunrise, is credited with the original story. The anime has been licensed in North America by Sentai Filmworks. A manga adaptation by Haruo Ueno was serialized in Kodansha's Weekly Shonen Magazine from April 2011 to October 2011. A PlayStation Portable video game by Arc System Works was released on May 31, 2012.

== Plot ==
Kaito, a puzzle-loving high school freshman, is selected as a candidate for "Phi Brain". He and his friend Nonoha find an "unsolvable puzzle" near their school. The puzzle turns out to be a life-threatening "philosopher's puzzle" created by the mysterious group P.O.G. (Puzzle Of God). After successfully solving the puzzle, Kaito is designated as a Solver and is joined by other Solvers as they battle P.O.G. all over the world by solving the "philosopher's puzzles".

== Characters ==
=== Root Academy ===
Kaito Daimon (大門カイト, Daimon Kaito)
Voiced by: Shintarō Asanuma, Chiwa Saitō (young) (Japanese); David Wald (English)
Kaito is a high school freshman who enjoys solving puzzles, feeling insulted whenever they are used for hurting others as his parents were killed while attempting to solve a deadly puzzle. He carries the Solver title, 'Einstein'. One day, he discovers the Orpheus armband which attaches itself to his arm. Under high levels of stress, he enters a strange state that allows him to use his brain to its fullest potential and see the solution for any puzzle. Normally, the Orpheus armband glows in a bright golden light and shows Kaito the solution to the puzzle, after which he faints and is exhausted. As of the 20th episode, the armband has evolved along with Kaito (as observed by Rook). It now glows in a dark blue light and shows Kaito an almost apocalyptic future (including all of his dead friends), if he continues down a certain path. It is then that Kaito realizes that no one should get the "Divine Scrolls" sealed by Pythagoras that the P.O.G. wants. After the 23rd episode, the Orpheus Bangle shatters, but Kaito is still able to use his accelerated brain potential without losing his convictions.
Kaito does not seem to have many interests other than solving puzzles. As seen in the first episode, he will e.g. use school property (in that case school desks) to solve puzzles, if he can't "see" through them right away. His friend Nonoha scolds him for that and slacking off, not refraining from physical violence as well. Although it is still uncertain what kind of feelings he might have for her, Kaito cares a lot about Nonoha by not letting her come in harm's way. He even hides the fact that one of her friends, the kindergarten teacher Madoka, is in fact a P.O.G. Giver. Kaito is very outspoken about Nonoha's cooking, calling the "Nonoha sweets" "weapons of mass destruction", which causes Nonoha to punish him physically. As for now, Kaito is the only one who openly dislikes Nonoha's cooking.
Nonoha Itou (井藤ノノハ, Itō Nonoha)
Voiced by: Kaori Shimizu (Japanese); Luci Christian (English)
Kaito's childhood best friend, who always accompanies him when he goes to solve puzzles. She possesses great strengths, excelling at sports, and has a photographic memory, though she is not too good with actual puzzles. She often makes sweets that almost everyone finds delicious but Kaito is incredibly fearful of. After helping some kindergarten kids during a puzzle, she ends up with the title 'Nightingale'. This is a shock for her, since she sees everyone with a title as a "weirdo".
Throughout the series, it is heavily hinted that Nonoha has feelings for Kaito. She does not hesitate to stalk Kaito when there is another girl or woman involved. For this purpose, she always forces Gammon to tag along. However, she does not admit that fact to herself, often claiming it has nothing to do with her. She is also somewhat of a tsundere-type and takes her frustrations out on Kaito, mostly, when he insults her cooking.
Gammon Sakanoue (逆之上ギャモン, Sakanōe Gyamon)
Voiced by: Jun Fukuyama (Japanese); Christopher Patton (English)
A red haired Solver with the title, 'Galileo'. He solves puzzles for money purposes and is often trying to get ahead of Kaito in order to claim the purported treasures offered by the POG. He appears to have a crush on Nonoha and even enters a cross-dressing contest to show her his feminine side. Gammon has a very competitive rivalry with Kaito. He calls him "Bakaito", a combination of Kaito's name and the Japanese word "baka", meaning idiot (The English version uses "Daimoron", a combination of Kaito's last name and the word "moron'). He and Kaito seem to have quite a few similarities, their hot temper being the most obvious. He has shown on many occasions his ability at solving puzzles is way above many others', and can easily spot what even veterans might not see. For example, he was able to pinpoint that Kaito did not make a mistake during the battles with Freecell, and improvised accordingly. It is noted that he seems to be on par with Kaito, except when Kaito's rate of thinking is accelerated by the Orpheus Bangle.
Gammon is always seen with his leather jacket and pants, giving him a delinquent appearance along with his hairstyle and his way of talking. He also rides a motorcycle.
Upon realizing (after a plot by Rook to separate Kaito from his friends) that Kaito is on another level than him, Gammon does not simply cope with that by distancing himself from Kaito (like Cubic and Ana). After the P.O.G. finds out that he is in fact "Chido Setsu", a mysterious Puzzle Giver from a magazine, Gammon is invited by Himekawa Elena to join them. He eventually passes the test by Bishop and is invited by Rook to join him in the quest of solving the "Puzzle of God". It is then that Gammon makes a radical change in his personality. What used to be a competitive rivalry between him and Kaito turns (seemingly) into pure hatred. Gammon does not want Kaito to solve the "Puzzle of God" as he intends to do it for himself and prove to everyone that he is superior, both as a Solver and Giver. His true motives are yet to be revealed.
After engaging Kaito in a deadly puzzle for the sole purpose of crushing him, Kaito makes a mistake (after seeing the possible future) and is about to kill him, before being called back by Bishop, much to his dismay. It proves his resolve, however Rook and Bishop still remain doubtful of his loyalty towards the P.O.G. (as he is actually a Solver as well) and true motives.
Cubik Galois (キュービック・G, Kyūbikku Garoa)
Voiced by: Kōki Miyata (Japanese); Shannon Emerick (English)
A young boy with the title of 'Edison', who is often inventing various robotics. He is often more fascinated by mathematics as opposed to puzzles, though he takes interest in Kaito after witnessing his Phi-Brain in action. At first, he appeared to be self-centered, however this resulted from him being too young to understand the full extent of some of his actions. Nonoha calls him "Ku-kun", which is quite a common practice in Japan but makes various puns (like with the character Q from the James Bond series). He is fiercely loyal to Kaito and uses his gadgets to aid him as much as possible.
Ana Gram (アナ・グラム, Ana Guramu)
Voiced by: Satsuki Yukino (Japanese); Brittney Karbowski (English)
A rather effeminate cross-dressing boy with a knowledge of famous paintings who often enjoys painting himself. Ana also wins a cross-dressing contest of the school, without even entering. He supposedly has the ability to communicate with the spirits of those who created puzzles. He is a Solver with the title of 'Da Vinci', his name being a pun on the word anagram. He has an elder sister named Eve, who seems to have a connection with Mizerka from the Orpheus Order.
Souji Jikukawa (軸川ソウジ, Jikukawa Souji)
Voiced by: Akira Ishida (Japanese); Blake Shepard (English)
He is the president of the student council as well as the president of the puzzle club. He is mostly seen smiling around others (except the headmaster) and likes to drink boxed apple juice with a straw, which he states is his treasure. Initially, he was a Solver with the title of 'Newton' but was unable to obtain the Phi Brain in his freshman year. The headmaster introduces him to the P.O.G., where he became known as a Giver under the name of 'Minotaur' which was first hinted in the first episode. But this turns out to be another disguise, as he is in fact a member of the P.O.G. Section Φ. It is revealed that he despises the direction of the new P.O.G., especially the new Chief of Headquarters, who just use the puzzles as a means to commit murder. To prevent this, he hacks into P.O.G.'s server once, to help Kaito and give him the necessary information to solve the puzzle and save Nonoha and himself.
Souji is very worried about the well-being of his underclassmen, especially Kaito and his friends, as he vows to himself to guide them to the Puzzle of God. He is well respected within the student body. Even Kaito acknowledges the fact that Souji was able to turn an ugly puzzle into a beautiful one within seconds. Being unable to figure him out, it is hinted that Kaito starts suspecting Souji of being involved with the P.O.G., as Souji was the one who gave him the pager, at the end of the ninth episode.
Souji has not fully accepted the fact that he was rejected by the Orpheus Bangles yet, shown when the Orpheus Order made snide remarks about him not being qualified to be their opponent since they only do battles with children of Phi Brain.

Other students

- Tamaki Chieno (千枝乃 タマキ, Chieno Tamaki)

Voiced by: Rina Satō (Japanese); Carli Mosier (English)
Root Academy's student council vice president who has a crush on Souji. She is temporarily manipulated into being a member of the Orpheus Order when she thought Kaito was standing in the way between her and Souji, being given an Orpheus Earring, which later breaks when Kaito solves her puzzle.

- Airi Mizutani (水谷 アイリ, Mizutani Airi)

Voiced by: Mai Goto (Japanese); Cynthia Martinez (English)
A student at Root Academy. She is one of the members of the Puzzle Club. When Airi was little, she knew how to solve puzzles; but for some reason, she can't anymore. She is also pretty clumsy, e.g. falling on the stairs and dropping things in the cafeteria while carrying food. Just like Tamaki, she is also temporarily manipulated into being a member of the Orpheus Order, and her personality changes from the clumsy, cheerful girl into princess-like. However, her Orpheus Ring breaks later when Kaito solves her puzzle.

- Naoki Takeda (武田 ナオキ, Takeda Naoki)

Voiced by: Masahito Yabe (Japanese); Clint Bickham (English)
A member of Root Academy's Puzzle Club who is constantly challenging Kaito to Sudoku puzzles.

- Yuuichi Aizawa

=== Puzzle of God ===
Rook Banjo Crossfield (ルーク・盤城・クロスフィールド, Rūku Banjō Kurosufīrudo)
Voiced by: Takahiro Sakurai (Japanese); Greg Ayres (English)
Leader of P.O.G. Japan and Baron Pythagoras's confidant. He is also a P.O.G. Giver and dear childhood friend of Kaito.
Bishop (ビショップ, Bishoppu)
Voiced by: Mamoru Miyano (Japanese); John Gremillion (English)
Rook's right hand man.
Elena Himekawa (姫川 エレナ, Himekawa Erena)
Voiced by: Megumi Nakajima (Japanese); Shelley Calene-Black (English)
Elena is a 14-year-old idol, who is a P.O.G. Giver with the title "Antoinette". She hosts a show called "Puzzle Kingdom", and she is really popular. Although she has many personal problems - such as not working for something she's not pleased with or hating people who have friends.
She accidentally admits to Kaito and Nonoha that she fell in love with Gammon, despite the fact that both of them did not hear that. However, she is unsure of her feelings towards him, after Gammon joined the P.O.G. and told her of his true motives.
Baron Kaidou (解道バロン, Kaidō Baron)
Voiced by: Keiji Fujiwara (Japanese); Jay Hickman (English)
He is the headmaster of Root Gakuen High School. Throughout the series, there are very few things revealed about him, but his connection to the P.O.G. has been hinted on several occasions. In the ninth episode, it is revealed that Baron is the section-chief of Section Φ, a section within the P.O.G. with its own jurisdiction. He has opposed the new direction of the P.O.G. to turn puzzles into murderous threats, with no intention of letting the Solver survive. This was his motive for bringing Souji Jikugawa into his section and guiding Kaito and his friends to the Puzzle of God. Baron was also the one who brought Kaito to Root Gakuen High School and it is hinted in several flashbacks that he was involved in Kaito's past.
He defects from the P.O.G. after telling Kaito that his "parents" were in fact Givers chosen by the P.O.G. to raise him. The actual betrayal is the statement that they started loving him as their own child and taking on the Fool's Puzzle intended to "raise" Kaito to a new level, therefore not allowing him to come into harm's way. He shows Kaito a video of his puzzle room, when he hears them have an ordinary birthday celebration, without forcing him to solve puzzles and actually having fun. After that, Baron is taken in by the P.O.G. He returns, however, at the end of the 20th episode, seemingly on the P.O.G. island, and states (talking to an imaginary Jin) that the Divine Revelations are not meant for humankind.

=== Orpheus Order ===
A group dedicated to usage of the Orpheus artifacts to unlock mankind's hidden potential, which they believe was locked by Gods who were afraid of the humans' intelligence. A quint is sent to battle Kaito's group, led by a boy named Freecell.

Freecell (フリーセル, Furīseru)
Voiced by: Hiroshi Kamiya, Ayana Taketatsu (young) (Japanese); Christopher Ayres (English)
One of the Orpheus Order's members. He is the de facto leader of the group from the Orpheus Order that is often pitted against Kaito's group, of which all five are owners of Orpheus Bangles and thus, children of the Phi Brain. He appears to have a personal grudge against Kaito, believing a promise he broke to him caused his mother to die sad. He is revealed to be using a replica ring when he pushed his mind to its limits trying to save Kaito from a collapse and it turns into a real Orpheus ring.
Pinochle (ピノクル, Pinokuru)
Voiced by: Tomokazu Sugita (Japanese); Ty Mahany (English)
One of the Orpheus Order's members. Freecell's childhood friend. He is the most loyal to Freecell even though he sometimes feels intimidated by him. He specializes in researching one's patterns and developing a strategy against them. He has no qualms about using dirty tricks in order to win, especially psychological attacks. He is revealed to be using a replica ring when Kaito saves him and his ring breaks.
Doubt (ダウト, Dauto)
Voiced by: Daisuke Ono (Japanese); Andrew Love (English)
One of the Orpheus Order's members. He is the most physically overbearing of the quint. He has zero tolerance for nonsense and unpunctuality. He pledges absolute loyalty to Klondike and endures with Klondike's wishes no matter how much it goes against his own will. He is also the only one in the quint that does not feel intimidated by Freecell. He is revealed to be using a replica ring when he and Mizerka obtain confidential information about the Orpheus Order.
Melancholy (メランコリィ, Merankorī)
Voiced by: Momoko Saito (Japanese); Monica Rial (English)
One of the Orpheus Order's members. She always acts in an arrogant and selfish way, and together with her appearance, gives people the impression that she's a child. She addresses Mizerka as "elder sister", but it is not known whether the two are blood-related. Moreover, she seems to be the dominant one in the relationship, despite being the "younger sister". However, she finds Freecell scary at times, in the same way that Mizerka sometimes feels intimidated by Melancholy. It is noted that in an episode preview, she stated that she is not as young as she looks; whether that is canonical or not is unknown. She is the only member of Freecell's group with a genuine Orpheus ring, but has been concealing that fact as she is personally working with Klondike. She is the only one in the Orpheus Order to have a name that is not related to card games. However, it could have been taken from the fictional Perfect Melancholy game, which is a variation of the Concentration game in Medaka Box.
Mizerka (ミゼルカ, Mizeruka)
Voiced by: Yōko Hikasa (Japanese); Emily Neves (English)
One of the Orpheus Order's members. She seems to be acquainted with Ana's elder sister, Eve. She has stated that she hates free-spirited people like Ana. Freecell noted that Mizerka's puzzle-solving method is the most orthodox among the five, and she is usually the most cool-headed among them. She has ambivalent feelings towards Melancholy, liking her as a "younger sister" but also feeling intimidated by her at the same time. She is revealed to be using a replica ring when she and Doubt obtain confidential information about the Orpheus Order.
Whist (ホイスト, Hoisuto)
Voiced by: Katsuyuki Konishi (Japanese); Kyle Jones (English)
One of the Orpheus Order's members. He works as a butler and serves as Klondike's right-hand man. He also serves as a fair judge for the puzzle battles between Freecell's group and Kaito's group. A running gag involves Melancholy calling him "Whi" and Whist replying that his name is Whist instead, and addressing Melancholy as Lady Mela in a polite albeit cynical manner. He is later revealed to have been working with Freecell and betrays Klondike.
Klondike (クロンダイク, Kurondaiku)
Voiced by: Hori Hideyuki (Japanese); John Swasey (English)
Leader of the Orpheus Order. He joined the Orpheus Order at a young age and made it to the top with ease. Due to the fact that he was rejected by the Orpheus ring, he has been working on a way to create a perfect replica ring for himself to fulfil his own purposes. He does this by gaining data from the replica rings in Freecell's group. He succeeds in making the 'Final Ring' for himself, which is the perfect replica of the Orpheus Ring, when he absorbs Kaito's brainwaves.

=== Master Brain ===
Johan Sigmund Enigma (ヨハン・ジーグムント・エニグマ, Yohan Jīgumunto Eniguma)
Voiced by: Jōji Nakata
Johan Sigmund Enigma is the President of the Republic of Amgine.
Raetsel (レイツェル, reitseru)
Voiced by: Minori Chihara

A young girl who has a past with Jin; she has traveled the world with him solving Fools Puzzles. It was during this time that she receives her cat pendant from Jin, which she is seen wearing throughout the 3rd series. As he is going to solve a puzzle, Jin leaves her, never to see each other until the beginning of the series. It was soon after parting with Raetsel that Jin met Kitao and Rook at Greathenge.

=== Others ===
- Jin Makata (真方ジン, Makata Jin)

Voiced by: Takehito Koyasu (Japanese); H.K. Kahng (English)
A mysterious person of Kaito's childhood who had served as something of a mentor to Kaito and Rook.

- Shizuka Daimon (大門 シズカ, Daimon Shizuka)

Voiced by: Kazusa Murai (Japanese); Meaghan Avocado (English)
Kaito's deceased mother.

- Akira Daimon (大門アキラ, Daimon Akira)

Voiced by: Toshihide Tsuchiya (Japanese); Kyle Jones (English)
Kaito's deceased father.

- Count Pythagoras
- Miharu Sakanoue (逆之上ミハル, Sakanoue Miharu)

Voiced by: Ayana Taketatsu (Japanese); Maggie Flecknoe (English)
Gammon's 14-year-old little sister. She is really bad at cooking and seems to like her big brother very much.

== Media ==
=== Anime ===
The anime series by Sunrise began airing on NHK-Educational from October 2, 2011. The series uses two pieces of theme music, an opening theme and an ending theme. The opening theme is "Brain Diver" by May'n, while the ending theme is "Hologram" (ホログラム, Horoguramu) by Natsumi Kiyoura. The anime has been licensed in North America by Sentai Filmworks and they streamed the series on The Anime Network. The series began releasing on DVD and Blu-ray Disc from March 26, 2013. A second season aired between April 8, 2012, and September 23, 2012. The opening theme is "Now or Never" by Nano whilst the ending theme is "Super Step" (スーパーステップ, Sūpā Suteppu) by Ammoflight. For the third season, the opening theme is "Destiny" by neko while the ending theme is "Say Yeah!" by the Genius Terrace Set consisting of Shintarō Asanuma, Kaori Shimizu, Jun Fukuyama, Kouki Miyata and Satsuki Yukino. "diamond secret" by Raetsel (Minori Chihara) is used as the ending theme in season 3, episode 9. Two insert songs are used in the first season.

=== Manga ===
A manga adaptation illustrated by Haruo Ueno was serialized in Kodansha's Weekly Shonen Magazine from April 27 to October 12, 2011, and was collected in three volumes. Another manga, illustrated by Yoshiki Togawa, began serialization in Newtype Ace on November 11, 2011. A comic anthology was released on March 24, 2012.

=== Video game ===
A video game adaptation titled Phi Brain: Kizuna no Puzzle (ファイ･ブレイン ～絆のパズル; lit. 'Phi Brain: Puzzle of Bonds') was developed by Arc System Works for PlayStation Portable and released in Japan on May 31, 2012.
