= Time (Leo Ieiri album) =

Studio album by Leo Ieiri
- Released: February 21, 2018
- Genre: Pop
- Length: 55:10
- Label: Colourful Records

Leo Ieiri chronology
| 5th Anniversary Best (2017) | Time (2018) |

Singles from Time
- 1. "Zutto, Futari de" Released: July 26, 2017; 2. "Relax" Released: November 15, 2017

Time (stylized as TIME) is the fifth studio album by Japanese singer Leo Ieiri. It was released on February 21, 2018, by Colourful Records. The album includes the singles "Zutto, Futari de" and "Relax" as well as a solo vocal take of the collaboration single "Koi no Hajimari".

== Background and release ==
On December 20, 2017, Ieiri announced the release of her fifth studio album Time. It is Ieiri's first studio album in over a year in a half, since We (2016). The album was released in three different formats: a standard CD-only version, limited edition 'A', which comes with a DVD featuring Ieiri's 5th Anniversary Live at Zepp concert held on September 7, 2017, in its entirety, and limited edition 'B', which includes a different DVD featuring music videos, making-ofs and behind-the-scenes footage.

== Commercial performance ==
Time entered the daily Oricon Albums Chart at number 3, selling 6,000 physical units on its first charting day. It peaked the following day at number 2, moving another 3,000 copies. The album debuted at number 4 on the weekly Oricon Albums chart with first week sales of 15,000 copies. The album also charted on multiple Billboard Japan charts: at number 3 on both the Hot Albums and Top Albums Sales charts and number 8 on the Download Albums chart.

== Track listing ==
| No. | Title | Writer(s) | Arranger(s) | Length |
|---|---|---|---|---|
| 1. | "Zutto, Futari de" | Katsuhiko Sugiyama | Sugiyama; Shuho Mitani | 4:39 |
| 2. | "Harukaze" | Leo Ieiri; SoichiroK; Nozomu.S | Soulife; Nozomu.S; Yayoi Sekimukai | 4:35 |
| 3. | "Relax" | Yuuki Ozaki | Ozaki | 3:37 |
| 4. | "Koi no Hajimari" | Ieiri | Takashi Yamaguchi | 3:41 |
| 5. | "Tokyo" | Ieiri | Shogo Ohnishi | 3:49 |
| 6. | "After Dark" (アフターダーク, Afutā Dāku) | Ieiri; Yu Suto | Suto | 4:12 |
| 7. | "Fantasy" (ファンタジー, Fantajī) | Ieiri; Akimitsu Honma | nishi-ken | 4:12 |
| 8. | "Arikitari Desu ga" (ありきたりですが, This Is Cliché, But) | Sugiyama | Masayuki Sakamoto | 4:26 |
| 9. | "Datte Neko Dakara" (だってネコだから, "'Cause I'm a Cat") | Ieiri | Yamaguchi | 3:55 |
| 10. | "Papa no Tokei" (パパの時計, "Dad's Watch") | Ozaki | Ozaki | 4:05 |
| 11. | "Binetsu" (微熱, "Slight Fever") | Ieiri; Honma | Honma | 4:32 |
| 12. | "Inori no Melody" (祈りのメロディ, Inori no Merodi, "The Melody of Prayers") | Ieiri; Suto | Suto; Nozomu.S; Daisuke Kadowaki | 6:01 |
| 13. | "Daiji na Mono Subete" (大事なものすべて, "Everything That Matters") | Ozaki; Christopher Chu | Ozaki; Pop Etc | 4:26 |
| Total length: | | | | 55:10 |

Limited edition 'A' DVD
| No. | Title | Length |
|---|---|---|
| 1. | "Sabrina" |
| 2. | "Lost in the Dream" |
| 3. | "Kiss Me" |
| 4. | "Silly" |
| 5. | "Party Girl" |
| 6. | "Kōkotsu" |
| 7. | "Lay it Down" |
| 8. | "Kimi ga Kureta Natsu" |
| 9. | "Love & Hate" |
| 10. | "Ijiwaru na Kamisama" |
| 11. | "Hitonatsu no Keiken" |
| 12. | "Shōjo A" |
| 13. | "Datte Neko Dakara" |
| 14. | "Junjō" |
| 15. | "Bless You" |
| 16. | "Hello to the World" |
| 17. | "Bokutachi no Mirai" |
| 18. | "Shine" |
| 19. | "Zutto, Futari de" |

Limited edition 'B' DVD
| No. | Title | Length |
|---|---|---|
| 1. | "Relax" (Music Video) |
| 2. | "Relax" (Making Movie) |
| 3. | "Harukaze" (Short Film) |
| 4. | "Harukaze" (Music Video) |
| 5. | "Koi no Hajimari" (Recording Document) |

== Charts ==
| Chart (2018) | Peak position |
|---|---|
| Japan Daily Albums (Oricon) | 2 |
| Japan Weekly Albums (Oricon) | 4 |
| Japan Weekly Digital Albums (Oricon) | 6 |
| Japan Hot Albums (Billboard) | 3 |
| Japan Download Albums (Billboard) | 8 |
| Japan Top Albums Sales (Billboard) | 3 |

== Sales ==
| Region | Certification | Certified units/sales |
|---|---|---|
| Japan | — | 24,000 |
