= Iri (artist) =

Japanese musician

iri
- Born: March 15, 1994 (age 31); Zushi, Kanagawa, Japan
- Genres: Alternative R&B, Hip hop, Reggae
- Occupation(s): Musician, singer, songwriter
- Instrument(s): Vocals, guitar
- Years active: 2014–present
- Labels: Colourful Records
- Website: www.iriofficial.com

iri (イリ, stylized in lowercase; born March 15, 1994) is a Japanese singer-songwriter. She signed with Colourful Records in 2015, before releasing her first album in 2016.

== Early life and education ==
Upon entering high school, iri became interested in pursuing a career in music and opted to begin vocal training, instead of joining an after-school club, as is common in Japan. After entering university, iri taught herself how to play the acoustic guitar as well. During her time at university, iri performed at a jazz club, mainly in association with other jazz bands.

== Career ==
iri released her debut studio album "Groove it" on October 26, 2016, which charted #1 in the iTunes Store Japan hip-hop/rap chart. On March 22, 2017, iri released her first single "Watashi". The track was used in both Nike and Apple Music ads, which contributed to its popularity. In April of the same year, iri performed as one of the opening acts in Corinne Bailey Rae's Japan tour. iri furthermore performed in the 2017 "Sweet Love Shower" and the "Sunsets Festival" music and arts festivals. On November 22, 2017, iri released her first EP called "Life", which charted #1 in the iTunes Store Japan hip-hop/rap chart.

On February 28, 2018, iri published her second studio album "Juice". The physical release of the album was accompanied by photobook titled "Jubilee", which featured photographs of the artist. Between March 15 and March 21 of the same year, she performed her first headlining concert tour, titled "iri 1st Tour 2018". The tour was held at five different venues in Japan, during the span of six days. The "iri Presents “Night Dream” tour ran between December 17 and December 21, in three venues in Tokyo, Aichi and Osaka.

On March 6, 2019, her third full studio album "Shade" was released. Her third headlining tour "iri Spring Tour 2019 'Shade'" was held between April 5 and April 21, across nine different locations in Japan, making it the biggest tour of her career up to that point. iri's first overseas tour took place in China May 16-18, 2019.

On January 22, 2020, iri released the single "24–25". On March 25 of the same year, her fourth studio album "Sparkle" was released. She was initially expected to headlined a three-month tour titled "iri Spring Tour 2020", which was to be held between April 12 and June 7, which was later postponed due to the COVID-19 pandemic. As she was unable to perform live, due to restrictions place to combat the spread of COVID-19, Iri held an online performance on September 9. On November 25, iri released a single titled "I can't say". On December 2 she started "Wavy Club", her official fan club. Between December 11 and December 22 iri performed at the "Five Zepp Tour 2020".

On February 23, 2022, iri released her fifth studio album "neon". Following the release of this album, she held a tour lasting from May 15 and June 11. On June 29, 2022, iri released a new single called "Starlight". This preceded a sixth album, Private, which was released on May 10, 2023.

== Discography ==
=== Studio albums ===
- Groove It (2016)
- Juice (2018)
- Shade (2019)
- Sparkle (2020)
- Neon (2022)
- Private (2023)

=== Extended plays ===
- Life (2017)
- The Beginning of the Day (2021)
