= Colourful Records =

- Parent company: JVC Kenwood Victor Entertainment
- Founded: June 1, 2011
- Country of origin: Japan
- Official website: Official website

Colourful Records (カラフルレコーズ, Karafuru Rekōzu), is an imprint of the Japanese record label Victor Entertainment. The Colourful Records imprint was created on June 1, 2011 to specialize in the production and promotion of pop music acts.

== Artists ==
- Ammoflight
- Batten Showjo Tai
- Cocco
- Edda
- Going Under Ground
- Leo Ieiri
- Ayaka Ide
- Iri
- Kiroro
- Kaela Kimura (under the "ELA Music" sublabel)
- Kotone
- Mitsuhiro Oikawa
- Pile
- Rekishi
- Scandal (under the "her" sublabel)
- Ko Shibasaki
- Mariko Takahashi
- Xmas Eileen
- Aoi Yamazaki
- Yogee New Waves
- Rinne Yoshida
- M!LK
