= Leo Ieiri =

Japanese singer and songwriter (born 1994)

- 家入レオ
- Born: 13 December 1994 (age 31); Kurume, Fukuoka, Japan
- Occupations: Singer; songwriter; actress
- Years active: 2012–present
- Musical career
- Genres: Pop; pop rock
- Instrument: Vocals
- Label: Victor Entertainment
- Website: www.leo-ieirimobile.com

Leo Ieiri (家入レオ, Ieiri Reo), born 13 December 1994 in Fukuoka Prefecture, is a Japanese singer and songwriter. Her song "Sabrina" was used as the third ending song of the anime television series Toriko and her song "Silly" was used as the theme song for the television adaption of popular novel "Nのために" ("For N").

== Biography ==
Ieiri was born in Kurume and grew up in Fukuoka. She wanted to be a singer at the age of 13 and came to study under Ongaku-juku Voice (音楽塾ヴォイス, the Music School Voice) presided over by record producer Yoshihiko Nishio. Her stage name comes from the movie Léon: The Professional, and also comes from Leo of Kimba the White Lion because her eyes resemble a lion.

In the spring of 2011, she left home and went to Tokyo alone, leaving her parents. She continued doing musical activities while going to the high school in Tokyo and made her debut on 15 February 2012.

On 18 February 2014, a music video for the song "A Boy", which has an animated part made by Tezuka Productions, features an anime version of the singer (based on Kimba and modeled after the singer) which meets other characters from the Kimba the White Lion series.

She sung the theme song for the Japanese version of The Secret Life of Pets called "Brand New Tomorrow".

== Discography ==
=== Albums ===
==== Studio albums ====
List of studio albums, with selected chart positions
Title	Album details	Peak positions	Certifications
Title	Album details	JPN	Certifications
Leo	Released: 24 October 2012 (JPN); Label: Victor Entertainment; Formats: CD, digital download	2	RIAJ: Gold
A Boy	Released: 19 February 2014 (JPN); Label: Victor; Formats: CD, digital download	4	
20	Released: 25 February 2015 (JPN); Label: Victor; Formats: CD, digital download	6	
We	Released: 6 July 2016 (JPN); Label: Victor; Formats: CD, digital download	6	
Time	Released: 21 February 2018 (JPN); Label: Victor; Formats: CD, digital download	4	
Duo	Released: 17 April 2019 (JPN); Label: Victor; Formats: CD, digital download	6	
Answer	Released: 13 May 2020; Label: Victor; Formats: CD, digital download	8	
Naked	Released: 15 February 2023; Label: Victor; Formats: CD, digital download	7	
My Name	Released: 2 October 2024; Label: Victor; Formats: CD, digital download	8	
31	Released: 26 August 2026; Label: Victor; Formats: CD, digital download	15	

==== Compilation albums ====
List of compilation albums, with selected chart positions
Title	Album details	Peak positions
Title	Album details	JPN
5th Anniversary Best	Released: 15 February 2017 (JPN); Label: Victor Entertainment; Formats: CD, digital download	3
10th Anniversary Best	Released: 16 February 2022 (JPN); Label: Victor Entertainment; Formats: CD, digital download	4

==== Live albums ====
Title	Album details
Leo: 1st Live Tour	Released: 30 March 2013 (JPN); Label: Victor; Formats: Digital download
A Boy: 3rd Live Tour	Released: 14 March 2015 (JPN); Label: Victor; Formats: Digital download

=== Singles ===
List of singles, with selected chart positions
Title	Year	Peak chart positions		Certifications	Album
Title	Year	JPN Oricon	JPN Hot 100 (Note: Sources for chart positions are as follows: "Sabrina", "Shine", "Bless You", "Say Goodbye", "Message", "Kimi ni Todoke", "Taiyō no Megami", "Chocolate", "A Boy", "Junjō", "Silly", "Miss You", "Kimi ga Kureta Natsu", "Hello to the World", "Zutto, Futari de", "Moshi Kimi wo Yurusetara", "Kono Sekai de", "Mikansei", "Sora to Ao".)	Certifications	Album
"Sabrina" (サブリナ, Saburina)	2012	9	2	RIAJ (download): Platinum	Leo
"Shine"	2012	7	2	RIAJ (download): Platinum	Leo
"Bless You"	2012	8	3	RIAJ (download): Gold	Leo
"Message"	2013	9	4		A Boy
"Kimi ni Todoke" (君に届け; "Reaching You")	2013	—N/a	9		A Boy
"Taiyō no Megami" (太陽の女神; "Goddess of the Sun")	2013	7	3	RIAJ (download): Gold	A Boy
"Chocolate" (チョコレート, Chokorēto)	2014	9	2		A Boy
"Junjō" (純情; "Pure Heart")	2014	11	5		20
"Silly"	2014	13	3	RIAJ (download): Platinum	20
"Miss You"	2015	11	4		20
"Kimi ga Kureta Natsu" (君がくれた夏; "The Summer You Gave Me")	2015	6	1	RIAJ (download): 2× Platinum; RIAJ (streaming): Platinum	We
"Hello to the World"	2016	9	6		We
"Boku-tachi no Mirai" (僕たちの未来; "Our Future")	2016	14	7	RIAJ (download): Gold	We
"Zutto, Futari de" (ずっと、ふたりで; "Forever, the Two of Us")	2017	14	12	RIAJ (download): Gold	Time
"Moshi Kimi wo Yurusetara" (もし君を許せたら; "If I Can Forgive You")	2018	16	6	RIAJ (download): Gold	Duo
"Kono Sekai de" (この世界で; "In This World")	2019	20	31		Duo
"Mikansei" (未完成; "Incomplete")	2020	12	14	RIAJ (streaming): Platinum	10th Anniversary Best
"Sora to Ao" (空と青; "Sky and Blue")	2021	9	40		10th Anniversary Best
"Remon So-da" (レモンソーダ; "Lemon Soda")	2022	—	—		
"Pain"	2022	—	—		
"Kawaii Hito" (かわいい人; "Adorable Person")	2022	—	—		
"Shooting Star" (シューティングスター)	2023	—	—		
"Binkan"	2023	—	—		
"Waltz" (ワルツ)	2024	17	—		
"Mirror"	2025	6	—		
"—" denotes items that did not chart. "N/A" denotes items which were not eligible to chart due to no physical edition being released.

=== Promotional singles ===
List of promotional singles, with selected chart positions
Title	Year	Peak chart positions	Album
Title	Year	Billboard Japan Hot 100	Album
"Say Goodbye"	2012	46	Leo
"A Boy"	2014	37	A Boy
"Little Blue"	2015	— (Note: Charted at number 68 on the Billboard Adult Contemporary Airplay sub-chart.)	20
"Sorezore no Ashita he"	2016	—	5th Anniversary Best
"Relax"	2017	—	Time
"—" denotes items which were did not enter the main Billboard chart.

=== Video albums ===
List of media, with selected chart positions
Title	Album details	Peak positions	
Title	Album details	JPN DVD	JPN Blu-ray
Leo: 1st Live Tour	Released: 27 March 2013 (JPN); Label: Victor; Formats: DVD, Blu-ray	49	38
A Boy: 3rd Live Tour	Released: 30 July 2014 (JPN); Label: Victor; Formats: DVD, Blu-ray	18	24
20: 4th Live Tour	Released: 18 November 2015 (JPN); Label: Victor; Formats: DVD, Blu-ray	18	29
5th Anniversary Live at Nippon Budokan	Released: 26 July 2017 (JPN); Label: Victor; Formats: DVD, Blu-Ray	23	24
Time: 6th Live Tour	Released: 12 December 2018 (JPN); Label: Victor; Formats: DVD, Blu-Ray	18	15
Duo: 7th Live Tour	Released: 11 December 2019 (JPN); Label: Victor; Formats: DVD, Blu-Ray	11	19
LEO IEIRI Streaming Live 2020 at Studio Coast	Released: 25 August 2021 (JPN); Label: Victor; Formats: DVD, Blu-Ray		
10th Anniversary Live at Tokyo Garden Theatre	Released: 6 July 2022 (JPN); Label: Victor; Formats: DVD, Blu-Ray		
THE BEST ~8th Live Tour~	Released: 29 March 2023 (JPN); Label: Victor; Formats: DVD		
NAKED ~TOUR 2023~	Released: 13 March 2024 (JPN); Label: Victor; Formats: DVD, Blu-Ray		
My name ~TOUR 2024~	Released: 6 August 2025 (JPN); Label: Victor; Formats: DVD, Blu-Ray		

== Filmography ==
List of television and films credits
Year	Title	Role	Notes
2017	Shinjuku Seven	Shiori	

== Awards ==
=== Japan Record Awards ===
The Japan Record Awards is a major music awards show held annually in Japan by the Japan Composer's Association.

Year	Nominee / work	Award	Result
2012	Leo Ieiri	New Artist Award	Won
2012	Leo Ieiri	Best New Artist Award	Won
2013	Leo Ieiri	Excellent Music Award	Won
2013	Leo Ieiri	Grand Prix	Nominated

=== Mnet Asian Music Awards ===
The Mnet Asian Music Awards is a major annual Korean Awards ceremony.

Year	Nominee / work	Award	Result
2014	Leo Ieiri	Asian Artist of the Year in Japan	Won

=== Space Shower Music Awards ===
Year	Nominee / work	Award	Result
2016	Leo Ieiri	Best Female Artist	Nominated

=== Television Drama Academy Awards ===
Year	Nominee / work	Award	Result
2015	Kimi ga Kureta Natsu	Best Theme song	Won
2014	Silly	Best Theme song	Won

== Notes ==
Preceded by Fairies	Japan Record Award for Best New Artist; 2012	Succeeded by Kōta Shinzato
