= Ammoflight =

Japanese pop rock band

ammoflight
- Origin: Odawara, Kanagawa, Japan
- Genres: J-pop, pop rock, alternative rock
- Years active: 2008-2015 (on hiatus)
- Labels: Hot Stuff, Japtover, Space Shower Music, Victor
- Members: Koji Tsukui; Yosuke Kubota; Naoto Toriizuka; Kazushige Kasai

ammoflight was a Japanese pop rock band formed in 2008, from Odawara, Kanagawa, Japan. The band is on hiatus.

The band is known for their 2012 single, "Natsuiro Dot", which peaked at number 7 on the Billboard Japan Hot 100.

== Members ==
- Koji Tsukui - lead vocals, guitar
- Yosuke Kubota - lead guitar, backing vocals
- Naoto Toriizuka - bass
- Kazushige Kasai - drums, percussion

== Discography ==
=== Albums ===
==== Studio albums ====
| Year | Album details | JPN |
|---|---|---|
| 2013 | FLASH4: Released: July 3, 2013; Formats: CD, digital download; Label: Victor Entertainment | 146 |

==== Extended plays ====
| Year | Album details |
|---|---|
| 2009 | philosofiles: Release Date: June 5, 2009; Formats: CD, digital download; Label: Hot Stuff, Space Shower Music (re-issue) |
| 2010 | Switch: Release Date: November 28, 2010; Formats: CD; Label: Japtover |
| 2011 | Truthpeaker: Release Date: June 8, 2011; Formats: CD; Label: Japtover |

=== Singles ===
| Year | Song | Peak chart positions | | | Album |
| Year | Song | JPN | JPN CD | JPN Radio | Album |
|---|---|---|---|---|---|
| 2012 | "Sakura Graffitti" | 85 | 145 | 72 | FLASH4 |
| 2012 | "Natsuiro Dot" | 7 | 87 | 2 | FLASH4 |
| 2012 | "Altarf: Kono Koi no Owari ni" | 99 | 159 | 72 | FLASH4 |

=== Promotional singles ===
| Year | Single | Peak chart positions | Album |
| Year | Single | JPN | Album |
|---|---|---|---|
| 2012 | "Super Step" | - | FLASH4 |
| 2012 | "cheese :)" | - | FLASH4 |
| 2013 | "Betsubara Sweet" | - | Non-album singles |
