= Mark Dawson =

British talent agent

- Born: Mark Richard Dawson; 4 February 1960 (age 65); London, England
- Occupation: Entertainment Business
- Parents: Richard Dawson (father); Diana Dors (mother)
- Website: DRZ Entertainment Group

Mark Richard Dawson (born 4 February 1960) is a British-American entertainment manager and CEO of Dawson, Reeves and Zutaut Entertainment Group (otherwise known as DRZ Entertainment Group), based in Los Angeles.

== Life and career ==
Dawson was born in London, the first son of the actor and game show host Richard Dawson and the actress Diana Dors. A young Dawson appeared with his father on a few early episodes of Family Feud. He worked as an assistant to the producer Mark Goodson and as a showcase and question writer for The Price Is Right, Concentration, The Better Sex, Match Game and Family Feud. His father once introduced him on a telecast of Family Feud to promote his band The Midnight Ives and had an appearance with Ronnie Mars on Dinah! He was a creative consultant of the latter show's second run, with his father as host from 1994 to 1995. Dawson was also an associate producer at Rastar Productions and at NBC for You Bet Your Life, a remake based on a Groucho Marx TV program from the 1950s that his father's production company produced in the 1980s. In 2001, he was hired by Paul Schrader as a technical advisor for the movie Auto Focus.

In March 1979, Dawson married Cathy Hughart, an assistant producer on his father's Family Feud show. "I could not have chosen a classier spouse for my son or a more wonderful person than Cathy," Richard Dawson said. The two later divorced. Mark Dawson married Eleidys Carrasco in September 2019 in Colombia. Together, they have a daughter named Victoria Dawson, born on her paternal grandmother's birthday, 23 October 2018.

Dawson manages the all-female tribute band The Iron Maidens, the cover band Crabby Patty, and the all-female heavy metal band Phantom Blue. Drummer Linda McDonald is a member of all three bands. In 2008, with Brad and Tom Zutaut, he developed a tribute bands television show for New Wave Entertainment.

=== Mother's alleged 'missing millions' ===
Diana Dors allegedly claimed to have hidden more than £2 million in various European banks. In 1982, she reportedly gave Dawson a sheet of paper on which, she told him, was a code that would reveal the money's whereabouts. His stepfather, Alan Lake, supposedly knew the key that would crack the code. Still, when Lake died by suicide very soon after Dors' death, Dawson was left with an unsolvable puzzle.

He sought out computer forensic specialists Inforenz, who recognised the encryption as the Vigenère cipher. Inforenz then used their own cryptanalysis software to suggest a ten-letter decryption key, DMARYFLUCK (short for Diana Mary Fluck, Dors's real name). With the aid of a bank statement found among Alan Lake's papers, Inforenz was then able to decode the existing material to reveal a list of surnames and towns only – suggesting that there must be a second page that would reveal first names and bank details, to complete the message. As this second page has never come to light, no money has ever been traced. In 2003, Channel 4 made a television programme about the mystery.

== Selected filmography ==
=== Production ===
- Concentration – production assistant, editorial staff, rebus writer, assistant contestant coordinator (1976–1977)
- Match Game – editorial staff (1976)
- Tattletales – editorial staff (1976)
- The Better Sex – music coordinator (1977)
- Family Feud – editorial staff (1977–1985); creative consultant (1994–1995)
- The Price Is Right – showcase writer (1977)
- Card Sharks – music coordinator, production assistant (1978)
- Nudity Required – associate producer (1988)
- You Bet Your Life – associate producer (1988)
- Auto Focus – technical advisor (2002)
- The Iron Maidens Live at Galaxy Theater – director (2007)

=== Acting/appearances ===
- Family Feud – Himself (select episodes)
- Who Got Diana Dors' Millions – Himself

== Discography ==
=== The Midnight Eyes ===
- At the Roxy – (1980)

=== Phantom Blue ===
- Caught...Live! – producer (1997)
- Full Blown – producer (1998)

=== The Iron Maidens ===
- World's Only Female Tribute to Iron Maiden – co-producer (2005)
- Route 666 – co-Producer (DVD) (2007)
- The Root of All Evil – co-Producer (2008)
- Metal Gathering Tour 2010 – Japan – co-Producer (2010)
