= Kirsten Rosenberg =

American singer (born 1969)

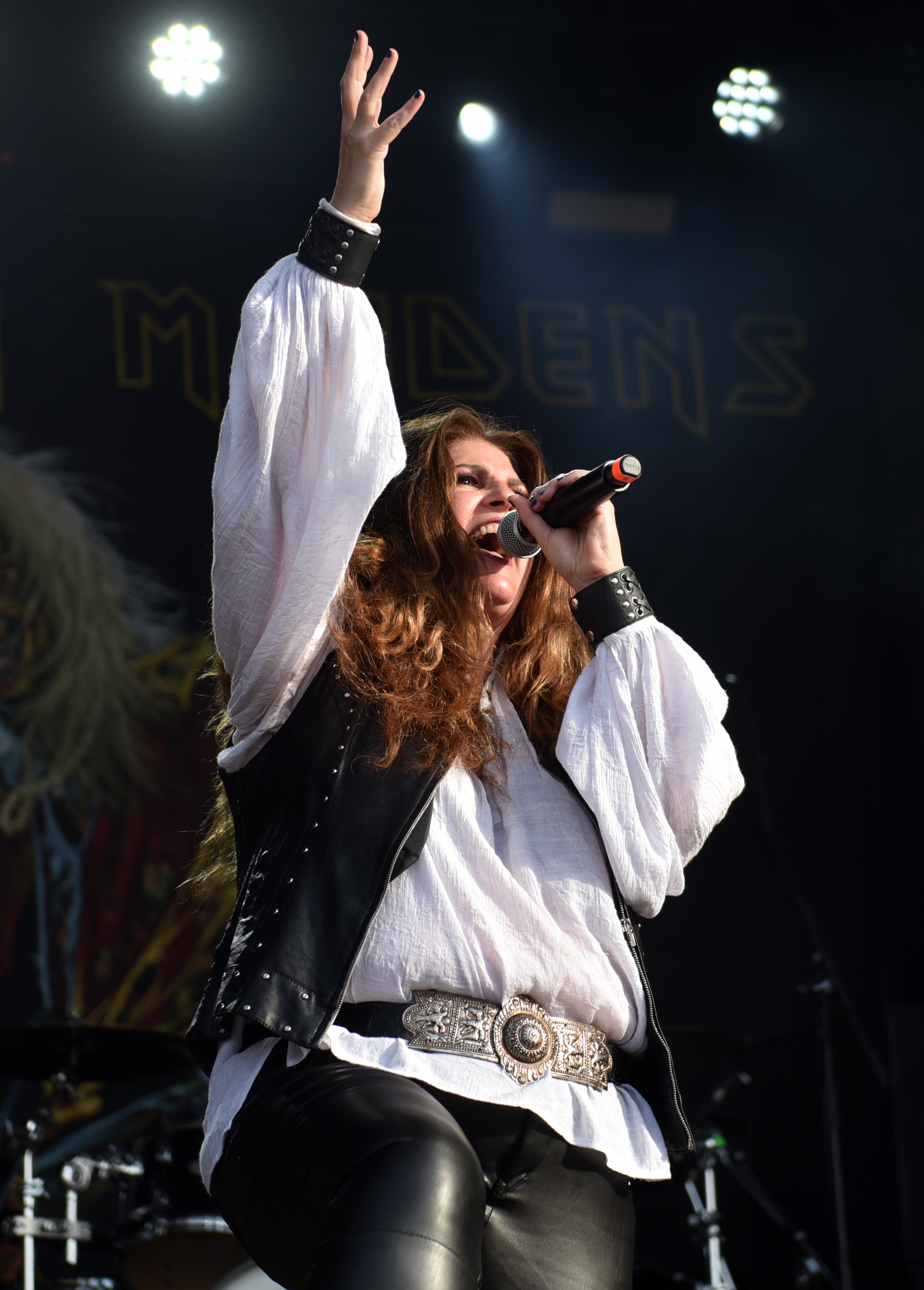
- Rosenberg in 2022

Background information
- Also known as: Bruce Chickinson (The Iron Maidens)
- Born: January 21, 1969 (age 56)
- Genres: Heavy metal, tribute
- Occupation: Singer
- Labels: Powerslave Records
- Website: theironmaidens.com

Kirsten Rosenberg (born January 21, 1969) is an American singer, currently with the all-female tribute band The Iron Maidens. She is also an animal rights and veganism advocate, as well as a former co-owner of Sticky Fingers, an all-vegan bakery in Washington, D.C.

== Career ==
In 1991, Rosenberg became involved in the production of the Genesis Awards television special that is aired each year and which honors individuals in the major news and entertainment media for producing outstanding works that raise public awareness of animal issues. In 1996, she accepted an appointment from Kim Stallwood to join the staff of The Animals' Agenda magazine as Assistant Editor; she later became the Managing Editor. The Animals' Agenda was a bimonthly animal rights magazine (1979–2002).

Rosenberg spoke at the Third Annual United Poultry Concerns Forum on December 8, 2001, on the subject "Throwing the Baby Out With the Battery Cage: Looking Out for Animals' Welfare in the Pursuit of Rights". Her talk was described by Mary and Frank Hoffman as follows:

Kirsten's presentation came across as a "business approach" to arriving at our goals of eliminating animal suffering. She expressed that politics is the art of compromise, and that in our pursuit of animal rights in the future, we need to find ways to lessen the suffering of animals in our present time. "Historically, divisiveness is deadly", she said, and we need to support all actions that will help the animals, even in minor ways.

Rosenberg's own abstract for her talk was as follows:

What do animal rights advocates want? For most avowed rightists, that's easy: The complete liberation of animals from human exploitation as quickly as possible. Yet while we work diligently to achieve such a status for animals over the long term, we also have a duty to respect the "rights" of those individuals who are currently suffering to a life less miserable. To dismiss opportunities to ameliorate their pain and distress is to treat those animals as mere abstractions rather than as sentient beings inherently worthy of consideration now-a position, ironically, often held by the very exploitive institutions we seek to overturn.

After The Animals' Agenda closed down, Rosenberg relocated to Washington, D.C., where she met Doron Petersan through her animal rights activism. Inspired by her desire to promote veganism, she joined in Petersan's restaurant business, Sticky Fingers, remaining as co-owner until she decided to focus instead on singing.

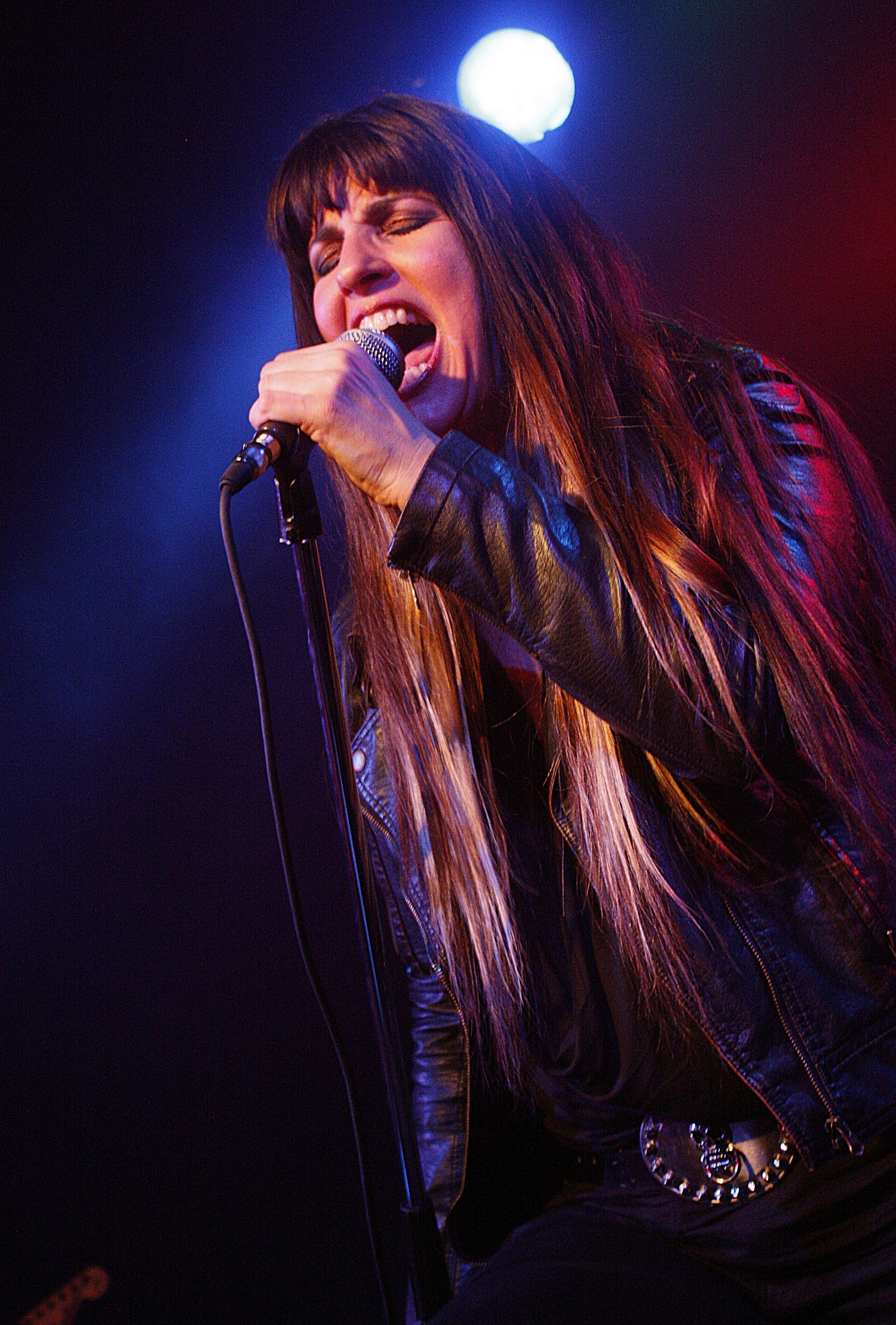
Rosenberg performing in 2011

In April 2009, Kirsten Rosenberg made her debut as the new lead vocalist of the Los Angeles-based tribute band The Iron Maidens ("World's Only Female Tribute to Iron Maiden). Prior to this, she was the lead vocalist of a cover band in Linthicum, Maryland called Highwire. Rosenberg's favorite Iron Maiden songs are "Moonchild", "Back in the Village", "Infinite Dreams", "Revelations" and "Aces High".

In addition to The Iron Maidens, Rosenberg is the lead vocalist of the cover band Crabby Patty (I'm So Unclear!), which also features Maidens bandmates Courtney Cox and Linda McDonald.

Aside from Bruce Dickinson, Rosenberg's musical influences include Geoff Tate, Ann Wilson, Doro Pesch, Robin Zander and Pat Benatar, as well as Karen Carpenter, Barbra Streisand and Christina Aguilera.

Rosenberg and bandmate Nikki Stringfield appeared as contestants on the August 3, 2017 episode of the music game show Beat Shazam.

== Personal life ==
The daughter of Pulitzer Prize-winning critic Howard Rosenberg, Rosenberg became a vegetarian when she was twelve years old and a vegan in 1994. She was 34 at the time of a 2003 newspaper article. She was formerly married to Wayne Pacelle of the Humane Society of the United States.

== Discography ==
=== Videos ===
- Metal Gathering Tour Live in Japan 2010 (2010)

== Equipment and endorsements ==
Kirsten Rosenberg is endorsed by BBE Sound, Sennheiser and Monster Energy Drink.

Kirsten is endorsed by Blakhart Coffee.

== Published articles ==
Among Rosenberg's many published articles are these:

- Rosenberg, Kirsten (July 31, 1999). "USDA Falls 90% Short of the Job". The Animals' Agenda. ISSN 0892-8819. Archived from the original on March 5, 2000. "... for nearly 25 years, the agency has ignored mice, rats, and birds by classifying them as 'non-animals' under the AWA, despite the fact that mice and rats account for 90 percent of the animals used in research."
- Rosenberg, Kirsten (October 15, 1999). "Something to Believe In: an interview with Rikki Rockett". The Animals' Agenda. ISSN 0892-8819. Archived from the original on September 21, 2012. "... this rocker is a committed and very active animal rights advocate." See also: Rikki Rockett.
- Rosenberg, Kirsten (April 2, 2000). "A Star Is Cloned". The Animals' Agenda. ISSN 0892-8819. "Animals cloned by 'nuclear transfer' are found to contain genetic material from both the adult animal whose DNA was used and the one who supplied the egg, which means the resulting animal is actually not a 100 percent clone."
- Rosenberg, Kirsten (January 31, 2001). "Animals Win in Majority of State Initiatives". The Animals' Agenda. ISSN 0892-8819. Archived from the original on July 8, 2001. "On November 7, voters around the country sided in favor of animals in five out of nine ballot measures addressing animal protection."
