= Melanie Sisneros =

American musician

- Birth name: Melanie Ann Sisneros
- Also known as: Mellefson (Hangar 18); Steve Heiress (The Iron Maidens)
- Origin: New Mexico, United States
- Genres: Heavy metal, tribute
- Occupation(s): Musician, desktop support Pomona College
- Instrument: Bass guitar
- Years active: 1996—present
- Labels: Cruz del Sur Music, Pure Steel
- Website: mel.raven-mad.com

Melanie Sisneros is an American bassist and a member of four bands: Crescent Shield, Whole Lotta Rosies (an all-female AC/DC tribute band), Hangar 18 (a Megadeth tribute band) and Mz Led (an all-female Led Zeppelin tribute band). She is also a former member of the bands Sinergy, The Iron Maidens and New Eden.

== Biography ==
Melanie Ann Sisneros was born the second of three daughters and raised in various towns in New Mexico. She graduated cum laude from Pomona College in Claremont, California, in 1994, majoring in Latin and Greek languages.

In early 1998, Sisneros and guitarist/vocalist William Rustrum formed a local band called Raven Mad. The band released two albums before disbanding in December 2000. She joined the heavy metal band New Eden in January 2001 and stayed with them for over a year.

In June 2000, Sisneros joined the Iron Maiden tribute band Wrathchild, where she took the stage name "Steve Heiress" (a female version of bassist Steve Harris). A year later, she and lead vocalist Jenny Warren co-founded The Iron Maidens ("World's Only Female Tribute to Iron Maiden") with former Phantom Blue members Linda McDonald and Josephine Draven and former Bandit member Sara Marsh. Her stay with the band lasted a year before leaving both the Maidens and New Eden to join the Finland-based power metal band Sinergy. Unfortunately, she lasted all but one gig with Sinergy before the band released her.

Shortly after returning to the U.S., Sisneros joined the heavy metal band Crescent Shield in 2003. They have one album - The Last of My Kind - and are signed with Italian label Cruz del Sur Music and German label Pure Steel Records.

In addition to Crescent Shield, Sisneros regrouped with Rustrum to form the Megadeth tribute Hangar 18, where she uses the stage name "Mellefson" (an amalgamation of her name and Megadeth bassist David Ellefson). She also plays bass for the all-female AC/DC tribute Whole Lotta Rosies, as well as the all-female Led Zeppelin tribute Mz Led.

Sisneros cites Steve Harris, Cliff Burton, Geddy Lee, Bob Daisley, David Ellefson, Steve Di Giorgio, Markus Grosskopf and John Taylor as her influences.

== Discography ==
=== Raven Mad ===
- Corvus Insanus (1999)
- A Bit of Madness (2000)

=== Crescent Shield ===
- The Last of My Kind
- The Stars of Never Seen
