= Route 666 (The Iron Maidens album) =

Studio album by The Iron Maidens
- Released: May 23, 2007 (Japan)
- Recorded: Office Studios, Van Nuys, CA; Galaxy Theater, Santa Ana, CA (Live recordings)
- Genre: Heavy metal
- Length: 30:09 (CD); 56 minutes (DVD)
- Label: Powerslave Records
- Producer: Bob Kulick and Brett Chassen (CD); Thomas LeBlanc and Mark Dawson (DVD)

The Iron Maidens chronology
World's Only Female Tribute to Iron Maiden (2005)	Route 666 (2007)	The Root of All Evil (2008)

Route 666 is the second album by the all-female tribute band The Iron Maidens and the first under their Japanese label Powerslave Records. It is also the first release featuring guitarist Heather Baker (who replaced Elizabeth Schall and Josephine Soegijanty). (Soegijanty, however, does appear on the DVD portion of this album.) Produced by Bob Kulick and Brett Chassen (who worked on the 2005 Iron Maiden tribute album Numbers from the Beast), Route 666 is a CD/DVD package, with the DVD featuring the band's live performance at the Galaxy Theatre in Santa Ana, CA, on March 12, 2005. Most notable are the guest appearances of Motörhead guitarist Phil Campbell and Iron Maiden keyboardist Michael Kenney.

The cover artwork by Tommy Pons features the band's new mascot Charlotte (named after the Iron Maiden song "Charlotte the Harlot"). Liner notes in the sleeve include commentary by Bob Kulick and Show-Ya vocalist Keiko Terada.

To promote the CD in Japan, the band filmed a music video for "Fear of the Dark", which is featured on their official Japanese website. The video was produced by Oakland, California-based The Pegasus Company. Due to time restrictions on Japanese TV, the song was edited to a running time of five minutes.

As of August 2009, this album is sold out and no longer in print.

== Track listing ==
All songs written by Steve Harris except where indicated.

=== CD ===
1. "Die with Your Boots On" (Bruce Dickinson, Adrian Smith, Harris) - 5:25
2. "Fear of the Dark" - 7:23
3. "The Prisoner" (Smith, Harris) - 6:06
4. "Revelations" (Dickinson) - 6:59
5. "The Trooper" (Live) - 4:16

=== DVD ===
1. "The Ides of March"
2. "Wrathchild"
3. "The Trooper"
4. "Powerslave" (Dickinson)
5. "Wasted Years" (Smith)
6. "Phantom of the Opera"
7. "The Clairvoyant"
8. "Seventh Son of a Seventh Son"
9. "Run to the Hills"
10. End Credits: "Always Look on the Bright Side of Life" (Eric Idle)

== Personnel ==
- Aja Kim (a.k.a. Bruce Lee Chickinson) – lead vocals
- Sara Marsh (a.k.a. Mini Murray) – lead guitar, backing vocals
- Heather Baker (a.k.a. Adrienne Smith) – rhythm guitar (CD only)
- Josephine Soegijanty (a.k.a. Adrienne Smith) - rhythm guitar, backing vocals (DVD only)
- Wanda Ortiz (a.k.a. Steph Harris) – bass, backing vocals (DVD)
- Linda McDonald (a.k.a. Nikki McBurrain) – drums, backing vocals

with

- Phil Campbell - rhythm guitar on "The Trooper" (CD only)
- Michael Kenney - keyboards on "The Clairvoyant" and "Seventh Son of a Seventh Son" (DVD only)

=== Credits ===
- Tommy Pons - cover/sleeve Art
- Linda McDonald - CD sleeve/tray layout
- Ernie Manrique - photography
- Bob Kulick - liner notes commentary
- Keiko Terada - liner notes commentary
