= Heather Baker =

American singer-songwriter

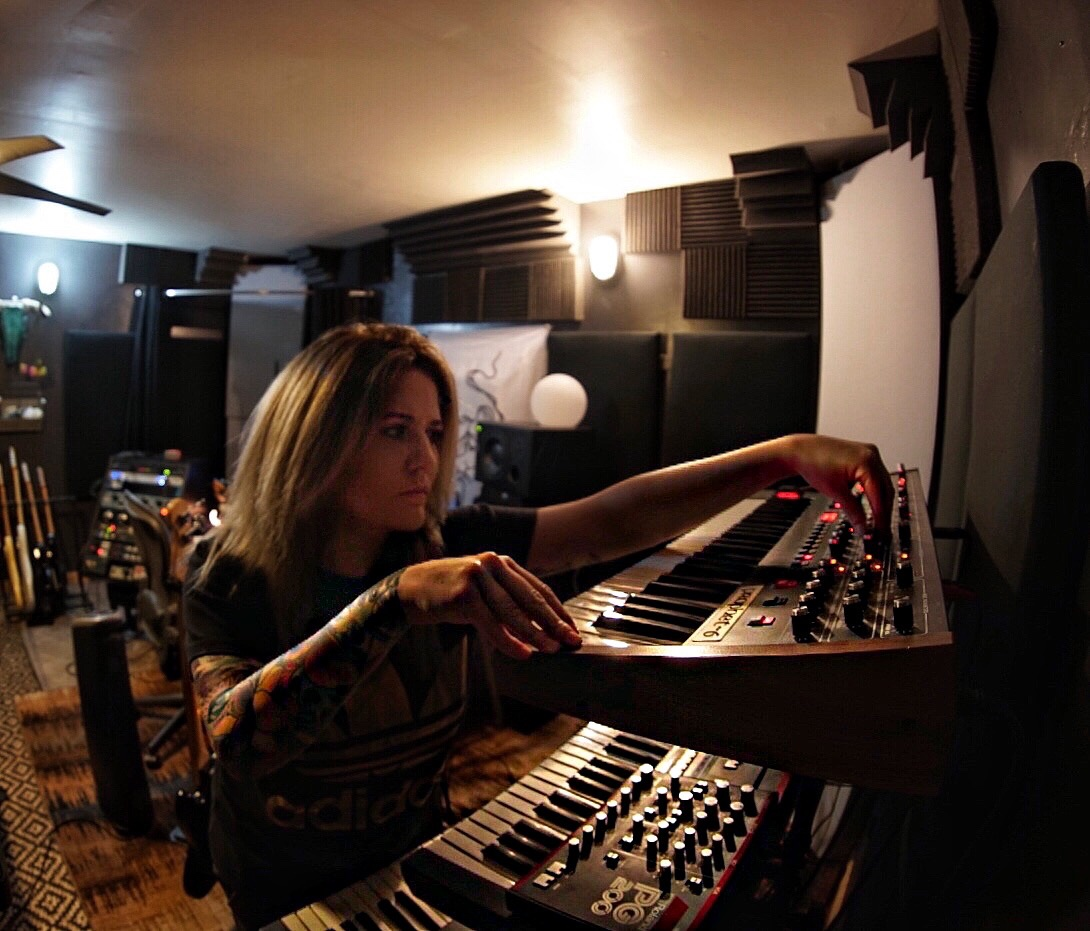
- Baker in 2019

Background information
- Also known as: Heather Liz Baker
- Born: October 9, 1984 (age 41)
- Origin: Yorba Linda, California, U.S.
- Genres: Pop Music; Film Score; Electronica; Heavy Metal; Post Hardcore
- Occupations: Producer, Music Director, Musician, Composer, Songwriter
- Instruments: Guitar; Vocals; Keyboard
- Years active: 2004—Present
- Formerly of: Antiwave; The Iron Maidens; As Night Falls; Fake Figures
- Website: https://heatherlizbaker.com/

Heather Baker (born October 9, 1984) is an American producer, musical director, and guitarist. Her musical direction clients include Chappell Roan, Conan Gray, Olivia Rodrigo, Lainey Wilson, LANY, Towa Bird, Tegan and Sara, Livingston (musician), Ricky Montgomery, Maude Latour, Meg Myers, Em Beihold and Peter McPoland. Baker works under Direction Music Group, a musical direction collective based in Los Angeles, California.

Baker is also known for being a session and touring guitar player for the likes of Olivia Rodrigo, Miley Cyrus, Demi Lovato, Adam Lambert, Bea Miller, Bonnie McKee and more.

== Background ==
In 2004, Heather Baker and a group of friends formed the post hardcore band As Night Falls, releasing their debut EP The End of All Innocence in 2004.

In February 2007, Baker joined The Iron Maidens (world's only female tribute to Iron Maiden). She joined vocalist Aja Kim, guitarist Sara Marsh, bassist Wanda Ortiz and drummer Linda McDonald as part of the Maidens' 2007–2008 lineup. Baker's stage name was "Adrienne Smith," a female version of Iron Maiden guitarist Adrian Smith, until her official departure in 2010.

In 2011, Baker found her way into pop music as a touring guitar player for artists Bonnie Mckee, Krewella and Bea Miller. She also began producing music videos for Panic At The Disco, The Used, Little Dragon, Zoo Brazil and many others under Anthem Films, a commercial and music video production company.

In 2013, Baker began commercial composing and arranging for feature films and television including soundtrack music for Holy Ghost People (2013), Raised by Wolves (2014), A Beginner's Guide To Snuff (2015), Little Paradise (2015), The Night Watchmen (2016), Dead Draw (2016), Cynthia (2017), Embeds (2017 TV series) and Starlight (2019).

In 2021, Direction Music Group was formed by Heather Baker and her partners, Drew Taubenfeld, Max Bernstein, Kevin Cofield, and Asaf Rodeh after years of working and touring together.

== Discography ==
=== As Night Falls ===
- The End of All Innocence (2004)

=== Fake Figures ===
- Hail The Sycophants (2011)
- They Must Be Destroyed (2014)

=== Antiwave ===
- Holiday Heart (2016)
- Agent of Sleep (2017)
