= Jenny Warren =

American singer and songwriter

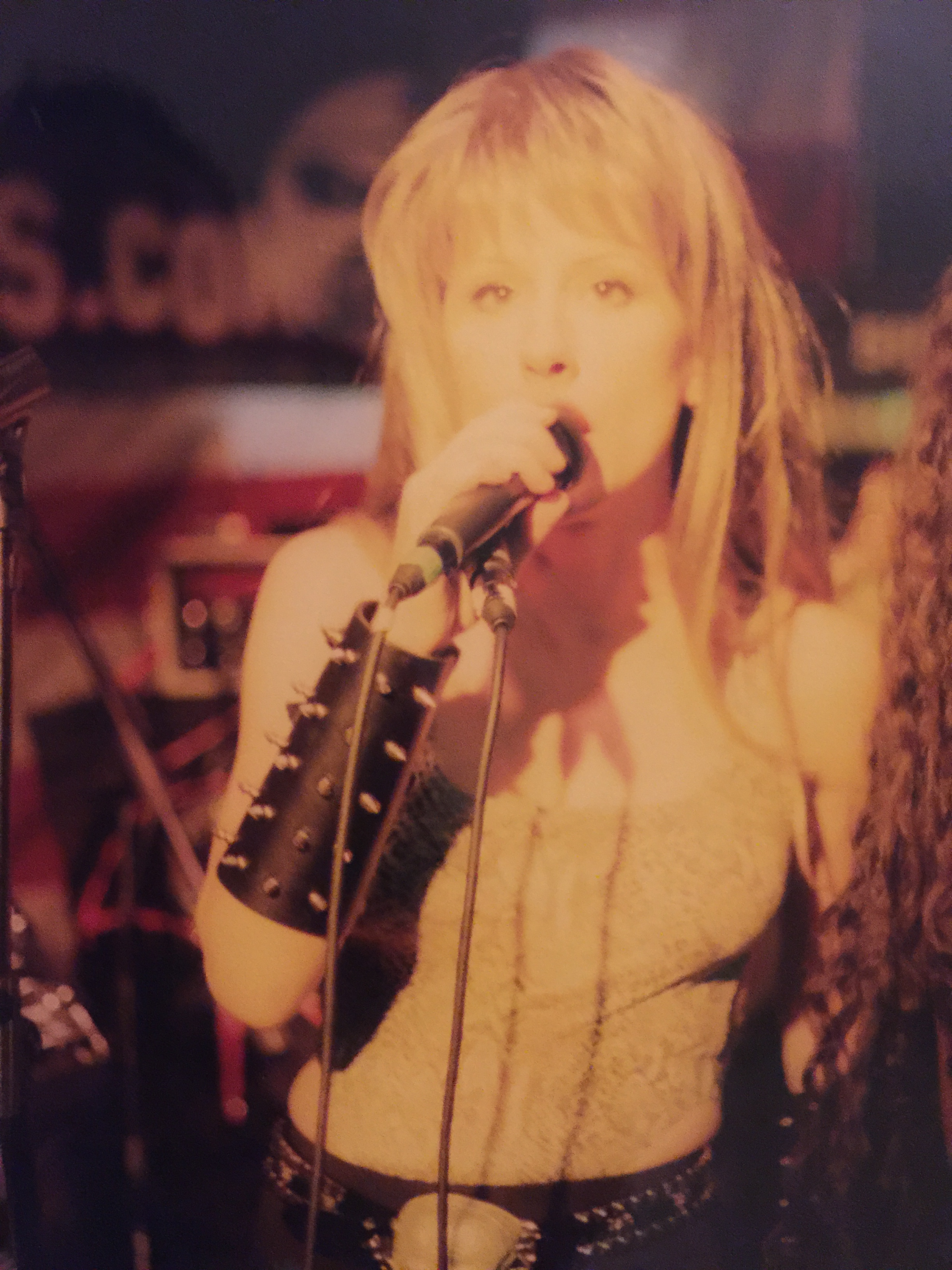
- Jenny Warren in 2002

Background information
- Also known as: Jen Taylor Warren; Bruce Chickinson
- Genres: Heavy metal; tribute
- Occupations: Singer; songwriter; musician
- Formerly of: the Iron Maidens; Whole Lotta Rosies
- Website: fineartamerica.com/profiles/aj-warren.html

Jenny Warren is an American singer, best known as the co-founder of the all-female tribute band the Iron Maidens.

== Biography ==
Jenny Warren first had an Iron Maiden tribute band called Wrathchild. The idea came when she discovered the website of a Chicago-based tribute band called Revelations. Wrathchild started with Warren (using the stage name "Bruce Chickinson") as the only female member, but when bassist Melanie Sisneros (formerly of Raven Mad and New Eden) joined in 2000, Warren decided to give the band a new direction within the next year.

In June 2001, Warren and Sisneros were joined by guitarist Sara Marsh (formerly of Bandit), drummer Linda McDonald and guitarist Josephine Draven (both formerly of Phantom Blue) to form The Iron Maidens ("World's Only Female Tribute to Iron Maiden"). The band found some success while touring across the U.S.

In 2003, the Maidens started work on their first album, but production was halted when Warren left the band. The need to raise an autistic child contributed to her departure, which the band did not make official until early 2004. Later that year, rock/R&B singer/songwriter Aja Kim was announced as Warren's successor by the Maidens.

Shortly after leaving the Maidens, Warren regrouped Wrathchild with Sisneros (who left the Maidens in late 2002) for a one-off performance at MetalJam, a fund-raising event to promote autism awareness and raise funds for charities to find a cure for autism. She also played bass for the all-female AC/DC tribute band Whole Lotta Rosies for a short period of time.

Warren's original abstract acrylic painting “dive in,” was selected for inclusion in the American Institute of Architects (AIA) Orange County's 4TH Annual Art Walk, a juried event, hosted by Room & Board, at South Coast Plaza Village in Southern California in 2013.

Recently she sang for NEIGHBORHOOD X:Orange County's Hottest Thrash Pop Band and currently she is the lead vocalist in Subsurface Tension (Formerly Surface Tension) based in the LA/OC area.

== Early life and education ==
She began studying art and music as a child and has experience as a performance artist 'flying' five stories above crowds while in a flight harness designed by Peter Foy (Flybyfoy.com). In her youth, she also performed as a lead vocalist on stage in cities across the U.S. and appeared at the world-famous Los Angeles Memorial Coliseum, House of Blues, The Galaxy Theatre and more. She has opened for Danzig, Snoop Dogg, Cypress Hill, The B52s, and more. She has a BA in Theatre Arts and an MBA in Marketing from Florida Tech. At Long Beach State and Cal State Fullerton she studied drawing, oil painting, acrylic painting, graphic design and large-scale theatrical set painting, as well as design for lighting and make-up. Additionally she studied film/video production, editing, and photography.

== Media ==
Featured or mentioned in, Guitar World, The Los Angeles Times, L.A. Weekly, OC Weekly, Orange County Register, San Diego City Beat, A “mention” in Playboy, Chicago Local Live Magazine, Portland Tribune, Tacoma Weekly, Salt Lake City Weekly, Las Vegas City Life, Blender, The National Enquirer, FHM, Maxim, ABC's Livin’ Large TV Show, 54321 on Fox Sports West Network in Tempe, Fine Art America, and MTV Music Awards collector's edition coffee table book. She has a bit part in the feature film, Unbeatable Harold, playing the role of Dylan McDermott's lead guitarist.

== Personal life ==
Warren was married to Bill Warren, formerly the front-man of the Metallica tribute band Creeping Death and front-man/bassist of original industrial metal band Uprooted. They have two children.
