= Howard Rosenberg =

American television critic

- Born: Howard Anthony Rosenberg; June 10, 1938 (age 88) (Note: In a 2008 interview with the Archive of American Television, Rosenberg says he was born on June 10, 1938. Additionally, a 2003 article from the Los Angeles Times announcing his retirement gives his age as 65, which would match a 1938 birth year. However, at least one source – a 2002 collection of biographies on Pulitzer Prize winners – gives Rosenberg's birth date as June 10, 1942.); Kansas City, Missouri, U.S.
- Education: University of Oklahoma (BA); University of Minnesota (MA)
- Occupation: Television critic
- Spouse: Carol
- Children: Kirsten
- Awards: Pulitzer Prize for Criticism (1985)

Howard Anthony Rosenberg (born June 10, 1938) is an American television critic, author, and educator. He worked at The Louisville Times from 1968 through 1978 and then worked at the Los Angeles Times from 1978 to 2003, where he won a Pulitzer Prize for Criticism. Rosenberg coined the term mixed martial arts, or MMA, in his review of the first Ultimate Fighting Championship event UFC 1 in Los Angeles Times on November 15, 1993.

== Personal life ==
Howard Rosenberg was born in Kansas City, Missouri. He earned a bachelor's degree in history from the University of Oklahoma and a master's degree in political science from the University of Minnesota.

Rosenberg's daughter, Kirsten Rosenberg, co-owned a vegan bakery in Washington, D.C., called Sticky Fingers and is currently the lead singer of the all-female tribute band The Iron Maidens.

== Career ==
Rosenberg began his journalism career in Minnesota in 1965. In 1966, he became a reporter for The Dispatch of Moline, Illinois, before joining the Louisville Times in 1968. He was named its television critic in 1970, and moved to the Los Angeles Times in 1978. He won the Pulitzer Prize for Criticism in 1985. In 2008, he wrote monthly columns for Broadcasting & Cable and the Los Angeles Times.

Rosenberg drew some controversy in a column soon after the September 11 attacks, in which he said that George W. Bush appeared "stiff and boyish." This led to requests for him to be fired and he stated that he received letters calling him "Osama bin Rosenberg" due to the controversy.

In 1991, Rosenberg became an adjunct professor at the University of Southern California. In 2012, he taught classes on news ethics at the Annenberg School for Communication and Journalism and on television at the School of Cinematic Arts.

After retiring, he co-authored the 2008 book No Time to Think with Charles S. Feldman and compiled an anthology of his works, Not So Prime Time. Rosenberg was a member of the Peabody Awards Board of Jurors from 1996 to 2003. He has also written mystery novels.

== Bibliography ==
- Not So Prime Time: Chasing the Trivial on American Television. Ivan R. Dee. 2005. ISBN 978-1566636711.
- Rosenberg, Howard; Feldman, Charles S. (2008). No Time to Think: The Menace of Media Speed and the 24-Hour News Cycle. Continuum International Publishing Group. ISBN 978-1441112354.
- Up Yours!. Self-published. 2013. ISBN 978-1490550961.
- Blizzard of Lies. Self-published. 2020. ISBN 979-8675407262.
- Killing Elvis. Self-published. 2024. ISBN 979-8329835403.
