= Metal Gathering Tour Live in Japan 2010 =

- Catalog No. YZXL-8001

Video by The Iron Maidens
- Released: August 25, 2010
- Recorded: January 25, 2010 to January 31, 2010
- Genre: Heavy metal
- Label: Powerslave
- Producer: The Iron Maidens and Mark Dawson

The Iron Maidens chronology
The Root of All Evil (2008)	Metal Gathering Tour Live in Japan 2010 (2010)

Metal Gathering Tour Live in Japan 2010 is a Japan-only live video by the all-female tribute band The Iron Maidens. Recorded live during their tour in Japan in January 2010, it was the band's first release with new lead vocalist Kirsten Rosenberg and new guitarist Courtney Cox, and also the last to feature guitarist Sara Marsh, who was released from the band after this tour.

== Track listing ==
All songs written by Steve Harris except where indicated.

=== Disc 1 ===
1. Opening
2. "Invaders"
3. "Die With Your Boots On" (Bruce Dickinson, Adrian Smith, Harris)
4. "The Trooper"
5. "Flight of Icarus" (Dickinson, Smith)
6. "Revelations" (Dickinson)
7. "Killers" (Paul Di'Anno, Harris)
8. "Wasted Years" (Smith)
9. "Alexander the Great"
10. "Losfer Words (Big 'Orra)"
11. "The Number of the Beast"
12. "The Wicker Man" (Dickinson, Smith, Harris)
13. "The Evil That Men Do" (Dickinson, Smith, Harris)
14. "Hallowed Be Thy Name"
15. Mini Murray's Shamisen
16. "The Prisoner" (Smith, Harris)
17. "22 Acacia Avenue" (Smith, Harris)
18. "Phantom of the Opera"
19. "Run to the Hills"
20. Ending

=== Disc 2 ===
1. "Wasted Years" (Encore song at Holiday Osaka)(Smith)
2. "Moonchild" (Encore song at Holiday Nagoya) (Dickinson, Smith)
3. Interview
4. Tomei Highway (Behind the Scenes of Tour)

== Personnel ==
- Kirsten Rosenberg (a.k.a. Bruce Chickinson) - vocals
- Courtney Cox (a.k.a. Adriana Smith) - guitars
- Sara Marsh (a.k.a. Mini Murray) - guitars
- Wanda Ortiz (a.k.a. Steph Harris) - bass
- Linda McDonald (a.k.a. Nikki McBurrain) - drums
