= Linda McDonald =

American drummer

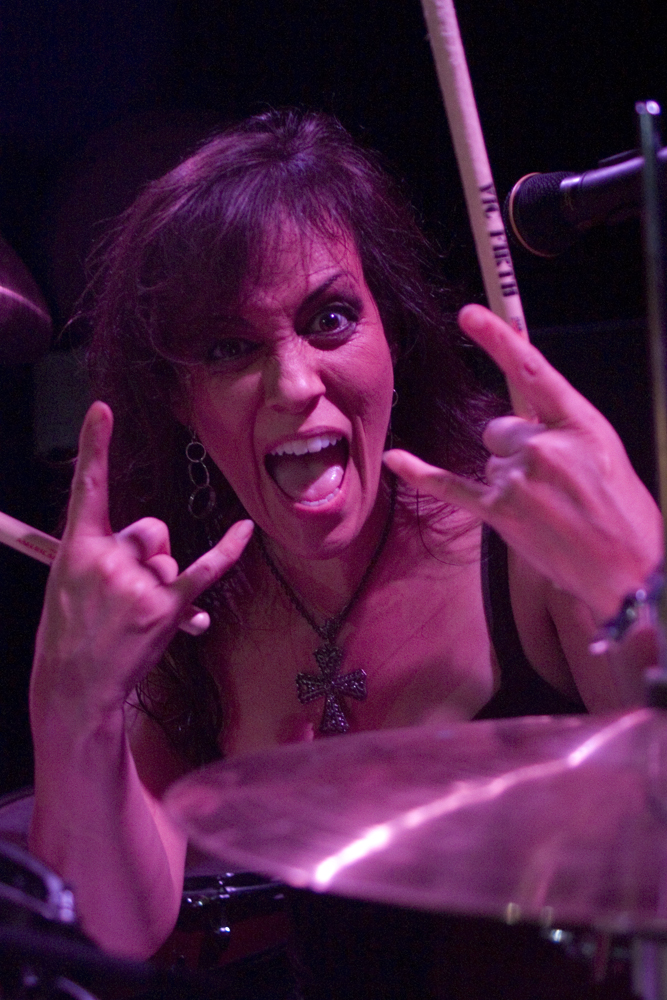
- McDonald in 2006

Background information
- Also known as: Nikki McBurrain (The Iron Maidens); Brandy Castillo (The Little Dolls)
- Born: Linda Ann McDonald; September 7, 1969 (age 56); Great Falls, Montana, United States
- Genres: Heavy metal, hard rock, tribute
- Occupation: Drummer
- Years active: 1987—present
- Labels: DRZ, Powerslave, Geffen, Roadrunner, Shrapnel

Linda Ann McDonald (born September 7, 1969) is an American musician best known as the drummer of the all-female tribute band The Iron Maidens (billed as the "World's Only Female Tribute to Iron Maiden"). In addition, she was a member of the Ozzy Osbourne tribute band The Little Dolls (billed as "All Female, All Ozzy, All The Time...Covering All Eras Of Ozzy") and the cover bands Valley Dolls, Crabby Patty (I'm So Unclear!) and Unholy Pink. Prior to those works, McDonald was the drummer/co-founder of the all-female heavy metal band Phantom Blue from its inception in 1987 to its demise in 2001.

== Biography ==
Of Irish and Japanese descent, Linda McDonald was inspired to take up instruments after listening to her brother's copy of Iron Maiden's Maiden Japan live EP. While she took up piano, guitar and violin, her self-taught drumming skills stood out the most. She attended Summer Session at the Musician's Institute in Hollywood after graduating high school, followed by some courses in drum set, harmony and theory and ear training at the Dick Grove School of Music in the San Fernando Valley.

Following a short stint with a three-piece female band called Andromeda, McDonald became a founding member of Phantom Blue. And while the band found some success with their self-titled debut album in 1989 and their second release, "Built to Perform" on Geffen Records in 1993, produced by the legendary Max Norman. Their last recording was the EP Full Blown (1998) before they went their separate ways in 2001.

Shortly after Phantom Blue's demise, McDonald-along with bandmate Josephine Soegijanty and ex-Bandit member Sara Marsh – joined vocalist Jenny Warren and bassist Melanie Sisneros to form The Iron Maidens, an all-female tribute band to Iron Maiden. McDonald has remained the original band member since then.

As a member of The Iron Maidens, McDonald's stage name is "Nikki McBurrain," an amalgamation of Iron Maiden's former drummer Clive Burr and their current drummer Nicko McBrain. And much like McBrain with his drum kit, McDonald has hers decorated with a Sooty puppet.

McDonald's favorite Iron Maiden songs are "Rime of the Ancient Mariner", "Children of the Damned" and "The Prisoner"

In addition to The Iron Maidens, McDonald was a member of various cover bands Crabby Patty (I'm So Unclear!), Unholy Pink, Valley Dolls and a female Ozzy Osbourne tribute called The Little Dolls and recorded with and did several dates with former Phantom Blue member Michelle Meldrum's band called Meldrum.

McDonald, along with Maidens bandmate Courtney Cox, joined former Phantom Blue members Kim Nielsen-Parsons, Gigi Hangach and Tina Wood for a reunion at a benefit concert on May 26, 2009, at the Whisky a Go Go in Hollywood, California. The concert was for the benefit of brain research in memory of Phantom Blue co-founder Michelle Meldrum, who died of a cystic growth in her brain on May 21, 2008.

Aside from Clive Burr and Nicko McBrain, McDonald also cites Simon Phillips, John Bonham, Alex Van Halen and Phil Collins among her influences. Her musical preferences vary from Barry Manilow to System of a Down.

An avid pet lover, McDonald has a dog, a cat and a parakeet in her home.

== Discography ==
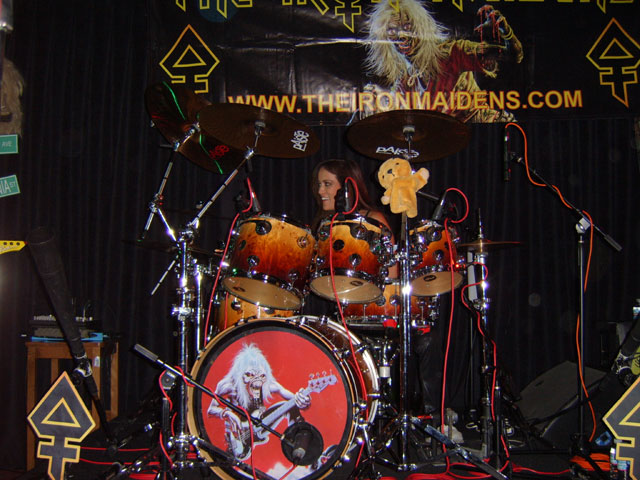
McDonald on drums with The Iron Maidens

=== Phantom Blue ===
- Phantom Blue (1989)
- My Misery (single, 1993)
- Built to Perform (1993)
- Prime Cuts & Glazed Donuts (1995)
- Caught Live! (1997)
- Full Blown (1998)

=== The Iron Maidens ===
- World's Only Female Tribute to Iron Maiden (2005/2006)
- Route 666 (2007)
- The Root of All Evil (2008)
- Metal Gathering Tour Live in Japan 2010 (video, 2010)

=== The Little Dolls ===
- Girls Got Rhythm! (Various artists) (2006)
  - "I Don't Know"

=== Collaborations ===
- Warmth in The Wilderness (Tribute to Jason Becker)
- Transmission (Carina Alfie)
- Electric Fuzz (Carina Alfie)
- Blowin' Up the Machine (Meldrum)

== Equipment endorsers ==
Linda McDonald currently endorses Paiste cymbals; Vic Firth drum sticks; Drum Workshop drums, pedals and hardware; Humes And Berg drum cases; Aquarian Drum Heads; NoNuts cymbal sleeves. In the past, she used Tama drums while touring with Phantom Blue.

== Media ==
McDonald has been featured in The Los Angeles Times, Guitar World, Metal Edge, Modern Drummer, DRUM! Magazine, Kerrang, Rip, Aardshock, Metal Hammer, L.A. Weekly, L.A. New Times, OC Weekly, Chicago Local Live Magazine, Portland Tribune, Playboy, Hustler, Orange County Register, The National Enquirer, FHM, Maxim, two MTV videos, ABC's Livin' Large TV Show, 54321 on Fox Sports Net, two Hard N' Heavy video magazine episodes, Gibson Lifestyle, KCAL-TV's 9 on the Town, and The Tonight Show with Jay Leno.
