= The Root of All Evil (EP) =

EP by The Iron Maidens
- Released: April 23, 2008 (Japan)
- Studio: NRG Studios, North Hollywood, CA
- Genre: Heavy metal Eurobeat
- Length: 17:33
- Label: Powerslave Records
- Producer: The Iron Maidens and Mark Dawson

The Iron Maidens chronology
Route 666 (2007)	The Root of All Evil (2008)	Metal Gathering Tour Live in Japan 2010 (2010)

The Root of All Evil is a Japan-only EP release by the all-female tribute band The Iron Maidens. It includes three new cover recordings of Iron Maiden songs and a dance remix of "The Trooper." This was the band's last recording to feature lead vocalist Aja Kim and guitarists Sara Marsh and Heather Baker, who left the band.

Unlike their previous albums, the EP is not offered on the band's official website.

Prior to the release of the EP, the band first performed the acoustic version of "Different World" on the Los Angeles, CA, radio station 97.1 KLSX in late 2007.

== Track listing ==
1. "Transylvania" (Steve Harris) - 4:21
2. "The Evil That Men Do" (Bruce Dickinson, Adrian Smith, Harris) - 4:29
3. "Different World" (Acoustic Version) (Smith, Harris) - 4:02
4. "The Trooper" (Dance Remix) (Harris) - 4:41
  - Remixed by Glenn Baren and Lynn Woolever

== Personnel ==
- Aja Kim (a.k.a. Bruce Lee Chickinson) – lead vocals
- Sara Marsh (a.k.a. Mini Murray) – guitars, acoustic guitar (track 3)
- Heather Baker (a.k.a. Adrienne Smith) – guitars, acoustic guitar (track 3), backing vocals
- Wanda Ortiz (a.k.a. Steph Harris) – bass
- Linda McDonald (a.k.a. Nikki McBurrain) – drums

=== Credits ===
- Derek Riggs - CD cover design
- Linda McDonald - CD sleeve/tray layout, CD cover design
- Ernie Manrique - photography
- RJ Blaze - back tray artwork ("Evil Root Edwina")
