= Full Blown (Phantom Blue album) =

Extended play by Phantom Blue

EP by Phantom Blue
- Released: 1998
- Genre: Heavy metal
- Length: 19:53
- Label: DRZ Records

Phantom Blue chronology
Caught Live! (1997)	Full Blown (1998)

Full Blown is an EP release by US all-female heavy metal band Phantom Blue. Following the release of the live album Caught Live!, lead vocalist Gigi Hangach departed from the band, leaving drummer Linda McDonald as the sole founding member.

Shortly after the EP's release, the members of Phantom Blue went their separate ways. Lead vocalist Lucienne Thomas became the frontwoman of the Heart tribute band Dreamboat Annie. Guitarist Tina Wood joined former bandmate Dyna Shirasaki to form the all-female AC/DC tribute band ThundHerStruck. Linda McDonald and guitarist Josephine Soegijanty co-founded The Iron Maidens ("World's Only Female Tribute to Iron Maiden") with guitarist Sara Marsh (formerly of Bandit), bassist Melanie Sisneros (formerly of New Eden) and vocalist Jenny Warren (formerly of Prozact Princess). McDonald, Soegijanty and Marsh also reformed Phantom Blue in 2001 with lead vocalist Jeannine St. Clair and bassist Amy Tung, but the lineup was short-lived.

== Track listing ==
1. "I'm So Happy" – 4:20
2. "Cookie" – 3:23
3. "My Turn" – 4:28
4. "Chance on You" – 3:21
5. "Turnaround" – 4:21

== Personnel ==
Phantom Blue

- Lucienne Thomas – vocals
- Josephine Soegijanty – guitar
- Tina Wood – guitar
- Mary Jo Godges – bass guitar
- Linda McDonald – drums
