= Full Blown =

Full Blown may refer to:

- Full Blown (Lil Italy album), 2001
- Full Blown (Phantom Blue album), 2000
