= Elizabeth Schall =

American singer

- Born: Elizabeth Schall
- Genres: Death metal Heavy Metal; Tribute
- Occupations: Musician, songwriter, accountant
- Instruments: Guitar, vocals, accordion, piano
- Years active: 2003–present
- Labels: Ibex Moon Records; Powerslave Records
- Website: www.myspace.com/dreamingdead

Elizabeth Schall is a female American singer, songwriter and guitarist, and founder of the death metal band Dreaming Dead and grindcore band Cretin. Prior to that, she was a guitarist of the all-female tribute band The Iron Maidens and the death metal band Winterthrall. She is married to fellow death metal musician Leon del Muerte.

== Biography ==
Of Chilean descent, Elizabeth Schall first came into the music scene when she was recruited to join the death metal band Winterthrall in 2003. She departed from the band two years later.

Schall joined The Iron Maidens in September 2005 following the departure of guitarist/co-founder Josephine Draven, taking the stage name of "Adrianne Smith" (a female version of Adrian Smith).

Shortly before she left from the Maidens in October 2006, Schall formed the death metal band Manslaughter with drummer Mike Caffell. They recorded one EP before recruiting guitarist Manuel Villareal and bassist William Toledo. Following a brief tour, Villareal and Toledo left the band. Once again as a duo, Schall and Caffell recorded their first album Within One, then renamed the band Dreaming Dead and recruited bassist Juan Ramirez.

On September 30, 2008, Ibex Moon Records announced they have signed a record deal with Dreaming Dead. Within One was released on CD on January 20, 2009. As the band focused on writing and performing as a trio of Schall, Caffell and Ramirez.

Schall rejoined the Maidens in June 2010 in a guest appearance as "Deena Murray".

Schall cites Peter Tägtgren and Jeff Loomis among her influences, as well as Cryptopsy, Metallica, Megadeth and Slayer.

== Discography ==
=== Dreaming Dead ===
•Funeral Twilight (2018)

- Midnightmares (2012)
- Within One (2009)

=== Cretin ===
- Stranger (2014)

=== Manslaughter ===
- Through the Eyes of Insanity (EP, 2006)

=== Winterthrall ===
- Nightmares for the Sleepless (2006).

=== The Iron Maidens ===
- World's Only Female Tribute to Iron Maiden (2006)
  - Pictured on the Japanese release version, despite the fact that the guitar work was done by her predecessor Josephine Soegijanty.
