= No Time to Think =

2008 book by Howard Rosenberg

- First edition
- Author: Howard Rosenberg, Charles S. Feldman
- Publisher: Bloomsbury Publishing
- Publication date: 2008

No Time to Think: The Menace of Media Speed and the 24-Hour News Cycle is a book by Howard Rosenberg and Charles S. Feldman, published in 2008.

The book critiques the speed of the media in our days, where the emphasis is usually placed on being the first to report a story. This sometimes causes lesser events to become first-page news.

== Reception ==
Charlie Courtauld, a reviewer for The Independent says, "the authors really do have a point. But I think they've got it the wrong way round. Yes, the trivial is often overhyped. But worse mistakes are made when the momentous is treated as trivial."

"Compelling and insightful...any reader who wants to understand how news outlets such as CNN are run might appreciate a behind-the-scenes glimpse from a longtime insider." Dinesh Ramdem

"Howard Rosenberg and Charles Feldman capture both the serious dangers and the intense competitive pressures of today's 24 hour news cycle. The traditional policy of "getting it right" often has been replaced by the urgency of "getting it first." Today's news culture rewards those who achieve both speed and accuracy. It awards no praise for second place or reporting inaccurately. Howard and Charles witnessed firsthand the accelerating speed and the decelerating standards in two of the finest news organizations in the nation, Los Angeles Times and CNN. Their book is a very provocative read." Tom Johnson

"In No Time to Think, Howard Rosenberg and Charles Feldman take a refreshing pause to contemplate today's superheated media environment and the implications of 'Shoot first, think later' news. The book deftly captures this relatively new dynamic and its depressing implications for journalism and democracy -- and should be required reading for anyone who cares about either. Breezily written, it's a sobering reminder of the often-overlooked price tag associated with headlong technological advancement." Brian Lowry.

== See also ==
- 24-hour news cycle
