= Jojo Draven =

- Also known as: Josephine Adrianne Smith (The Iron Maidens)
- Born: Josephine Soegijanty
- Origin: Java, Indonesia
- Genres: Film score Heavy Metal; Hard rock Tribute
- Occupation: Musician
- Instruments: Guitar, keyboard
- Labels: DRZ Records; Powerslave Records
- Website: jojodraven.com

Jojo Draven is an Indonesian-born American musician and film score composer. She was a cast member of the Blue Man Group. She has worked as sole touring musician with illusionist Criss Angel. She was also the guitarist for the Shrapnel Records/Geffen Records recording artist all-female heavy metal band Phantom Blue and was the co-founder and original member of the all-female tribute band The Iron Maidens.

== Biography ==
Born in Java, Indonesia, Jojo Draven started her music career as a keyboardist for several rock bands in the country. She learned to play guitar in her last year of Senior High School, after being told that she was too old to start learning a new instrument. Shortly afterward, she joined an all-female rock band as the guitarist and main songwriter and found some success touring and recording with the band before relocating to the U.S. where she studied at the Musicians Institute in Hollywood, Los Angeles, California. There, she became the protégé of Alex Skolnick, guitarist of the heavy metal band Testament.

In 1996, Draven joined the all-female band Phantom Blue as their main guitarist. She remained with the band until its demise in late 2001. On June of that same year, she and drummer Linda McDonald joined vocalist Jenny Warren, bassist Melanie Sisneros and guitarist Sara Marsh (formerly of Bandit) to form the tribute band The Iron Maidens ("World's Only Female Tribute to Iron Maiden"). Her stage name in the Maidens was "Adrianne Smith," a female version of Iron Maiden guitarist Adrian Smith. Draven's tenure in both Phantom Blue and the Maidens earned her three Los Angeles Rock City Awards for Best Female Guitarist.

Shortly after the release of the band's self-titled debut album in 2005, Draven left the Maidens to pursue a career in composing film scores – many of which have been produced and/or directed by her husband, Danny Draven.

She was featured in the album Warmth in the Wilderness, a tribute album to pay homage to Jason Becker, appearing in the album alongside Marty Friedman, Paul Gilbert and Vinnie Moore.

In 2001, she recorded "Baby's on Fire" featuring Ralph Saenz (lead singer for Steel Panther) on vocals, Ray Luzier (drummer for Korn and David Lee Roth Band) on drums, Tip Petersen on bass, and Jojo Draven on guitar.

In April 2011, through an audition process Draven was hired as guitarist for the Blue Man Group in Las Vegas, Nevada, beating many other male candidates.

In March 2015, illusionist Criss Angel came to a Blue Man Group show and upon seeing Draven on stage told her that he wanted her to play for his touring show. By April 2015, he hired Draven and she went on a residency tour with his Supernaturalists show.

=== Career as film score composer ===
In 2001, Draven composed her first film score for the motion picture Hell Asylum. Since then, she has gone to score other independent films such as Patient Seven starring Hollywood's favorite bad guy Michael Ironside.

In 2016, she joined other accomplished female composers in a Los Angeles showcase honoring long-time composer Deborah Lurie, in which Hollywood director Joss Whedon was in attendance and promoted the ladies.

In 2018, she obtained a four-picture deal with Candybar Entertainment, a family entertainment production company, breaking her away from the horror genre.

In 2020, she was tapped by legendary producer-director Charles Band of the Full Moon Pictures fame to score his latest of the Barbie & Kendra series.

In 2025, she scored a Lionsgate motion picture starring Dermot Mulroney, Vivica A. Fox and Mayim Bialik, called Like Father, Like Son, which received a limited theatrical release.

In April 2025, she gained notoriety in scoring an RLJE film called Neighborhood Watch (2025) starring Jack Quaid and Jeffrey Dean Morgan. The Hollywood publication Variety (magazine) calls her score "effective in adding discreet notes of bemusement and peril" in its review for the film.

== Discography ==
=== Phantom Blue ===
- Caught Live (1997)
- Full Blown (1998)

=== The Iron Maidens ===
- World's Only Female Tribute to Iron Maiden (2005/2006)
- Girls Got Rhythm! (Compilation) (2006)
  - "Run to the Hills"
- Route 666 (2007)
  - Appears on the live DVD portion.

=== Collaborations ===
- Warmth in The Wilderness (Tribute to Jason Becker)
- Gitar Klinik 2 (Various artists)

== Filmography ==
- Hell Asylum (2001)
- Cryptz (2002)
- Darkwalker (2003)
- Ring of Darkness (2004)
- Witches of the Caribbean (2005)
- Ghost Month (2008)
- The Invisible Chronicles (2009)
- Reel Evil (2012)
- Patient Seven (2016)
- The Three Bears and the Perfect Gift (2018)
- Weedjies: Halloweed Night (2019)
- Barbie & Kendra Save the Tiger King (2020)
- Barbie & Kendra Storm Area 51 (2021)
- Bad CGI Gator (2023)
- Restitution (2024)
- The Naughty List of Mr. Scrooge (2024)
- Like Father, Like Son (2025)
- Neighborhood Watch (2025)
