= Caught Live! =

Live album by Phantom Blue
- Released: 1997
- Genre: Heavy metal
- Length: 39:20
- Label: DRZ Records
- Producers: Chris Jacobson, Phantom Blue, Mark Dawson

Phantom Blue chronology
Prime Cuts & Glazed Donuts (1995)	Caught Live! (1997)	Full Blown (2000)

Professional ratings
Review scores
Source	Rating
Scream Magazine	1/6

Caught Live! is a live album by American all-female heavy metal band Phantom Blue.

The set list consists mainly of songs from Built to Perform and Prime Cuts & Glazed Donuts. "Going Mad" is the only song from the band's self-titled debut album on the list. Also included is a cover of the Janis Joplin song "Move Over" and the previously unreleased song "Bleeding from Nowhere".

== Track listing ==
1. "Introduction" - 0:40
2. "Anti-Love Crunch" (Linda McDonald, Karen Kreutzer, Gigi Hangach) - 3:03
3. "Bad Reputation" (Brian Downey, Phil Lynott, Scott Gorham) - 2:49 (Thin Lizzy cover)
4. "Little Man" , Nicole Couch) - 3:31
5. "Strange War" (, Michelle Meldrum, Couch) - 4:01
6. "In the Likes of You" (McDonald, Chris Haren) - 3:16
7. "Move Over" (Janis Joplin) - 3:58 (Janis Joplin cover)
8. "Satu Saju" (Jojo's Solo) - 2:29
9. "Bleeding from Nowhere" (McDonald, Kreutzer, Hangach) - 3:56
10. "Fairies Wear Boots" (Tony Iommi, Ozzy Osbourne, Geezer Butler, Bill Ward) - 4:54 (Black Sabbath cover)
11. "Violin Song" (instrumental) - 2:04
12. "Going Mad" (Couch) - 4:11
13. "Gigi's Bogus Bonus Track" - 0:28

== Personnel ==
Phantom Blue

- Gigi Hangach – vocals
- Josephine Soegijanty – guitar
- Tina Wood – guitar
- Dyna Shirisaki - bass guitar
- Linda McDonald – drums

Additional musicians

- Candace Mokhtarian - violin on "Violin Song"

Production

- Chris Jacobson - producer, engineer
- Eric Fahlborg - mastering
- Mark Dawson - executive producer
