= Neighborhood Watch (film) =

2025 crime thriller film

- Release poster
- Directed by: Duncan Skiles
- Written by: Sean Farley
- Produced by: Chris Bellant; Luke Daniels; Kurt Fethke; Vince Jolivette; Jake Robinson
- Starring: Jeffrey Dean Morgan; Jack Quaid; Cecile Cubiló; Jim Klock; Malin Akerman
- Cinematography: Luke McCoubrey
- Edited by: Cody Joel
- Music by: Jojo Draven
- Production companies: Redwire Pictures; Filmopoly; Lane E Productions; Pollywog Films; Torchlight Productions
- Distributed by: RLJE Films
- Release date: April 25, 2025
- Running time: 93 minutes
- Country: United States
- Language: English
- Box office: $35,370

Neighborhood Watch is a 2025 American crime thriller film written by Sean Farley and directed by Duncan Skiles, starring Jeffrey Dean Morgan, Jack Quaid, Cecile Cubiló, Jim Klock, and Malin Akerman. The story follows Simon (Quaid), a mentally ill young man, who thinks he witnessed a woman being abducted, but the police don't believe him. He gets his neighbor Ed (Morgan), a retired security guard, to help him search for the missing woman.

The film was released on video on demand and in theaters on April 25, 2025, by RLJE Films.

== Plot ==
In Homewood, Alabama, Simon McNally, a man with paranoid schizophrenia, experiences vivid hallucinations and is tormented by the disembodied voice of his abusive, deceased father, who continually degrades and belittles him. Recently released from a mental hospital after nearly a decade, Simon struggles to function in daily life, leaving his older sister, DeeDee, to shoulder the financial burden of supporting them both.

One day, Simon witnesses a young woman being assaulted and forced into a van by a man whose face appears blurred to him. His father's voice insists he is hallucinating and too weak to help, but Simon becomes fixated on rescuing her. He reports the incident to local police detective Liz Glover, who checks the van's license plate and finds it registered to a car located hundreds of miles away. Recognizing Simon from previous violent episodes linked to his illness, she dismisses his claim as a delusion.

Desperate, Simon turns to his neighbor Ed Deerman, a reluctantly retired campus security guard. Though skeptical of Simon's story, Ed agrees to help, suspecting Simon may have misread the license plate. At the Department of Motor Vehicles, Ed tries to persuade staff to disclose plate records, but Simon becomes overwhelmed and has a violent outburst when they refuse. They retreat to Ed's car, where he unintentionally calms Simon by repeatedly clicking his pen. Based on Simon's description of the woman's outfit, Ed questions local sex workers, but the encounter ends with his car being smashed by their pimp. Frustrated, Ed admits he never believed Simon's story. Simon leaves to continue the search alone, but Ed ultimately takes pity on him and rejoins the effort.

Ed blackmails his replacement at campus security into obtaining plate records from a traffic officer friend. They visit several addresses until tracing the vehicle to Kurt's Auto Salvage, where they find the car with its plates removed, confirming the van was using stolen tags. Suddenly, Simon hears a scream and rushes toward a nearby car, believing the woman is inside. Ed stops him, insisting there was no scream.

That night, Simon argues with DeeDee, expressing resentment over her leaving him alone with their father. Meanwhile, Ed is attacked at home by the abductor. Simon witnesses the assault and rushes to intervene. Together they disarm the man, and Simon accidentally shoots him dead. They take the man's phone, which contains only two contacts, one belonging to Kurt, and go to DeeDee's workplace so she can treat Ed's wounds. Officers soon arrive, searching for them following the shooting, but Simon and Ed escape by bus.

The next day, the pair confront Kurt. Simon notices that a wall clock conceals a safe, just like Ed's at home, inside which they find several women's passports, including one belonging to Anya, the missing woman. Kurt confesses that the abductor was a sex trafficker and that Anya was being punished for attempting to escape. After Kurt provides the abductor's address, they call the police on him, leaving the passports behind for Glover to find.

At the address, Simon suffers another breakdown as a hallucination of his father taunts him that he will fail. Ed comforts and calms him using the clicking pen, then gives it to Simon to keep. They break into the house and find it seemingly empty—until the abductor's mother appears and flees. Realizing there must be a hidden room, they discover a concealed door and find Anya inside.

Police arrive, take Anya to safety, and arrest Ed and Simon, whom Glover quietly congratulates. Simon and Ed exchange a smile while maintaining eye contact, something Simon had previously been unable to do.

== Cast ==
- Jack Quaid as Simon McNally
- Jeffrey Dean Morgan as Ed Deerman, a retired security guard
- Cecile Cubiló as Detective Liz Glover
- Jim Klock as Jeremy
- Malin Akerman as DeeDee McNally, Simon's older sister
- Harrison Stone as Officer Banks
- Billy Culbertson as Walsh
- Griffin Hood as Kurt
- Creek Wilson as Mr. Allen

== Reception ==
On the review aggregator website Rotten Tomatoes, 71% of 35 critics' reviews are positive, with an average rating of 6.4/10. Metacritic, which uses a weighted average, assigned the film a score of 74 out of 100, based on six critics, indicating "generally favorable" reviews.

Dennis Harvey of Variety wrote, "There's no great effort at building tension, or orchestrating major setpieces. But the narrative moves along at an engaging clip, and there's a pleasing emotional payoff to the way things ultimately come together in Farley's screenplay."

Jason Delgado of Film Threat gave the film a score of 8 out of 10, writing, "There's a certain comfort in a movie delivering what you expect out of it. If you're intrigued by watching Jack Quaid and Jeffrey Dean Morgan come together to solve a mystery, then Neighborhood Watch will not disappoint."
