= Aja Kim =

American singer and songwriter

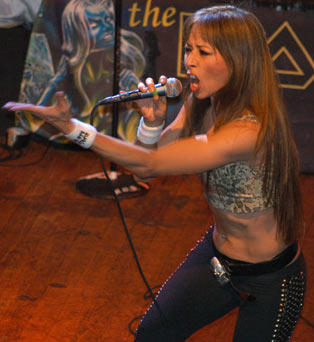
- Aja Kim performing as Bruce 'LEE' Chickinson

Background information
- Genres: Heavy Metal; Hard rock Rock; Blues; R&B/Soul; Tribute
- Occupations: Vocalist; Songwriter; Musician
- Years active: 1990s—Present
- Website: www.ajakim.net

Aja Kim is an American singer and songwriter.

== Biography ==
Born in Fayetteville, North Carolina, and raised in Philadelphia, Pennsylvania Aja Kim first came to public attention when she collaborated with rock and roll saxophonist, Clarence Clemons (who was best known as a member of Bruce Springsteen's E Street Band) on the 1995 Japan-only CD release Aja and the Big Man - Get It On. Three songs she co-wrote were her solo vocal contributions to the CD, along with a duet with Clarence of the Ike & Tina Turner classic "Baby, Get It On." She was prominently featured alongside Mr. Clemons on the cover of the release.

In early 2004, Kim joined the all-female tribute band The Iron Maidens, who had been holding auditions for a new lead vocalist following the departure of member Jenny Warren. She made her onstage debut with the Maidens at the Galaxy Theater in Santa Ana, CA, on May 28, 2004. In addition, she surprised the band, management and fans by recording all of her lead and background vocal tracks for the Maidens' self-titled debut album in a span of less than three days.

On July 1, 2008, Kim announced in her fan newsletter, Adventures in Ajaland, her departure from the Iron Maidens to resume her solo recording and writing career. This was subsequently reported, along with news of her songwriting collaboration with Motörhead guitarist, Phil Campbell, on Blabbermouth.net.

== Discography ==
- Aja and The Big Man - Get It On (Clarence Clemons) (1995)
- Straight from the Heart (Carlos Guitarlos) (2003) - "Ain't That Loving You" (with Mike Watt)
- Shades Of Blue (Bruce Conte) (2004)
- Modern Babylon (Aja Kim) (2005)
- World's Only Female Tribute to Iron Maiden (The Iron Maidens) (2005/2006)
- Route 666 (The Iron Maidens) (2007)
- The Root of All Evil (The Iron Maidens) (2008)

== Media ==
Aja Kim has been featured as a solo artist, with Clarence Clemons and with The Iron Maidens, in the Los Angeles Times, Guitar World, Metal Hammer, Hammerworld (Hungary), Metal Edge, Kerrang, The Japan Times, Gibson Lifestyle, FHM, Maxim, Music Connection Magazine, Japan's Burn Magazine, Korea's Hot Music Magazine, The OC Register, Salt Lake City Weekly, Phoenix New Times, Houston Press, Spokane 7, Fairbanks Daily News, Anchorage Daily News, as well as on The Tonight Show with Jay Leno, KCAL's 9 on the Town (L.A.), KDBC 4 News (El Paso, TX) and 97.1 KLSX's The Two Media Whores w/ David Adelson & Conway and Whitman (L.A.).
