= Girls Got Rhythm! =

Compilation album by Various artists
- Released: August 22, 2006
- Genre: Heavy metal Hard rock Punk rock
- Label: Liquor & Poker Records

Girls Got Rhythm! is a compilation album featuring various all-female tribute bands. The album is named after the song of the same title by AC/DC.

== Track listing ==
1. "Thunderstruck" – ThundHerStruck (AC/DC Tribute)
2. "Run to the Hills" - The Iron Maidens (Iron Maiden Tribute)
3. "Fairies Wear Boots" - Mistress of Reality (Black Sabbath Tribute)
4. "Surrender" - Cheap Chick (Cheap Trick Tribute)
5. "Love Gun" - Black Diamond (KISS Tribute)
6. "Last Caress" - Ms. Fits (Misfits tribute)
7. "Back in Black" - Hell's Belles (AC/DC Tribute)
8. "I Don't Know" – The Little Dolls (Ozzy Osbourne Tribute)
9. "The Lemon Song" – Zepparella (Led Zeppelin Tribute)
10. "Lick It Up" – Kissexy (KISS Tribute)
11. "Dog Eat Dog" - Whole Lotta Rosies (AC/DC Tribute)
12. "Sheena Is a Punk Rocker" - The Ramonas (Ramones Tribute)
13. "Foxy Lady" - Foxey Lady (Jimi Hendrix Tribute)
