= World's Only Female Tribute to Iron Maiden =

The Iron Maidens: World's Only Female Tribute to Iron Maiden
- Catalog No. XQAK-1002

Studio album by The Iron Maidens
- Released: 2005 (US); December 6, 2006 (Japan)
- Recorded: Silvercloud Recording Studios, Burbank, CA; Galaxy Theater, Santa Ana, CA (Track 12); Sound Arena Rehearsal Studios, Van Nuys, CA (Track 13)
- Genre: Heavy metal
- Length: 60:44; 73:53 (Japanese release)
- Label: DRZ Records (US); Powerslave Records (Japan)
- Producer: The Iron Maidens and Mark Dawson

The Iron Maidens chronology
The Iron Maidens: World's Only Female Tribute to Iron Maiden (2005)	Route 666 (2007)

The Iron Maidens: World's Only Female Tribute to Iron Maiden is the debut album by American all-female tribute band The Iron Maidens. The album features selected tracks originally performed by British heavy metal band Iron Maiden. Michael Kenney, keyboardist for Iron Maiden, appears as a guest musician on the Japanese import version.

The album was recorded by the band's third-generation lineup, which consisted of co-founders Linda McDonald (drums), Sara Marsh (guitar) and Josephine Draven (guitar), along with Wanda Ortiz on bass and Aja Kim on lead vocals. Draven left the band a few months after the album was released. Even though her replacement, Elizabeth Schall, was pictured on the Japanese release version, Draven was still credited as playing all stage left guitars. Schall was released from the band two months before this album was released in Japan.

The cover artwork was done by Derek Riggs, best known for his artwork on majority of Iron Maiden's albums. It features Edwina T. Head, a female version of Iron Maiden's mascot Eddie. The Maidens have jokingly stated during an interview that the design of Edwina was inspired by Paris Hilton.

The Maidens' version of "Run to the Hills" is featured on the 2006 various artists compilation Girls Got Rhythm! (released by Liquor & Poker Records).

== Track listing ==
All songs written by Steve Harris, unless indicated otherwise.

=== 2005 DRZ Records Release ===
1. "The Number of the Beast" – 5:02
  - Introduction narrated by Aja Kim
2. "2 Minutes to Midnight" (Bruce Dickinson, Adrian Smith) – 6:09
3. "Children of the Damned" – 4:42
4. "The Trooper" – 4:12
5. "Wasted Years" (Smith) – 5:06
6. "Killers" (Paul Di'Anno, Harris) – 5:05
7. "Aces High" – 5:17
  - Begins with Winston Churchill's speech
8. "Phantom of the Opera" – 7:17
9. "Run to the Hills" – 3:55
10. "Hallowed Be Thy Name" – 06:41
11. "Remember Tomorrow" (Live) (Di'Anno, Harris) 05:26
  - Hidden track that plays approximately two minutes after "Hallowed Be Thy Name"

=== 2006 Powerslave Records Release ===
1. "The Number of the Beast" – 5:03
2. "2 Minutes to Midnight" (Dickinson, Smith) – 6:09
3. "Children of the Damned" – 4:43
4. "The Trooper" – 4:12
5. "Wasted Years" (Smith) – 5:08
6. "Killers" (Di'Anno, Harris) – 5:05
7. "Aces High" – 5:19
8. "Phantom of the Opera" – 7:17
9. "Run to the Hills" – 3:54
10. "Hallowed Be Thy Name" – 6:42
11. "Remember Tomorrow" (Live) (Di'Anno, Harris) – 5:27
12. "Seventh Son of a Seventh Son" (Live) – 10:40
13. "Genghis Khan" (Live Rehearsal) – 4:14
  - Contains a portion of "Where Eagles Dare"

== Personnel ==
- Aja Kim (a.k.a. Bruce Lee Chickinson) – vocals
- Sara Marsh (a.k.a. Mini Murray) – lead guitar, backing vocals on "The Number of the Beast"
- Josephine Draven (a.k.a. Adrienne Smith) – rhythm guitar
- Elizabeth Schall (a.k.a. Adrianne Smith) – rhythm guitar (credited on the Japanese release version)
- Wanda Ortiz (a.k.a. Steph Harris) – bass
- Linda McDonald (a.k.a. Nikki McBurrain) – drums

with

- Michael Kenney – keyboards on "Seventh Son of a Seventh Son"

=== Credits ===
- Derek Riggs – cover artwork
- Michael Maysonet – disc artwork, fan artwork
- Linda McDonald – CD sleeve/tray layout
- Ernie Manrique – photography
- Robert Anthony – cover photography
- RJ Blaze – fan artwork
- Tom Martin – fan artwork
- Patricia Owa – fan artwork
- Manitu Rivera – fan artwork
- Cody Cushman – fan artwork
