= Wayne Pacelle =

American animal activist (born 1965)

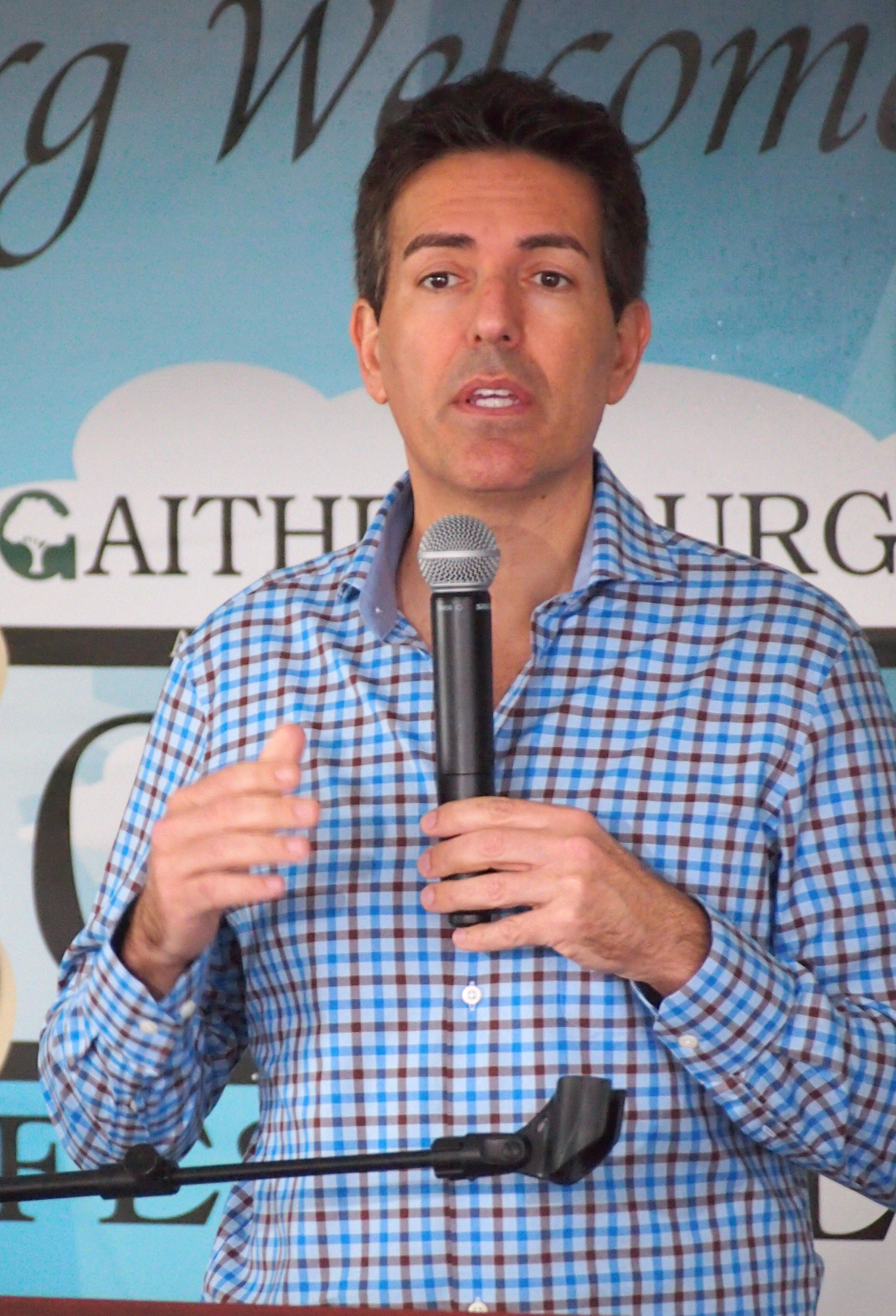
- Pacelle reading at the Gaithersburg Book Festival in 2016
- Born: August 4, 1965 (age 61); New Haven, Connecticut, U.S.
- Education: Yale University, (B.A. in history and environmental studies, 1987)
- Occupations: Animal activist, former non-profit businessperson, author
- Years active: 1989–present
- Known for: Animal activism, serving as the former CEO of the Humane Society of the United States, and authoring two New York Times bestsellers
- Notable work: The Bond: Our Kinship with Animals, Our Call to Defend Them (2011); The Humane Economy: How Innovators and Enlightened Consumers are Transforming the Lives of Animals (2016)
- Spouses: Kirsten Rosenberg (divorced) Lisa Fletcher (m. 2013)

Wayne Pacelle (born August 4, 1965) is an American animal rights and animal welfare activist, non-profit businessperson and author. Two of his books have been New York Times best-sellers. He has led dozens of winning ballot measures on animal protection, shepherded to passage dozens of federal bills into law, and negotiated hundreds of agreements with corporations – from securing pledges from all major global athletic wear brands to stop sourcing kangaroos, to negotiating agreements with major fashion companies to stop selling fur, to securing pledges from McDonald's and other companies to stop sourcing eggs and pork from producers that rely on housing systems utilizing small cages and crates.

Pacelle is the president and founder of Animal Wellness Action, a 501(c)(4) organization that promotes legal standards against cruelty and he is also the founder and president of the Center for a Humane Economy, a 501(c)(3) organization that urges businesses to adopt animal-friendly practices when it comes to their supply chains, research and development, and other operations. He was the president and chief executive officer (CEO) of the Humane Society of the United States (HSUS). Pacelle took office June 1, 2004, after serving for nearly 10 years as the organization's chief lobbyist and spokesperson. Pacelle resigned as CEO on February 2, 2018, after he was accused of sexual harassment by several former employees. Pacelle denied these accusations, and the board voted to retain him as president and CEO. After leaving the head role at HSUS for 14 years, he immediately formed Animal Wellness Action and the Center for a Humane Economy and has grown those organizations into formidable players on national animal welfare policy.

== Early life and education ==
Pacelle was born in New Haven, Connecticut, of Greek and Italian descent. His parents are Richard L. Pacelle Sr., and Patricia Pacelle. Pacelle is the youngest of four children; his older brother, Richard L. Pacelle Jr., is a political science professor at The University of Tennessee. Growing up in New Haven, Pacelle enjoyed reading natural history and developed an early concern about the mistreatment of animals. He attended Notre Dame High School and graduated with degrees in history and environmental studies from Yale University. His activism led to his appointment in 1989, at age 23, as executive director of The Fund for Animals; an organization founded by Cleveland Amory.

== Career ==
=== Humane Society of the United States ===
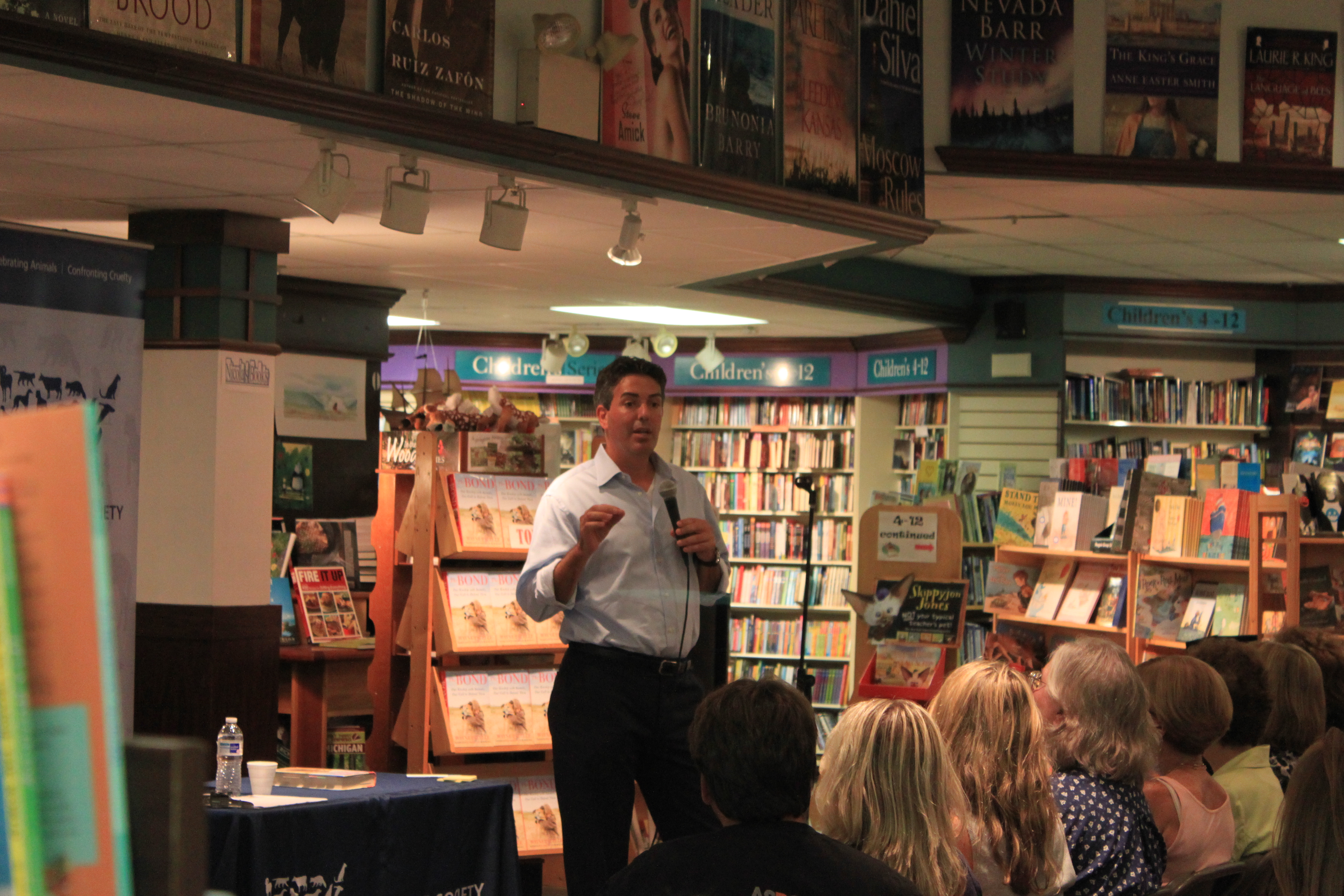
Wayne Pacelle at a book signing event, Ann Arbor, Michigan

While working at the Humane Society of the United States (HSUS), Pacelle secured the passage of dozens of federal statutes and amendments to protect animals, including laws to increase penalties for harming law enforcement animals, protect great apes in their native habitats protections for great apes, sharks, and big cats, elevated punishments for animal fighting, mandated accurate labels for fur, and other legal victories. Pacelle has testified before U.S. House and Senate committees on a wide variety of animal protection issues, including farm animal welfare including calls for increased funding for the Animal Welfare Act and efforts to ban cockfighting, dogfighting, and other harmful practices. He has been vocal in criticizing individuals and groups who he says resort to intimidation, vandalism, or violence.

Under Pacelle's direction, the HSUS secured the adoption of "cage-free" egg-purchasing policies by several hundred universities and corporations and the phase-out of gestation crates by key pork producers nationwide.

Animal cruelty

In early 2008, the HSUS's investigation of animal treatment at the Hallmark/Westland Meat Packing Company sparked the largest beef recall in American history and congressional calls for reform of the slaughterhouse inspection system. In late February 2008, Pacelle testified on the downer cow issue before a subcommittee of the Senate Agriculture Committee on a panel with USDA Secretary Edward Schafer.

Successes

Two November 2006 ballot initiatives conducted with HSUS's support outlawed dove hunting in Michigan and abusive farming practices in Arizona. In January, 2007, several months after passage of the Arizona ballot measure, Smithfield Foods, the largest pork producer in the world, announced that it would phase out the use of gestation crates that immobilize pregnant sows through confinement. Maple Leaf Foods, Canada's largest pork producer and the Strauss Veal company also followed suit.

Agreement with United Egg Producers

In 2011, Pacelle and Chad Gregory of the United Egg Producers (UEP) agreed to work together in support of federal hen welfare legislation. This agreement expired in 2013 after the bill supported by the UEP and The HSUS failed to pass.

Agreement with Sea World

In March 2016, Pacelle and SeaWorld CEO Joel Manby agreed to cooperate on several issues of mutual concern, and SeaWorld agreed to phase out its use of orca whales in performance, to end breeding of captive orcas, and to implement reforms including the introduction of humanely raised products to menus at SeaWorld's theme parks.

Humane Society Legislative Fund

Pacelle is a cofounder of the Humane Society Legislative Fund (HSLF), a 501(c)(4) social welfare organization that lobbies for animal welfare legislation and works to elect humane-minded candidates to public office. He also cofounded Humane USA, a nonpartisan political action committee (PAC) that supports candidates of any political party based on their support for animal protection. These two organizations helped defeat lawmakers in Congress they consider hostile to animals, including Rep. Chris John of Louisiana, Rep. Richard Pombo of California, and Senator Conrad Burns of Montana.

Corporate combinations

The HSUS experienced major growth since 2004, primarily as a result of corporate combinations Pacelle forged with The Fund for Animals in 2005 and the Doris Day Animal League in 2006. During the first 30 months of Pacelle's tenure, overall revenues and expenditures grew by more than 50 percent. HSUS's annual budget for 2006 was $103 million. The organization claims nearly 10 million members and constituents.

=== Founding Animal Wellness Action and the Center for a Humane Economy ===
Since leaving HSUS, Pacelle founded Animal Wellness Action, a 501(c)(4) organization that does lobbying and political work, and Animal Wellness Action PAC, which does non-partisan giving to candidates who support animal welfare. AWA helped oust Rep. Pete Sessions, R-Texas, in the November 2018 election and also Rep. Dana Rohrbacher, R-Calif., whom Pacelle indicated had been hostile to animal welfare issues during their long congressional careers. The organization has worked since its inception in 2018 to help pass a dozen federal laws to advance animal welfare: the Parity in Animal Cruelty Enforcement Act, the Pet and Women's Safety Act, the Dog and Cat Meat Trade Prohibition Act, the Rescuing Animals With Rewards Act, the Preventing Animal Cruelty and Torture Act, the Horseracing Integrity and Safety Act, and the FDA Modernization Act 2.0. Animal Wellness Action and its partner organizations defended the Congressional bans on animal fighting in the U.S. territories in the federal courts, parrying challenges from cockfighting interests in Puerto Rico, Guam, and the Northern Mariana Islands. He's worked to draw attention to illegal animal fighting in those territories and to stop illegal trafficking of fighting animals. The organization was also instrumental in passing Amendment 13 in Florida to ban greyhound racing. That measure, approved with 69 percent to 31 percent in November 2018 shuttered all 12 Florida greyhound tracks by the close of 2020. The organization has recently influenced new federal legislation targeting cockfighting and animal fighting, in the form of the Fighting Inhumane Gambling and High-Risk Trafficking Act, which has more than 800 endorsing agencies and organizations.

Pacelle and Wisconsin-based attorney Joseph Goode representing the Center for a Humane Economy led the negotiations that led to the release of more than 2,000 beagles from Ridglan Farms, one of two suppliers of dogs to laboratories for drug testing and other invasive experiments. Those negotiations led to the release of all dogs at the facility, starting in April 2026 and wrapping up in August. The company announced, toward the last of the rescue operations, that it would cease operations later in the year. This mass rescue of beagles was enabled, in part, by Pacelle’s work in 2022 to push for the passage the FDA Modernization Act 2.0 in Congress. That legislation, led by Senators Rand Paul and Cory Booker, eliminated an animal testing mandate in the federal Food, Drug and Cosmetics Act of 1938, and it was that law that created the immense demand for dogs, primates, and other animals from laboratory suppliers.

== Criticism ==
The HSUS has faced criticism from various groups during Pacelle's tenure, including the Center for Consumer Freedom, which receives money from the food industry, and Protect the Harvest, which is funded by oilman Forrest Lucas.

=== Pacelle's resignation ===
In 2018, Chronicle of Philanthropy reported that Pacelle was under investigation for a "sexual relationship with an employee". In December 2018 HSUS launched an internal investigation, hiring the law firm Morgan, Lewis & Bockius to investigate three separate allegations of sexual harassment. Pacelle has denied each allegation. The investigation also included female leaders who allegedly said their "warnings about his conduct went unheeded." The HSUS voted at the end of January 2018 to retain Pacelle as CEO, prompting seven board members to resign in protest. Other donors threatened to sever ties with the organization, insisting that Pacelle should resign instead. Donors like the Greenbaum Foundation, which donated nearly $100,000 to the HSUS in 2017, claimed they would likely stop funding the HSUS because of the board's handling of the allegations against Pacelle. Other donors such as Nicole Brodeur had stopped providing funding when allegations came to light in October 2017. Facing internal and external dissent, Pacelle resigned on February 2, 2018.

Some defended Pacelle's placement as CEO. The Washington Post's Kathleen Parker offered support in the wake of Pacelle's resignation, claiming that it was not necessarily the best "for the organization he built or the animals it has served..." and thanked Pacelle for his "stewardship, advocacy and legendary work ethic." She added "No person is all one thing, good or bad, and Pacelle is no exception." Other affiliates of the organization supported Pacelle's resignation, claiming that the HSUS board had put Pacelle's fundraising abilities above concerns for other employees in their evaluation of the evidence against Pacelle. Iowa director Josh Skipworth claimed that it was "ridiculous to put the business outlook over the female employees" in the board's original decision to retain Pacelle as CEO. In March 2018, The Washington Post reported on the aftermath of Pacelle's resignation; the article details additional allegations of sexual harassment involving Pacelle.

=== Food and agriculture industries ===
The Center for Consumer Freedom has criticized Pacelle for holding animal rights views, arguing, "When Wayne Pacelle took over, it ceased being an animal welfare group and suddenly became an animal rights group." Under Pacelle, HSUS created state agriculture advisory councils. Members of the agriculture councils have criticized the direction of HSUS, arguing that the agriculture councils' influence has waned while more radical elements of HSUS have gained influence. One Nebraska rancher and spokesperson for the agriculture councils claimed that Pacelle allowed HSUS to become a "good ol' boys vegan club."

=== No Kill ===
Nathan Winograd, a leader of the no-kill movement seeking to end most euthanasia in animal shelters, has been a critic of Pacelle, saying, "We have learned what we can expect under Mr. Pacelle's tenure. Platitudes, cliches, rhetoric, pretty words. But we cannot expect solutions."

== Personal life ==
Pacelle was formerly married to the American singer Kirsten Rosenberg. Since 2013, he has been married to TV journalist Lisa Fletcher. Pacelle has a dog, named Lily.

== Recognition ==
Pacelle has been the subject of profiles by the New York Times Magazine (2008), the Los Angeles Times (2008), The New York Times (2007), The Wall Street Journal (2006), The Washington Post (2004), Newsweek (2007), and other major publications. In 2014, he was named one of the Non-Profit Times' "Power and Influence Top 50." The citation read, "He has played a role in the passage of more than two-dozen federal statutes and 26 successful statewide ballot initiatives, which is why he is a punching bag for puppy mills and pseudo-PR firms that profit from animal cruelty."

For his management of HSUS's response to Hurricane Katrina, The NonProfit Times named Pacelle "Executive of the Year" (2005). In 2008, Pacelle also received a Special Achievement Award for Humanitarian Service from the National Italian American Foundation. The same year, Supermarket News named Pacelle one of its "Power 50", citing his leadership on farm animal welfare issues.

In 2018, Pacelle was noted in the book Rescuing Ladybugs by author and animal advocate Jennifer Skiff as having "arguably orchestrated more positive legal change for animals than any human being in modern times, during the period he was head of the Humane Society of the United States (HSUS) from 2004 to 2018."

== Books ==
The Humane Economy

Pacelle, Wayne (April 19, 2016). The Humane Economy:How Innovators and Enlightened Consumers are Transforming the Lives of Animals. New York City: William Morrow. ISBN 978-0-06-238964-0. "In The Humane Economy he describes how "capitalism at its best" is a force against animal suffering, "applying human creativity to answer the demands of a morally informed market."" The book was on the New York Times, Washington Post, and Los Angeles Times best-seller lists.

- Peter Singer (May 12, 2016). "Open the Cages!". The New York Review of Books.

The Bond

Pacelle, Wayne (April 1, 2011). The Bond: Our Kinship with Animals, Our Call to Defend Them. New York City: William Morrow. ISBN 978-0-06-196978-2. "As harsh as nature is for animals, cruelty comes only from human hands. We are the creature of conscience, aware of the wrongs we do and fully capable of making things right. Our best instincts will always tend in that direction, because a bond with animals is built into every one of us." The book was on the New York Times best-seller list.

- Karen Swallow Prior (2011). "The Bond: On Humans and Other Animals". Books & Culture. Archived from the original on March 10, 2012.

In addition to The Humane Economy and The Bond, Pacelle has contributed to the following books:

- Haas, Robert B. (September 30, 2008) [First published 2002]. African Critters. Washington, D.C.: National Geographic Society. ISBN 978-1-4263-0317-3. Foreword by Wayne Pacelle.
- Hatkoff, Amy (April 1, 2009). The Inner World of Farm Animals: Their Amazing Social, Emotional, and Intellectual Capacities. New York City: Stewart, Tabori & Chang. ISBN 978-1-58479-748-7.
  - Jessica A. Knoblauch (October 14, 2009). "The Inner World of Farm Animals". Archived from the original on March 20, 2012. Introduction by Jane Goodall; Afterword by Wayne Pacelle.
- Kopelman, Jay (February 16, 2010) [First published 2008-07-17]. From Baghdad to America: Life Lessons from a Dog Named Lava. New York City: Skyhorse Publishing. ISBN 978-1-60239-743-9. "[T]his is truly a narrative of introspection, personal adjustment, and love. It centers on Jay, but critical to the story is his wife, his two children, Lava, his fellow service members, and his Marine Corps." (From the foreword by Wayne Pacelle.)
- Marshall, Julie Hoffman (May 15, 2006). Making Burros Fly: Cleveland Amory, Animal Rescue Pioneer. Boulder, Colorado: Johnson Books. ISBN 978-1-55566-346-9. A book about Cleveland Amory. Foreword by Wayne Pacelle.

He and his brother, Richard Pacelle Jr., chair of the University of Tennessee Department of Political Science, co-authored a paper on the legislative history of animal fighting in Society & Animals, an academic journal focused on human-animal studies.

- "A Legislative History of Nonhuman Animal Fighting in the U.S. and Its Territories, Society & Animals", November 2020, pp 1–21.

== See also ==
- List of animal rights activists
- List of vegans
- The Humane Society of the United States (HSUS)
- Animal liberation movement
- People for the Ethical Treatment of Animals (PETA)
- Killing of Cecil the lion, for Pacelle's comments therein
