= Gabba (band) =

British tribute band of ABBA

Gabba is a British tribute band. Based in London, Gabba performs ABBA songs in the stripped-down punk style of the Ramones, a variety of pop punk they dubbed discopunk and claim to have invented. They formed in 1996 and took their name in 1999. They have released one album as of 2006.

== History ==
Gabba was informally formed in 1996 by Stig Honda, an alleged "professor at the Osaka Rock 'n' Roll High School", who enrolled five students from all over the world to fuse the disco-pop of Abba and the punk rock of the Ramones, creating "disco-punk".

In 1999, the band took its name of "GABBA, The Discopunk Sensation". The name is an acrostic on the members' nicknames, echoing both the "gabba hey!" chorus from the Ramones' song "Pinhead" and the name of ABBA.

Their second recording and official debut album, the CD Leave Stockholm (1999), was produced by Stigma Records (UK) and sub-distributed by Rough Trade Records.

According to a band statement, "[In 2001] GABBA release their complex 3rd album, the Spanish language 'Tijuana Dance'. However, the album was banned and withdrawn from sale after just 1 week for being 'Anti-Establishment', due to some confusion over Bee Bee's appalling Spanish translations which inadvertently accused the Queen of England of being a Nazi Stormtrouper (in a stupor, no less). It is unclear if the album will ever be released again."

== Media attention ==
They have been aired mostly in the UK, on Steve Lamacq's BBC Radio 1 The Evening Session, on BBC Television's The Beat Room, on BBC Radio Scotland's The Beat Patrol, and webcast on Virtue TV (now Interoute TV).

They have been written about in magazines such as Mojo, Melody Maker, NME, Time Out, Music365.com, CMJ New Music Monthly, The Ramones UK Fan Club Newsletter, and the London Evening Standard.

They have played alongside bands such as Negativland, The Rezillos, and Chicks on Speed, in various outlets in London, and at the 1999 Christmas parties of Rough Trade Records and Fierce Panda Records.

In related media, their autobiographical musical short film "Gimme Gimme Shock Treatment" (written and directed by Cliff Homow, alias "Cliffy Hormone", and Midge Devitt) won the 2003 "Special Independent Film Award" at London's counterculture Portobello Film Festival.

== Members ==
On stage, acrostically

- Geeky (Japan) - guitar (represents Johnny Ramone)
- Anneky (Sweden) - vocals, chorus (represents Agnetha Fältskog)
- Bjöey (US) - lead vocals (represents Björn Ulvaeus and Joey Ramone)
- Bee Bee (Germany) - bass, vocals (represents Benny Andersson and Dee Dee Ramone)
- Abby (German from Thailand) - drums, vocals, chorus (represents Anni-Frid Lyngstad and Tommy Ramone)

Backstage

- Stig Honda (Japan) - business manager, lyrics (represents Stig Anderson, ABBA manager)
- Phil Smegma (UK) - production manager (represents Phil Ramone and Phil Spector, Ramones producers)
- Monte Malmönik (Sweden) - road manager (represents Monte Melnick, Ramones roadie)

(The countries of origin are alleged by the members, who could possibly be all British.)

== Discography ==
Albums

- (1999) Leave Stockholm (CD out-of-print, now in MP3s and BitTorrent)

Singles and songs on compilations

- (2001) "Gabba Gabba" on Life's a Gas (international tribute album to Joey Ramone)
- (2005) "Gabba Gabba" single on iTunes UK
