= Courtney Cox (musician) =

American guitarist (born 1989)

- Cox in 2025

Background information
- Also known as: CC Shred; Adriana Smith
- Born: May 18, 1989 (age 37)
- Origin: Philadelphia, Pennsylvania
- Genres: Heavy metal, heavy rock, power metal, tribute
- Occupation: Musician
- Instrument: Guitar
- Years active: 2008–present
- Labels: Powerslave; Napalm
- Member of: Burning Witches
- Formerly of: The Iron Maidens; Femme Fatale; Queen Diamond
- Website: facebook.com/Courtneycoxofficial

Courtney Cox is an American guitarist, best known for her time in the all-female Iron Maiden tribute band The Iron Maidens. She is currently the lead guitarist for heavy metal band Burning Witches, and was notably the first female signature artist with Caparison Guitars.

== Career ==
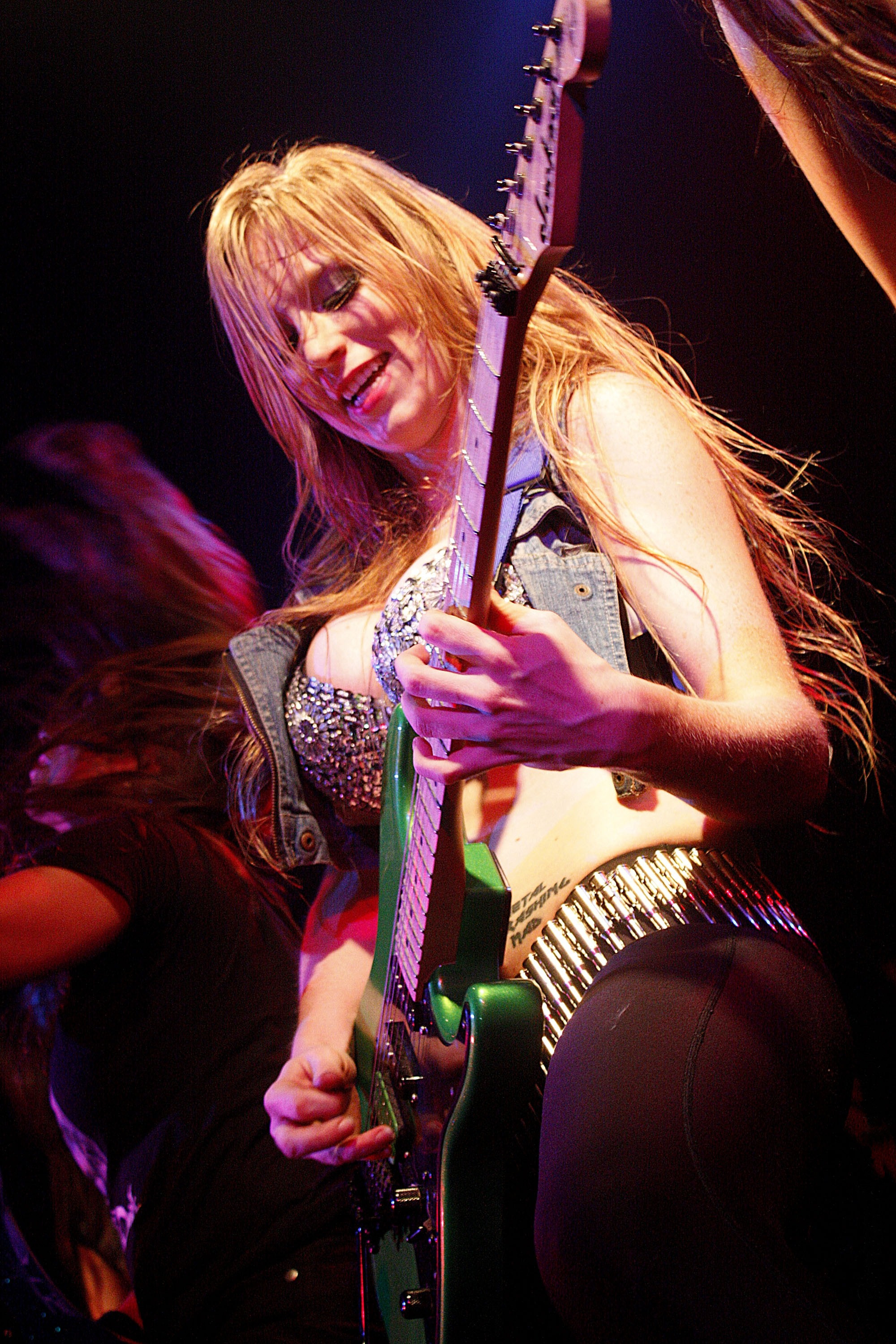
Courtney Cox in 2011

A native of Philadelphia, Courtney Cox started playing guitar around age 13. At 15, she enrolled at The Paul Green School of Rock Music. During her tenure there, she performed in U.S tours with acts including Jon Anderson and Adrian Belew, performing with such artists as George Lynch and Perry Farrell. During that time, Cox co-founded an all-female King Diamond tribute band called Queen Diamond.

At age 19, Cox moved to Los Angeles. In December 2008, she was invited to be a guest performer with the Iron Maidens, and later she became an official member of the band. As a member of the Maidens, Cox's stage name was Adriana Smith, a female version of Adrian Smith. She has also performed several national and international concert tours in the U.S. and in Japan. Cox performed with members of Phantom Blue at the Michelle Meldrum Memorial Concert in May 2009 at the Whisky a Go Go in Hollywood, California.

As the first female artist for Caparison Guitars, Cox released the "signature model Horus-M3 CC". In 2010, she placed runner-up in Guitar World's Buyer's Guide Model Search.

Cox is currently the lead guitarist for Swiss metal band Burning Witches, having replaced Larissa Ernst who was expecting a child.

== Discography ==
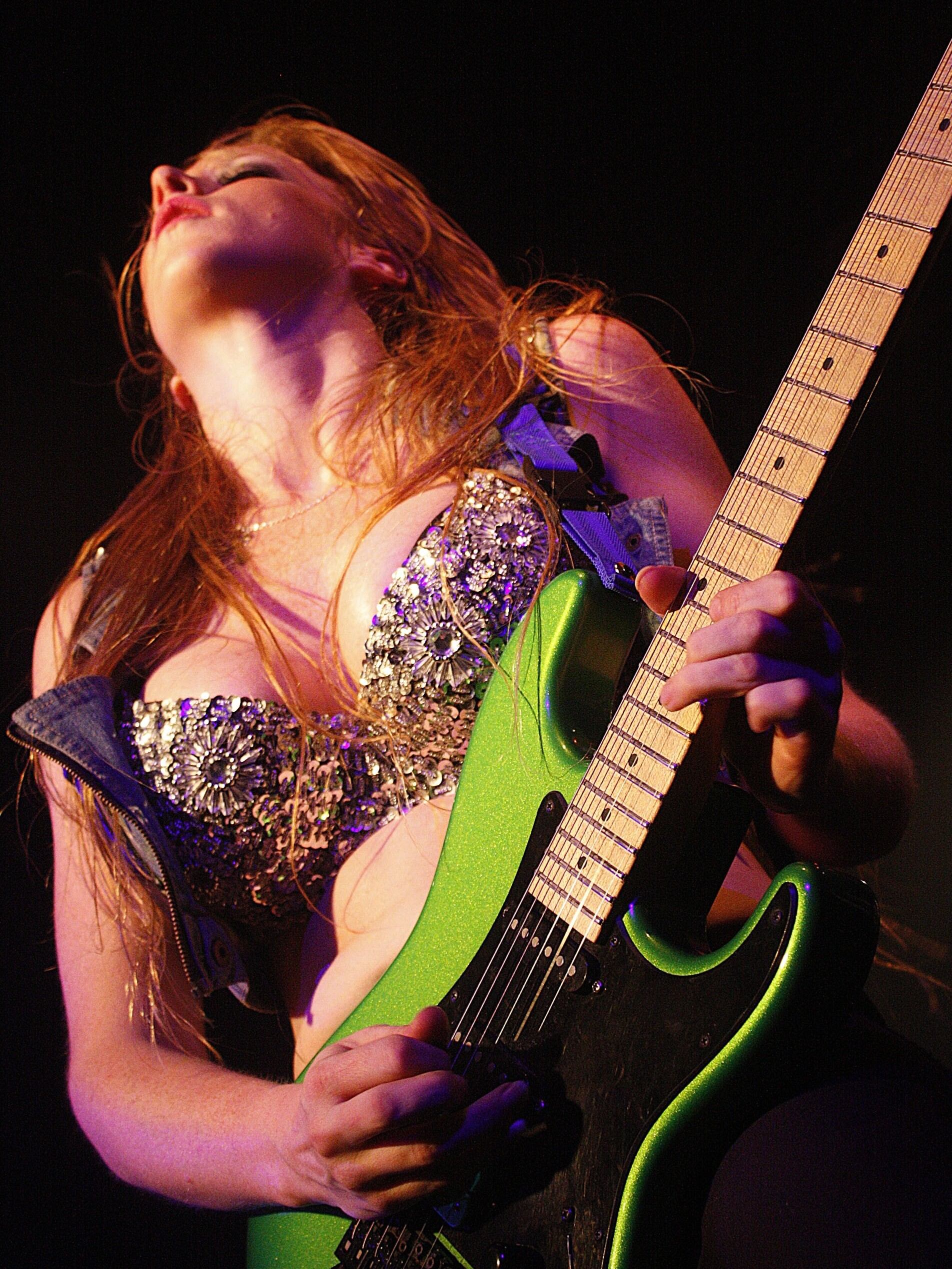
Cox with the Iron Maidens in 2011

The Iron Maidens

- Metal Gathering Tour Live in Japan 2010 (2010) - The Iron Maidens

Burning Witches

- Unleash The Beast - Burning Witches official video (2023)
- World On Fire - Burning Witches official video (2023)
- Evil Witch - Burning Witches official live performance video (2023)
- Inquisition - Napalm Records (2025)
