= Hell's Belles (band) =

AC/DC tribute band

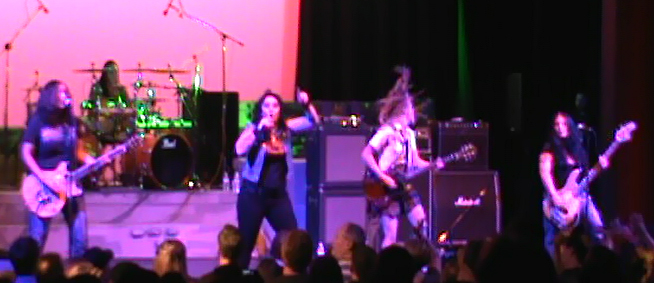
- Hell's Belles, live in 2013

Background information
- Origin: Seattle, Washington, United States
- Genres: Hard rock
- Years active: 2000-present
- Members: Adrian Conner; Nicole Ridge; Simona Bressi; Jess Coram; Lauren Piston
- Past members: Amy Stolzenbach; Sylvia Wiedemann; Om Johari; Melodie Zapata; Sharon Needles; Judy Cocuzza; Lisa Brisbois; Mandy Leinenweber; Amber Saxon; Jamie Nova
- Website: www.hellsbelles.info

Hell's Belles are an all-female AC/DC tribute band from Seattle, Washington, formed in 2000.

== History ==
The band was formed in 2000 by guitarist Amy Stolzenbach and singer Om Johari, with original guitarist Sylvia Weidemann and original drummer Laura Derig. Mandy Reed replaced original bassist Heather Madden in 2001, and Stolzenbach was replaced by Adrian Conner in 2002. Other members included rhythm guitarist Lisa Brisbois. In their early years together the band regularly toured both the United States and overseas, but by 2004 their performances were less frequent, all members having other commitments. By summer 2005, Jamie Nova had been added to the line-up, replacing Johari. Nova was replaced by current vocalist Australian native Amber Saxon since February 2011. Since then they have returned to their constant touring schedule and continue to play all over the United States and have added Singapore to their touring schedule.

Adrian Conner moved to Austin TX in 2004 and started her own original band, Adrian and the Sickness, and tours frequently with them across the US. Their latest album release, B.F.D., was produced by Kathy Valentine of the Go-Go's.

Hell's Belles has toured Canada, Japan and Singapore. The band released an album in 2005, We Salute You, and performed at the Winter and Summer X-Games, the 2009 and 2010 Beerfest Asia in Singapore and Sundance Film Festival in 2007. They are currently working on a second release with new singer Amber Saxon, who is also the singer of Australian band BugGiRL.

Brisbois said of the band in 2005: "We want women to be empowered by this. It makes me proud to be in a band with all women, rock as hard as we do and stay as true to AC/DC as we can."

Angus Young said of the band in 2001: "It's flattering. It's great to know that other musicians like you enough to play a tribute to you." In 2003 he described Hell's Belles as "The Best AC/DC cover I've heard".

== Members ==
- Adrian Conner - lead guitar
- Nicole Ridge - bass guitar, background vocals
- Jessica Coram - rhythm guitar, background vocals
- Simona Bressi - drums
- Lauren Piston - lead vocals

=== Former members ===
- Amy Stolzenbach - lead guitar
- Sylvia Wiedemann - rhythm guitar, background vocals
- Om Johari - lead vocals
- Heather Moritz- bass guitar, background vocals
- Jamie Nova - lead vocals
- Melodie Zapata - drums
- Laura Derig - drums
- Mandy Reed - bass guitar, background vocals
- Lisa Brisbois - rhythm guitar, background vocals part-time
- Sharon Needles - rhythm guitar, background vocals part-time
- Judy Cocuzza - drums
- Amber Saxon - lead vocals
