= Wanda Ortiz =

American bassist

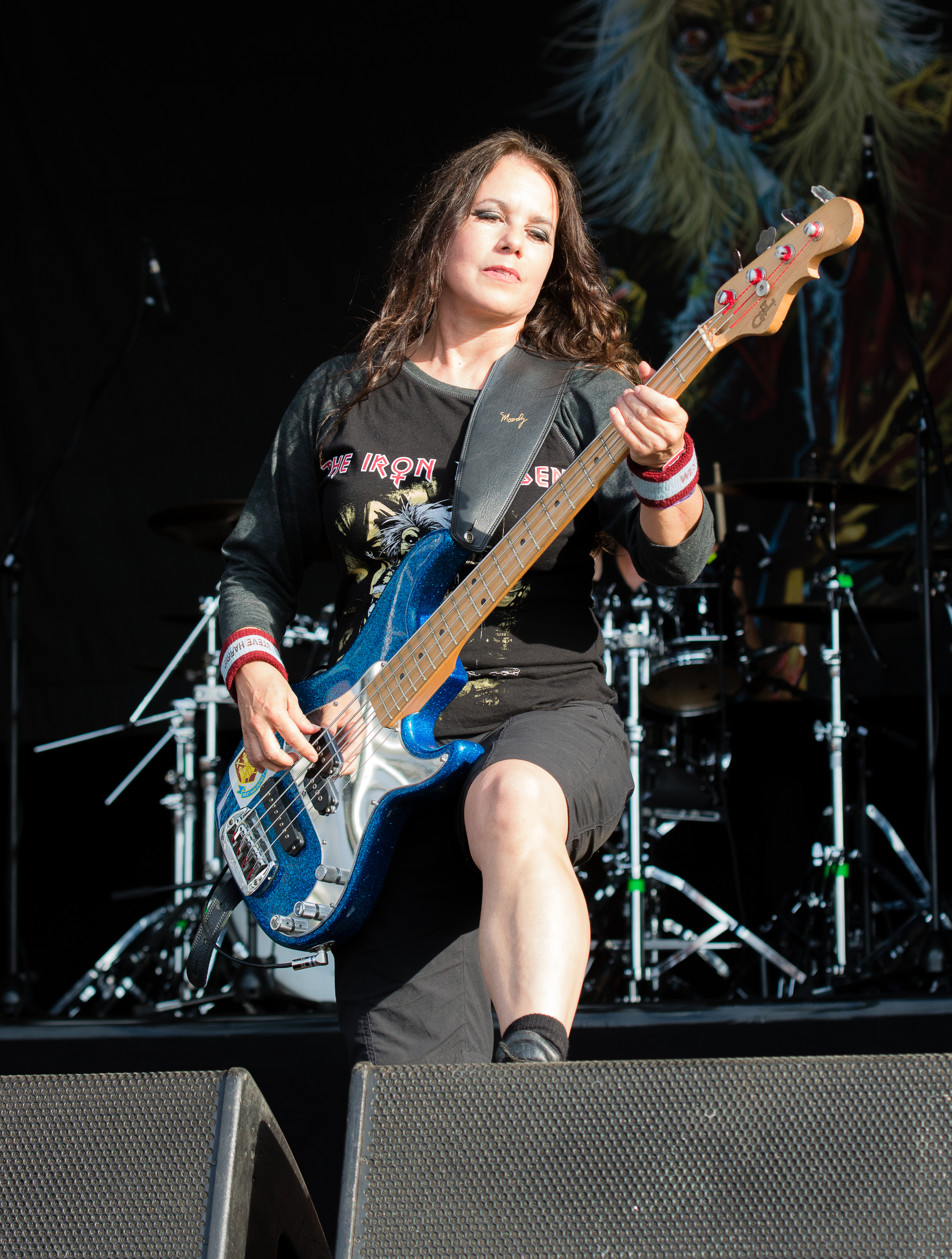
- Ortiz at Wacken Open Air 2022

Background information
- Also known as: Steph Harris (The Iron Maidens)
- Origin: Huntington Beach, California, U.S.
- Genres: Heavy metal, hard rock, blues, classical
- Occupation: Bassist
- Years active: 1997–present
- Member of: The Iron Maidens
- Website: theironmaidens.com

Wanda Ortiz is an American musician best known as the bassist of the all-female tribute band The Iron Maidens (billed as the "World's Only Female Tribute to Iron Maiden").

== Biography ==
Wanda Ortiz first learned to play the bass guitar at the age of nine, when the elementary school she attended had a music program that enabled students to sign up and choose an instrument. When she arrived late on the first day of music class, she wound up with a junior-sized double bass. While she took lessons on the double bass (also known as an upright bass), she taught herself to play electric bass at age 11 so she could play in the school jazz band. She continued playing bass throughout her school years, eventually earning a B.Mus degree from the University of California, Irvine.

Before joining The Iron Maidens, Ortiz was the bassist of the band Rotten Rod & The Warheads from 1997 to 2002 and Heartache City from 1999 to 2001. In 1998 and 2004, Ortiz won the Best Female Bassist award at the Rock City News Awards and in 2003, won the best bassist award at The All Access Music Magazine Awards.

In September 2002, Ortiz joined The Iron Maidens and has remained with the band ever since. As a member of The Iron Maidens, Ortiz's stage name is "Steph Harris", a female version of Iron Maiden bassist/founder Steve Harris.

In addition to The Iron Maidens, Ortiz works as a freelance musician in various groups and orchestras in the Southern California area, including The South Coast Symphony Orchestra as principal bassist since 1996. She was also the bassist of an original rock/blues band called Field of Vision in 2004.

Aside from Steve Harris, Ortiz cites Geddy Lee and Chris Squire among her influences. Her favorite Iron Maiden songs are "Losfer Words (Big 'Orra)", "Phantom of the Opera", "Powerslave" and "Rime of the Ancient Mariner".

== Discography ==
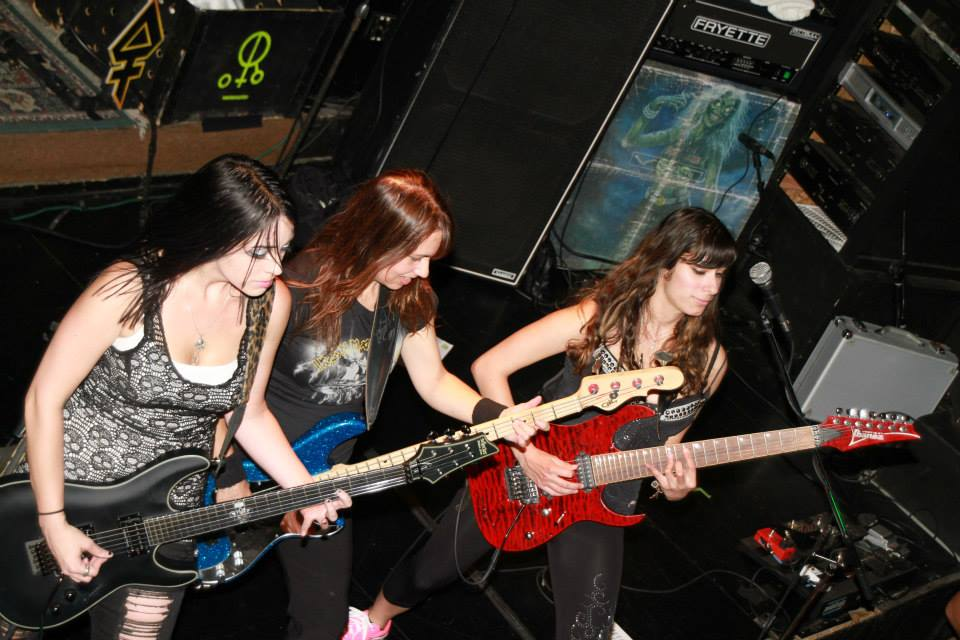
Ortiz (middle) performing with The Iron Maidens

=== Heartache City ===
- Heartache City (2000)

=== Field of Vision ===
- FOV (2004)

=== The Iron Maidens ===
- World's Only Female Tribute to Iron Maiden (2005/2006)
- Route 666 (2007)
- The Root of All Evil (2008)
- Metal Gathering Tour Live in Japan 2010 (video, 2010)

== Equipment endorsers ==
Wanda Ortiz is endorsed by BBE Sound, Gallien-Krueger, G&L Musical Instruments, RotoSound Strings, and Schroeder Superior Sound Cabinets.

Ortiz's main bass guitar on stage is a glitter blue G&L SB-2. She also uses a black SB-2 on select shows.
