= The Iron Maidens =

American heavy metal band

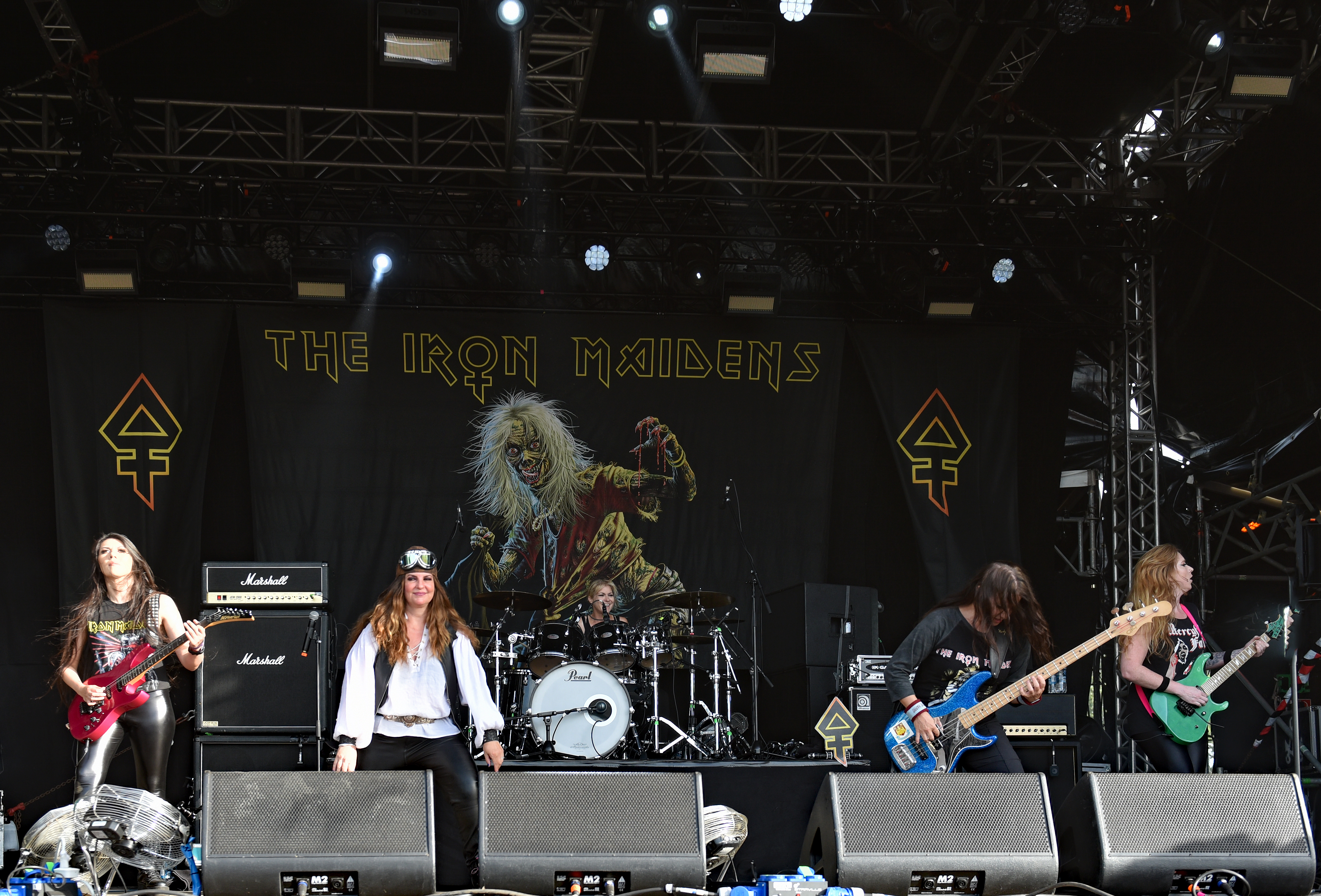
- The Iron Maidens at Wacken Open Air 2022

Background information
- Origin: Los Angeles, California, U.S.
- Genre: Heavy metal
- Years active: 2001–present
- Label: Powerslave
- Members: Linda McDonald; Wanda Ortiz; Kirsten Rosenberg; Nikki Stringfield; Shani Kimelman
- Past members: Melanie Sisneros; Jenny Warren; Jojo Draven; Aja Kim; Elizabeth Schall; Sara Marsh; Heather Baker; Courtney Cox; Nili Brosh; Nita Strauss
- Website: theironmaidens.com

The Iron Maidens are an American heavy metal band from Los Angeles, formed in 2001 as an all-female tribute act to English heavy metal band Iron Maiden. The band currently consists of drummer Linda McDonald, bassist Wanda Ortiz, lead vocalist Kirsten Rosenberg and guitarists Nikki Stringfield and Shani Kimelman.

== History ==
The Iron Maidens were originally formed in June 2001 by lead vocalist Jenny Warren and bassist Melanie Sisneros, formerly of the Iron Maiden tribute band Wrathchild. Drummer Linda McDonald and guitarist Josephine Draven, both formerly of Phantom Blue, and guitarist Sara Marsh, joined Warren and Sisneros shortly afterward to form the band's first lineup. Sisneros left the band in 2002 to pursue other interests and was replaced by Wanda Ortiz.

In 2003, the band started work on their debut album. The project was delayed when Warren gave notice of her departure from the band to focus more on her personal and child's needs. After Warren's departure, new vocalist Aja Kim made her debut in the band and helped complete the album (World's Only Female Tribute to Iron Maiden), which was released in June 2005.

After the album's release, Draven left the band. In February 2007, Heather Baker joined to replace Draven. In May, the band released its second album Route 666, which features a guest appearance by Motörhead guitarist Phil Campbell.

In summer 2008, Heather Baker and Aja Kim left the band to pursue solo careers. The two were replaced by guitarist Courtney Cox and vocalist Kirsten Rosenberg (formerly of the Maryland-based cover band HighWire). In January 2010, Marsh, who was ill, was taken off some of the Japanese tour shows and did not rejoin the band. Baker rejoined the band to temporarily fill in Marsh's spot for a handful of shows.

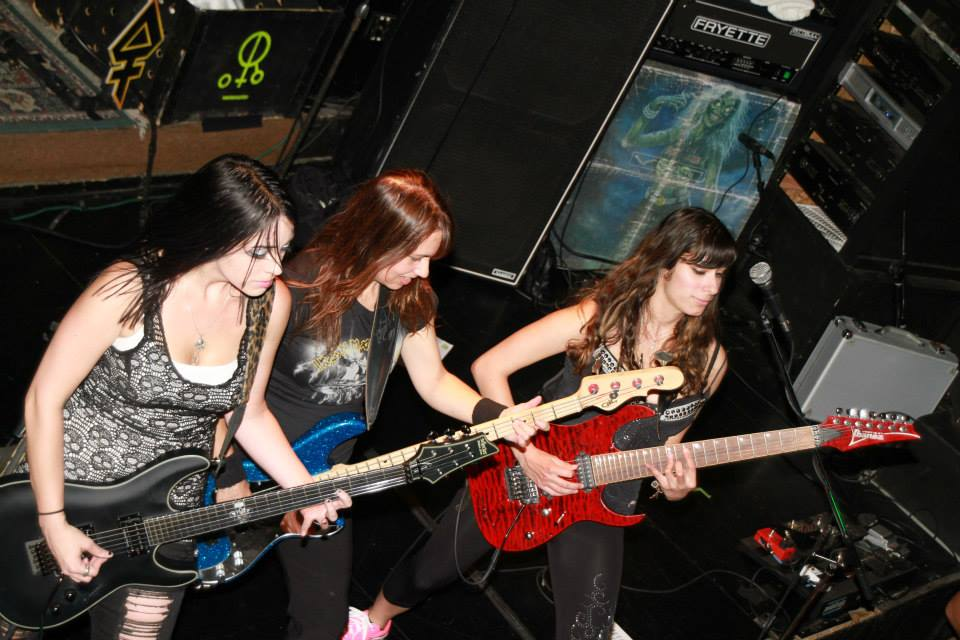
L-R: Nikki Stringfield, Wanda Ortiz, and guest guitarist Nili Brosh

In August 2010, The Iron Maidens released a DVD of their Japan tour titled Metal Gathering Tour Live in Japan 2010.

Upon Marsh's departure from the band, former members Elizabeth Schall and Heather Baker would return briefly to fill in the vacant Murray position (2009–2010). For tours 2010–2014, the role of Dave Murray would be shared between artists Nili Brosh, Nita Strauss, and Nikki Stringfield. In 2014, the band approached Nikki Stringfield to become a permanent member in the Murray position.

Nita Strauss (Ibanez), Courtney Cox (Caparison) and Nikki Stringfield (Schecter) are the first female artists to have their own signature guitar with their associated guitar companies.

In June 2014, Nita Strauss was hired to replace Orienthi as Alice Cooper's touring guitarist for the remaining 2014 tour dates. She has toured with Alice Cooper since that time.

On September 8, 2015, the group announced that long-time guest guitarist Nikki Stringfield had been officially added as a permanent member of the band.

Rosenberg and Stringfield appeared as contestants on the August 3, 2017, episode of the music game show Beat Shazam.

In August 2023, Courtney Cox announced that she was leaving The Iron Maidens to take up a full time role in Burning Witches.

== Band members ==
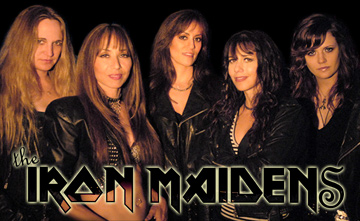
The Iron Maidens 2007–2008 Lineup

Current

- Linda McDonald ("Nikki McBurrain") – drums, backing vocals (2001–present)
- Wanda Ortiz ("Steph Harris") – bass, backing vocals (2002–present)
- Kirsten Rosenberg ("Bruce Chickinson") – lead vocals (2008–present)
- Nikki Stringfield ("Davina Murray") – guitars, backing vocals (2012–present)
- Shani Kimelman – guitars (2023–present)

Former / fill-in

- Melanie Sisneros ("Steve Heiress") – bass (2001–2002)
- Jenny Warren ("Bruce Chickinson") – lead vocals (2001–2003)
- Jojo Draven ("Adrienne Smith") – guitars (2001–2005)
- Sara Marsh ("Mini Murray") – guitars (2001–2010)
- Aja Kim ("Bruce Lee Chickinson") – lead vocals (2003–2008)
- Elizabeth Schall ("Adrianne Smith" and "Deena Murray") – guitars (2005–2006)
- Heather Baker ("Dee Murray" and "Adrienne Smith") – guitars (2007–2008, 2010)
- Courtney Cox ("Adriana Smith") – guitars, backing vocals (2008–2023)
- Nili Brosh ("Mega Murray") – guitars (2010–2013)
- Nita Strauss ("Mega Murray") – guitars (2011–2015)
- Alyssa Day – guitars (2024–present)
- Steph Goyer – guitars (2024–present)

== Discography ==
=== Albums ===
- World's Only Female Tribute to Iron Maiden (2005)
- Route 666 (2007)
- The Root of All Evil (2008)

=== Videos ===
- Metal Gathering Tour Live in Japan 2010 (2010)
