= Tribute act =

Musical act playing the music of another

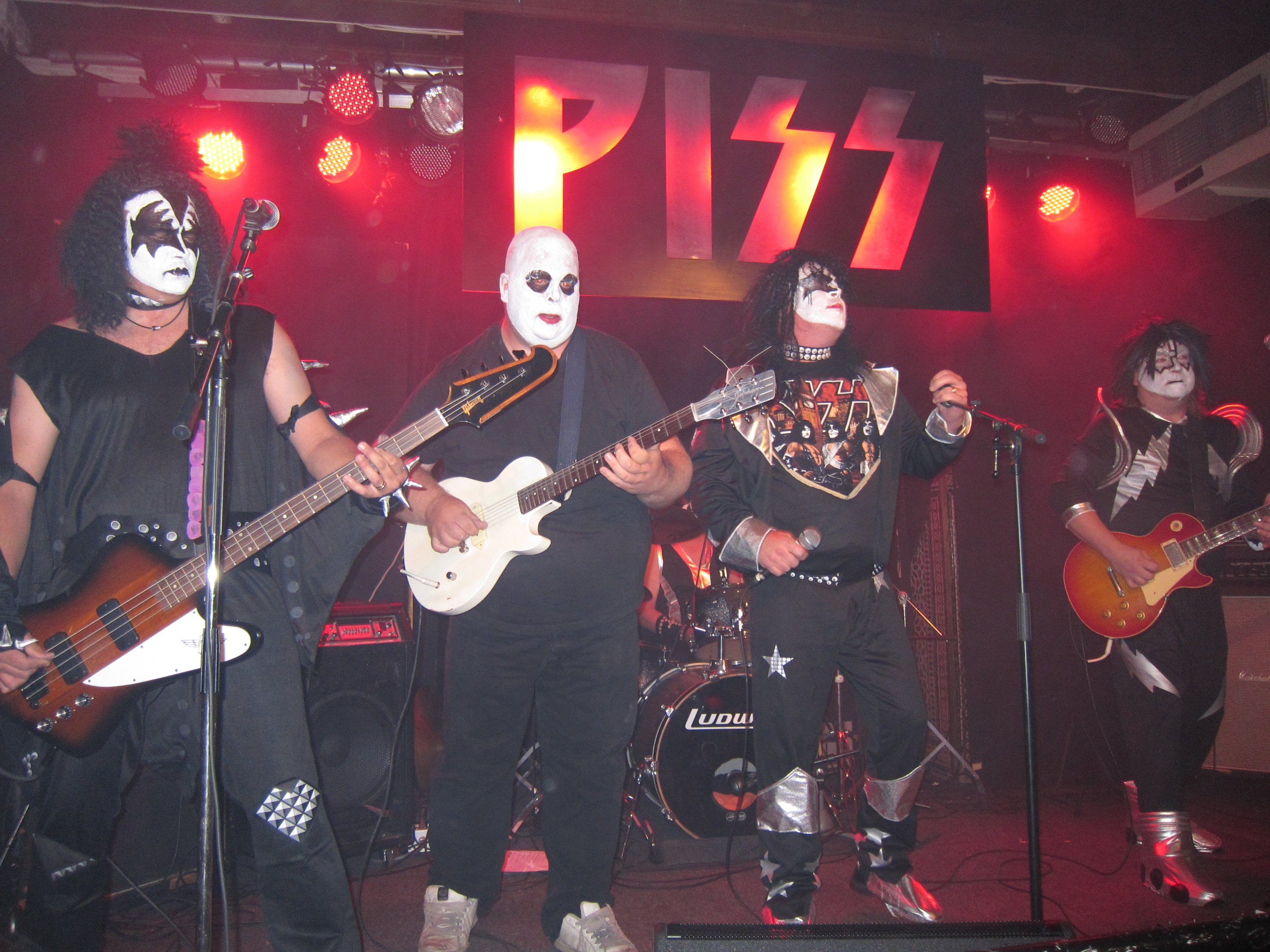
Piss, a tribute band to Kiss

A tribute act, tribute band, tribute group or tribute artist is a music group, singer, or musician who specifically plays the music of a well-known music act. Tribute acts include individual performers who mimic the songs and style of an artist, such as Elvis impersonators covering the works of Elvis Presley or groups like The Iron Maidens, an all-female band that pays tribute to Iron Maiden.

Many tribute bands, in addition to playing the music of an artist or group, also try to emulate the vocal styles and overall appearance of that group, to make as close an approximation as possible. Others introduce a twist on the original act; for example, Dread Zeppelin plays Led Zeppelin songs in a reggae style with a lead singer dressed up as Elvis Presley, while Gabba perform the songs of ABBA in the style of the Ramones. Tribute bands usually name themselves based on the original band's name (sometimes with a pun), or on one of their songs or albums.

== History ==
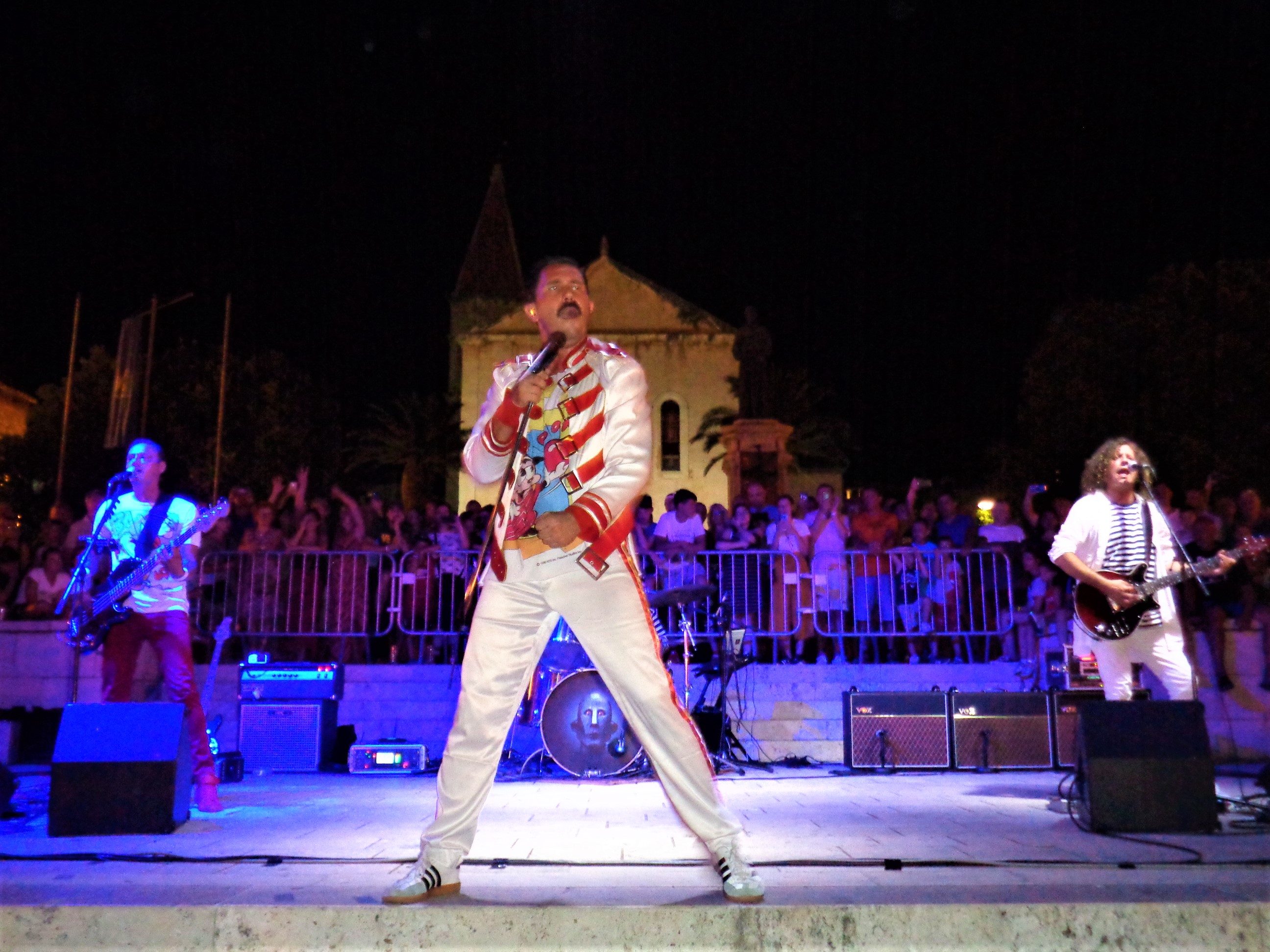
Queen Real Tribute Band, a tribute to Queen

In 1997, the British journalist Tony Barrell wrote a feature for The Sunday Times about the UK tribute-band scene, which mentioned bands including Pink Fraud, the Pretend Pretenders and Clouded House. In the article, Barrell asserted that "the main cradle of the tribute band...is Australia. Starved of big names, owing to their reluctance to put Oz on their tour itineraries, Australians were quite unembarrassed about creating home-grown versions. Then, like an airborne seed, one of these bands just happened to drift to Britain." The band in question was the ABBA tribute Björn Again, who staged a successful publicity stunt in the early 1990s, arriving at Heathrow Airport in white one-piece outfits similar to the ones worn by ABBA on the cover of their 1976 album, Arrival. Other tribute acts such as The Beatnix (Beatles), Zeppelin Live, and The Australian Pink Floyd Show have experienced continued popularity for over a decade.

Lead singer Rob Halford left Judas Priest in 1992 and was replaced by Tim "Ripper" Owens from the tribute band British Steel in 1996. This was the first publicised example of a tribute performer joining the band they were paying tribute to and was the inspiration for the 2001 film Rock Star. Owens eventually left Judas Priest in 2003 when Halford rejoined the band. Later occurrences of this same phenomenon include Tommy Thayer replacing Ace Frehley in Kiss in 2002 and Benoît David replacing Jon Anderson in Yes after performing with a Yes tribute band called Close to the Edge. Similarly, Martin Jakubski, vocalist of Marillion tribute act StillMarillion, regularly appears in Marillion guitarist Steve Rothery's solo shows.

In 2000, filmmakers Jeff Economy and Darren Hacker produced the documentary film ...An Incredible Simulation, which examined the tribute band phenomenon. The title was taken from the promotion of Beatlemania advertised as "Not the Beatles, but an incredible simulation."

== See also ==
- Cover version
- Cover band
- Elvis impersonator
- Tom Jones impersonator
- Tribute album
