= Patrick Kennison =

American rock musician

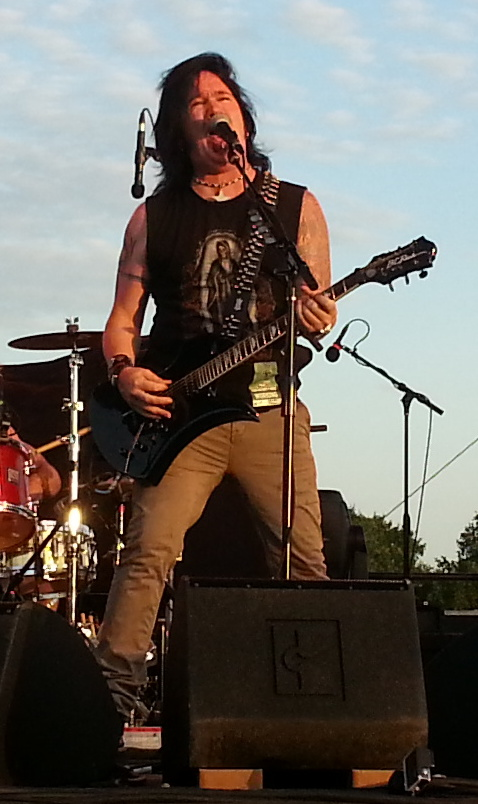
- Patrick Kennison performing with Heaven Below

Background information
- Origin: San Antonio, Texas, U.S.
- Genres: Rock; nu metal; heavy metal; hard rock
- Occupations: Singer, guitarist
- Years active: 1996–present
- Member of: Heaven Below, Lita Ford, 3-Faced
- Formerly of: The Union Underground

Patrick Kennison is an American rock musician. He co-founded The Union Underground, who played on Ozzfest 2001 and released an album, An Education in Rebellion, which sold 350,000 copies. Union Underground broke up due to musical differences, with Kennison forming a new band, "3-Faced", with Marty O'Brien.

== Career ==
In early 2008, he formed a new band called Heaven Below, serving as its lead singer.

In 2011, Kennison toured with Jani Lane.

In November 2014, he joined Lita Ford's band.

On Sundays in February 2022, Kennison and Heaven Below/The Iron Maidens guitarist Nikki Stringfield will perform during their residency at Hard Rock Cafe in Hollywood, California.

On 26 June 2022, Kennison plans to release Live in the Living Room which he created with Stringfield. The two plan to perform that same date at Hard Rock Cafe in Hollywood, California.

Additionally, on the last 2 Wednesdays in July 2022, Kennison plans to perform at the same venue with Stringfield.

On 24 January 2025, Kennison and Stringfield plan to release Ghost Notes, the debut EP from the husband and wife duo. The album will coincide with the 2025 Live Drama Tour starring American heavy metal guitarist Marty Friedman.

== Discography ==
=== As producer ===
==== Nikki Stringfield ====
- Harmonies for the Haunted (2019)
- Apocrypha (2023)

=== As featured artist ===
==== William Shatner ====
- Seeking Major Tom (2011)

==== Rob Zombie ====
- "Two-Lane Blacktop" (2003)

=== Heaven Below ===
==== Studio albums ====
- Countdown to Devil (2009)
- Falling From Zero (2012)
- Good Morning Apocalypse (2016)
- The Majestic Twelve (2025)
- Alternate Abductions (2026)

==== Other albums ====
- We Sold Our Soul for Heaven Below (2008)
- Infamy (EP) (2008)
- Reworking the Devil (2009)
- Heaven Below (2010)
- Unleashed in the West (2011)
- The Mirror Never Lies: Mega-Single (2011)
- Dos Diablos Digital Box Set (2013)
- The Deadlight Sessions (2013)
- Sleeping Giants (2013)
- Demonic Demos & Unsung Lullabies (2014)
- Rest in Pieces (2020)

=== Union Underground ===
- ...An Education in Rebellion (2000)

=== Solo career ===
- Live in the Living Room (with Nikki Stringfield) (2022)
- Ghost Notes (with Nikki Stringfield) (2025)
