= Countdown to Devil =

Studio album by Heaven Below
- Released: February 11, 2009
- Genre: Rock
- Length: 45:28
- Label: Heaven Below
- Producer: Ben Moody

Heaven Below chronology
Countdown to Devil (2009)	Falling From Zero (2012)

Countdown to Devil is the first studio album by rock band Heaven Below. The album was released on February 11, 2009.

== Composition ==
=== The Laughing Dead ===
"The Laughing Dead", the tenth track on the album, was at one time, a candidate for the name of the band. Having a lyric mentioning "Heaven Below", the song helped the band decide on its current moniker. EMURG describes the song as one being "about enjoying every minute of life".

=== When Daylight Dies ===
"When Daylight Dies" has been played on more than 4 dozen radio stations in the United States including Hard Drive and The Rock 30. Lead vocalist Patrick Kennison and Marty O'Brien, Heaven Below's bassist at the time who performed and continues to perform in We Are the Fallen befriended Ben Moody of Evanescence and We Are the Fallen. When Moody heard the track, he told the band that while he'd like to produce the entire Countdown to Devil album, that he had availability for one song only. When Moody stated that he wanted to make "a cinematic song that sounds like something epic", Kennison agreed to have Moody work on the song.

== Critical reception ==
EMURG states that the vocals for the album "are right on par with their dominating drums and guitars". With respect to "The Takeover", the second track of the work, the site states that lead vocalist Patrick Kennison "makes a valid attempt" to "overshadow those drums" but "once the guitar solo hits, all hope is lost". EMURG goes on to say that "This song is musically driven and it doesn’t matter what the lyrics are at this point" and states that "The Congregation" has a similar measure to it. "Judgment Day”, a tune about looking inside of one's self and wishing to improve upon who they are is described as "a fitting ending" with EMURG giving them "kudos for ending on a “smart”note rather than seeking to end the album with a brutal mosh-worthy song". The site goes on to exclaim that ending with "Judgement Day" "gives [the listener] a more satisfied feeling", as the listener's "brain is mentally full of great music".

== Track listing ==
1. "All Rise" - 0:55
2. "The Takeover" - 3:35
3. "The Congregation" - 3:31
4. "Scream" - 3:58
5. "Heartbreak Anthem" - 2:50
6. "A Thousand Years" - 4:03
7. "When Daylight Dies" - 3:59
8. "The Radio Song" - 3:46
9. "Major Tom" - 4:12
10. "The Laughing Dead" - 3:39
11. "In the Arms of Your Lies" - 3:09
12. "Judgement Day" - 3:54
13. "When Daylight Dies" (acoustic) - 3:57
