= Battalion of Death =

Battalion of Death can refer to a number of military units in various countries:

In Poland

- Poznań Volunteer Death's Battalion (Polish: Poznański Ochotniczy Batalion Śmierci), active within the ranks of 1st Legions Infantry Division during the Polish–Bolshevik War
- II/36th Infantry Regiment, which earned its nickname during the Polish–Ukrainian War of 1919
- Battalion of Death for Freedom, a resistance organisation formed in Toruń in 1939, during World War II

In Russia

- The Women's Battalion of Death was a small corps drawn from 2,000 female volunteers, formed between the February Revolution and the October Revolution in Russia in 1917, commanded by Maria Botchkareva, and loyal to the Provisional Government
- Chechen Death Battalion, commanded by Apti Bolotkhanov, which fought in the Russo-Ukrainian War

Other meanings of the term include:

- The International Battalion of Death is the name taken by the person or group behind a website claiming responsibility for suicide attacks in Bali and elsewhere in the aftermath of September 11
- The Detroit Tigers' infield from 1933 to 1935 consisting of Hank Greenberg at first base, Charlie Gehringer at second base, Billy Rogell at shortstop, and Marv Owen at third base.
- Other American sporting outfits have at various times been called Battalion of Death, possibly drawing inspiration from a Black Battalion of Death formed by African-American Buffalo Soldiers of World War I.
- Certain Republican senators formed a hard core that opposed President Woodrow Wilson's proposed League of Nations. They were known as "irreconcilables" or 'the Battalion of Death."
- "Death Battalion", a song on the 2016 album Good Morning Apocalypse by Heaven Below
