= Apocrypha (disambiguation) =

Apocrypha are works, usually written, of unknown authorship or of doubtful origin.

Apocrypha may also refer to:

- Biblical apocrypha, works sometimes attached to the Hebrew Bible
- New Testament apocrypha, early Christian works rejected by most churches
- "Apocrypha", an episode of The X-Files
- Apocrypha, a realm in the video game The Elder Scrolls V: Skyrim – Dragonborn
- Fate/Apocrypha, a light novel series and its anime adaptation, taking place in an alternative timeline to Fate/Stay Night
- Apocrypha, an album by American heavy metal musician Nikki Stringfield
