= Straight Through the Heart =

Straight Through the Heart can refer to:

- "Straight Through the Heart", a song from the 1983 album Holy Diver by Dio
- "Lightning Strikes (Straight Through the Heart)", a song from the 1984 album Night of the Blade by Tokyo Blade
- "Straight Through the Heart", a song from the 2003 album The Unauthorised Breakfast Item by Caravan
- "Straight Through the Heart", a song from the 2019 EP Harmonies for the Haunted by Nikki Stringfield
- Mitten ins Herz, a 1983 film by Doris Dörrie, also known as Straight Through the Heart
