= Turn Me On "Mr. Deadman" =

"Turn Me On 'Mr. Deadman'"

Single by The Union Underground

from the album ...An Education in Rebellion
- Released: June 28, 2000
- Genre: Nu metal
- Length: 2:38
- Label: Portrait; Columbia
- Songwriters: Bryan W. Scott; Patrick Kennison
- Producers: Don Gilmore; Bryan Scott; Patrick Kennison

The Union Underground singles chronology
"Turn Me On 'Mr. Deadman'" (2000)	"Killing the Fly" (2001)

"Turn Me On 'Mr. Deadman'" is a song by American nu metal band The Union Underground. The song was released as the first single from the band's only studio album to date, ...An Education in Rebellion. The song peaked at no. 11 on the Billboard Mainstream Rock chart. This song was featured in a puzzle in Notpron.

== Musical style ==
Metal Hammer called the song "a nu metal anthem" and stated the song "owes more to Rob Zombie and Marilyn Manson's industrial stomp than it does to Limp Bizkit's big-shorted shenanigans."

== Reception ==
The song was ranked at no. 36 on Metal Hammer's list of "The 40 best nu metal songs of all time".

Marilyn Manson heard the song in a strip club and hand-picked The Union Underground to be his tour mates. The band would tour with Manson in fall 2000.

== Track listing ==
Maxi single

No.	Title	Length
1.	"Turn Me On 'Mr. Deadman'" (Expletives Barely Deleted Version #1 w/ Patrick Kennison Clean Intro)	2:44
2.	"Bryan Scott – Clean Intro"	0:04
3.	"Patrick Kennison – Clean Intro"	0:07
4.	"Bryan Scott – Not So Clean Intro"	0:06
5.	"Turn Me On 'Mr. Deadman'" (Expletives Barely Deleted Version #1)	2:38
6.	"Turn Me On 'Mr. Deadman'" (Expletives Barely Deleted Version #2)	2:38

Enhanced single

No.	Title	Length
1.	"Turn Me On 'Mr. Deadman'"	2:38
2.	"South Texas Death Ride" (Live)	3:31
3.	"Killing the Fly" (Live)	3:58
4.	"Turn Me On 'Mr. Deadman'" (Music Video)	2:41

Promo single

No.	Title	Length
1.	"Turn Me On 'Mr. Deadman'" (Clean Version)	2:38
2.	"Turn Me On 'Mr. Deadman'" (Explicit Version)	2:38

== Personnel ==
The Union Underground

- Bryan Scott – vocals, guitar, co-producer
- Patrick Kennison – guitar, co-producer
- John Moyer – bass
- Josh Memelo – drums

Additional

- Don Gilmore – producer
- Brendan O'Brien – mixing
- George Marino – mastering
