= Tear the World Down =

Studio album by We Are the Fallen
- Released: May 10, 2010
- Recorded: October – December 2009
- Genres: Hard rock, nu metal
- Length: 46:13
- Label: Universal Republic
- Producers: We Are the Fallen, Dan Certa

Singles from Tear the World Down
- 1. "Bury Me Alive" Released: February 2, 2010; 2. "Tear the World Down" Released: October 12, 2010

Tear the World Down is the first and only studio album by hard rock band We Are the Fallen. It was released in the United Kingdom on May 10, 2010 and the United States on May 11, 2010 under the Universal Republic record label. It includes their first single "Bury Me Alive". The album debuted on the Billboard 200 at No. 33, selling 13,000 for the week. It has sold 41,000 copies as of September 2010.

== Critical reception ==
Andy Greenwald Entertainment Weekly gave the album a B−, writing: "Smithson’s voice shines over Moody’s familiar stew of metal riffs and gothy strings. Too bad the subject matter seems cribbed from a teen's Tumblr." Stephen Thomas Erlewine of AllMusic rated the album 3 out of 5 stars, stating that the group sounds exactly like Fallen-era sans "the sour charisma of Amy Lee" and the "genuine" musical tension Lee and Moody had. Singer Carly's presence "steers [the album] toward pure product, but that was the intention" and the record would "please those who like the sound of Fallen but could do without all the sulkiness." Faye Lewis of Rock Sound rated it 8 out of 10 stars, opining that it is "familiar terrain revisited" but the songs show "the bite of a band with something to prove" and the band "rock harder than Evanescence ever could." Kirsten Coachman of Seattle Post-Intelligencer said that "the main issue with the album and the band is that they don't seem to have developed an identity of their own, yet", lacking authenticity in the music or a "sound that would set them apart". However, some songs indicate "there is potential for this band to set itself apart and stand on its own." Trey Willie Sputnikmusic gave the album a "poor" rating of 2 out of 5 stars, writing that it "sounds old and tired" in its Fallen likeness and "without the strong songwriting" of Fallen. The riffs "lack any real identity or true variation", the "symphonic elements feel as if their inclusion was an afterthought", and "the melodic sections ... are either too weak or too brief to make a real impact", concluding that "absolutely no effort was made to do more than cash in on Evanescence fans' nostalgia for a seven year old album."

The album's musical style was regarded as hard rock and nu metal.

== Track listing ==
No.	Title	Length
1.	"Bury Me Alive"	4:46
2.	"Burn"	3:43
3.	"Paradigm"	3:55
4.	"Don't Leave Me Behind"	3:33
5.	"Sleep Well, My Angel"	4:07
6.	"Through Hell"	3:41
7.	"I Will Stay"	4:07
8.	"Without You"	3:16
9.	"St. John"	3:58
10.	"I Am Only One"	4:37
11.	"Tear the World Down"	6:30
Total length:		46:13

B-Sides

- "Samhain" – 4:07
- "Like a Prayer" – 4:11

== Personnel ==
We Are the Fallen

- Carly Smithson – vocals
- Ben Moody – lead guitar, programming, piano, percussion
- John LeCompt – rhythm guitar, mandolin, programming
- Marty O'Brien – bass
- Rocky Gray – drums

Additional musicians

- Jeremiah Gray – percussion
- Daniel Moody – piano, B3
- David Hodges – piano
- Phillip Peterson – Cello, strings on "I Am Only One"
- Bethanie and John "J.C." LeCompt II – additional choir vocals on "Burn"
- David Campbell – string and choir arrangement

Production

- Dan Certa – producer, engineering, programming
- Jay Baumgardner – mixing
- Ted Jensen – mastering
- Doug Sonders – photography

== Charts ==
Chart performance
Chart (2010)	Peak position
Canadian Albums (Nielsen SoundScan)	54
US Billboard 200	33
US Top Alternative Albums (Billboard)	7
US Top Hard Rock Albums (Billboard)	6
US Top Rock Albums (Billboard)	12

== Release history ==
Release history
Region	Date	Ref.
United Kingdom	May 10, 2010	
Canada	May 11, 2010	
United States	May 11, 2010	
Brazil	May 21, 2010	
