= Higher Than Heaven (disambiguation) =

Higher Than Heaven is a 2023 studio album by Ellie Goulding.

Higher Than Heaven may also refer to:

- "Higher Than Heaven", a song by Heaven Below from their 2012 album Falling from Zero
- "Higher Than Heaven", a song by Powerwolf from their 2015 album Blessed & Possessed
- "Higher than Heaven", a song by Tomorrow X Together from their 2024 EP The Star Chapter: Sanctuary
