= Bury Me Alive (song) =

Single by We Are the Fallen

from the album Tear the World Down
- Released: February 2, 2010
- Recorded: 2010
- Studio: NRG Studios
- Length: 4:46 (album version); 3:54 (radio edit); 3:57 (original version); 4:55 (acoustic version)
- Label: Universal Republic Records
- Composers: Carly Smithson, Ben Moody, Marty O'Brien, Rocky Gray, John LeCompt
- Lyricist: Ben Moody
- Producer: Dan Certa

We Are the Fallen singles chronology
"Bury Me Alive" (2010)	"Tear the World Down" (2010)

"Bury Me Alive" is the first single from the rock group We Are the Fallen's debut album, Tear the World Down.

== History ==
It was released on February 2, 2010, exclusively online at digital media outlets. An alternate acoustic version of the song was also released on the same day via the band's official website for free with registration to their mailing list.

A previous version of the track was released on June 22, 2009, as a free download exclusively to the first 100,000 people to register an email address on the band's official website. However, due to the overwhelming number of requests for the free download, the band also decided to stream the song on their MySpace fanpage.

== Music video ==
Pallbearers in the "Bury Me Alive" music video.

The music video for "Bury Me Alive" was recorded in February 2010 with director Kyle Newman. His wife Jaime King was playing the part of the woman being buried. The video uses a funeral and burial as a metaphor in comparison to a relationship ending as a result of disillusionment. The video premiered March 25, 2010, on AOL's "Noisecreep" website.

== Appearances ==
The song was used in the trailer for the season 1 finale of The Vampire Diaries.

== Track listing ==
Digital download

1. "Bury Me Alive" – 4:46
