= Kilgore (band) =

American metal band

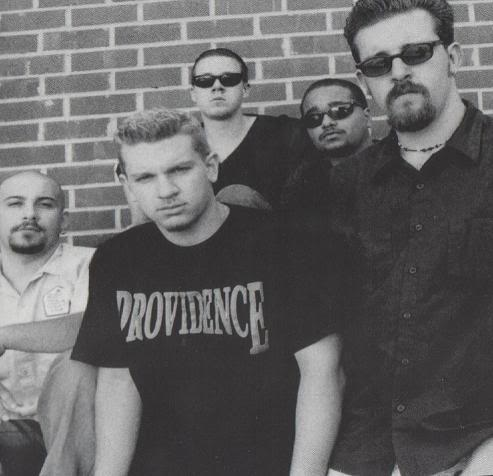
- Kilgore promo photo for Blue Collar Solitude 1995

Background information
- Also known as: Kilgore Smudge; Smudge; Stain
- Origin: Providence, Rhode Island, United States
- Genres: Alternative metal; nu metal; post-grunge; groove metal
- Years active: 1991–2000, 2007, 2016–present
- Labels: Giant; Revolution; Warner Bros.
- Past members: Jay Berndt; Brian McKenzie; Mike Pelletier; Jason Smith; Ronnie Saran; Bill Southerland; Marty O'Brien; Steve Johnson; Erick Linsao

Kilgore (formerly Kilgore Smudge) is an American heavy metal band formed in Providence, Rhode Island in 1991. The band is named after the character Kilgore Trout in the Kurt Vonnegut classic Breakfast of Champions. Through a number of band name and line-up changes, Kilgore released two albums, Blue Collar Solitude (1995) and A Search for Reason (1998). The band landed a slot on the 1998 Ozzfest. They followed with a 1998 national tour with Slayer and Fear Factory and a 1998 European tour with Fear Factory and Spineshank.

== History ==
The band started in 1991 at Rhode Island Catholic high school La Salle Academy in Providence. Once or twice a semester, the bands would gather for concerts attended by most of the student body. This allowed many of the musicians their first concert opportunities. Outside of the school, the band began to work on original music influenced by Iron Maiden, Black Sabbath, Metallica and Faith No More. The band was composed of songwriter Brian McKenzie (guitar), Bill Southerland (drums), Jason Smith (bass), Erick Linsao (guitar), and Jay Berndt (vocals). The band was first known as Regicide during high school and played its first shows at band concerts at La Salle Academy.

After high school they changed their name to Smudge, and started to develop and fine tune their sound. The music became more aggressive containing a groove element with hints of their early influences as well as elements of the New York hardcore scene. Jay Berndt's lyrics were influenced by the Beat Generation authors, Fyodor Dostoyevsky, Franz Kafka and Charles Bukowski. His vocal style was sometimes compared to Glenn Danzig of the Misfits or Scott Weiland of Stone Temple Pilots. The fast almost hardcore-like songs, along with Jay Berndt's lyrics and vocal melodies, allowed the band to really stand out.

They released their first demo cassette called Spill (1993) and began playing shows at numerous Providence clubs and opening for established acts as The Cro-Mags, Sick of It All, Sheer Terror and Life of Agony. After discovering an Australian pop-punk band by the same name, they changed their name to Stain. As Stain, they released another cassette demo, Die Cast, in 1994. It was the release of Die Cast that brought the band to the attention of manager Scott Cohen (music business) and Giant/Revolution Records (subsidiary of Warner Bros. Records), with whom they signed a recording contract. Around this time Berndt suggested the band name "Kilgore Smudge" as a nod to the protagonist from the classic Kurt Vonnegut novel Breakfast of Champions. By the end of 1994, Mike Pelletier replaced Linsao on guitar.

=== Blue Collar Solitude (1995) ===
In 1995, Kilgore Smudge released Blue Collar Solitude, recorded in Los Angeles with producer Howard Benson. The band opened for acts such as Marilyn Manson, Biohazard, Clutch and Sublime. The months spent on the road took its toll on Jason Smith (bass), who was replaced in 1996 by Steve Johnson.

=== A Search for Reason (1998) ===
The band flew out to Los Angeles for four months to write, rehearse and record A Search for Reason, which was produced by Ed Stasium. Marty O'Brien was then asked to join the band to replace Steve Johnson. The band marked the release of A Search for Reason with a string of east coast dates starting at New York City's Coney Island High club. As a new management deal was inked, the band shortened their name to just Kilgore and then landed a spot on Ozzfest 1998. While on tour with Ozzfest, Kilgore recorded a cover of Pantera's "Walk" for Extreme Championship Wrestling. The song was used as Rob Van Dam's entrance music. They followed Ozzfest with a 1998 national tour with Slayer and Fear Factory, and finished the year with a European tour with Fear Factory and Spineshank.

=== Break-up and reunion ===
Singer Jay Berndt left the band and the music industry in early 1999. In 2005, he returned to music by fronting Providence country band The Revival Preachers and released an album, Breathin' Through a Bruise. He is currently signed to North Carolina record label Rusty Knuckles and released a solo album called Sad Bastard Songs in October 2010.

In 2003, guitarist Brian McKenzie began performing as a solo singer/songwriter and released two solo albums. In 2009, McKenzie began working with Jay Berndt who produced his forthcoming album, Resolution, to be released in 2010.

Pelletier, Southerland and O'Brien moved to Los Angeles in 2000 to look for a new singer for Kilgore. Shortly after arriving, Marty O'Brien began playing with Tommy Lee's Methods of Mayhem as well as providing session work for other artists. He now plays with We Are the Fallen.

Mike Pelletier began scoring video game soundtracks and was playing with In for the Kill.

Bill Southerland returned to Providence and has been working with children for the last few years. In 2008, Southerland and Berndt reunited for a short time in a heavy metal band called Bloodwitch which also featured members of Massachusetts band Seemless.

In 2007, original members Jay Berndt, Brian McKenzie, Bill Southerland, and Jason Smith reunited to play a benefit show in Providence, RI called "Fight to Remember". The band helped to raise over $13,000 and all proceeds went to Susan G. Komen for the Cure and National Philanthropic Trust for breast cancer treatment and research.

Stated on their Facebook page, they are going to record new music and tour in 2017. On December 23, 2017, the band released a new song titled "Death on the Installment Plan". An EP titled Someday This War Is Going to End was released on December 29, 2017.

== Discography ==
=== Studio albums ===
- Blue Collar Solitude (1995)
- A Search for Reason (1998)
- The Complete Die Cast Sessions (2016)

=== EPs ===
- Someday This War Is Going to End (2017)

== Members ==
=== Current members ===
- Jay Berndt – vocals (1991–2000, 2007, 2016–present)
- Bill Southerland – drums (1991–2000, 2007, 2016–present)
- Brian McKenzie – guitars (1991–1997, 2007, 2016–present)
- Marty O'Brien – bass (1998–2000, 2016–present)

=== Former members ===
- Erick Linsao – guitars (1991–1994)
- Mike Pelletier – guitars (1994–2000)
- Jason Smith – bass (1991–1996, 2007)
- Steve Johnson – bass (1996–1998)
