= Heaven Below (EP) =

EP by Heaven Below
- Released: August 17, 2010
- Genre: Rock
- Length: 22:01

Heaven Below chronology
Infamy (2008)	Heaven Below (2010)	The Deadlight Sessions (2013)

Heaven Below is the self-titled EP from rock ensemble Heaven Below. The album was released on August 17, 2010.

== Composition ==
The band had been closing shows on their then recent inaugural tour with audience favorite "Ace of Spades" by Motörhead. At one of their rehearsals, Patrick Kennison jokingly sung "Heartbreaker" by Pat Benatar over the instrumentals for "Ace of Spades". Because the band enjoyed how "Heartbreaker" sounded, they decided to record a studio version of the song.

In addition to the six main tracks, the album contains a CD with 4 bonus tracks and 4 music videos, one of which is "Twilight Zone", originally recorded by Dutch rock band Golden Earring.

== Critical reception ==
Marissa Brown from Artistdirect, described the EP as a "Most brilliantly bludgeoning performance" while Robert Foster from Metal Edge stated that "Every track explodes with expression". Blabbermouth.net as well as Brave Words & Bloody Knuckles both noted that "despite being such a young band, they can easily keep pace with the top dogs of the current rock scene".

== Track listing ==
1. Dying Vicariously - 3:15
2. When Daylight Dies - 3:48
3. Heartbreaker - 3:13
4. King of Nothing - 3:55
5. Hollywood - 3:36
6. Above the Satellites - 4:14
