= Harmonies for the Haunted (EP) =

EP by Nikki Stringfield
- Released: October 30, 2019
- Genre: Heavy metal
- Length: 22:07
- Label: Nikki Stringfield
- Producer: Jesse Billson; Patrick Kennison

Nikki Stringfield chronology
Harmonies for the Haunted (2019)	Apocrypha (2023)

Harmonies for the Haunted is the debut EP for American heavy metal musician Nikki Stringfield. Released on 30 October 2019, the album was produced by American musicians Jesse Billson and Patrick Kennison.

== Background ==
In early 2019, Stringfield announced plans to create her first solo EP before the end of the year. In the middle of the year, the guitarist announced that the title of the album would be Harmonies for the Haunted. In September she stated that she expected to release the album at the end of October 2019. In mid October, Stringfield published "When the Devil Comes Down", the first single from the EP.

Regarding the work, the singer stated that:

"each song is a little different from the other. I really tried to focus more on song writing than anything. Some songs are more vocally driven and others are more focused on guitar. I played every instrument except for the drums; Jesse Billson handled the drums and produced/engineered the entire album. He really made it sound awesome and I couldn’t have done it without him! Patrick Kennison of Heaven Below/Lita Ford helped record and produce my vocals…he really helped take things to the next level! I’ve poured my heart and soul into this over the past year so I’m excited to finally release it!"

== Critical reception ==
All That Shreds magazine stated that "Stringfield's five-song EP shows her continuing improvement of music and lyrics from the two previous songs she released as singles a couple of years ago", going on to say that "From the beginning 'When the Devil Comes Down' to the close of the EP with 'Straight Through the Heart,' Stringfield displays her multi-talents of singing and playing with production assistance from Lita Ford guitarist Patrick Kennison".

== Track listing ==
All tracks are written by Nikki Stringfield.

No.	Title	Length
1.	"When the Devil Comes Down"	3:55
2.	"Haunted"	5:15
3.	"Unbroken"	3:58
4.	"Take Me"	3:48
5.	"Straight Through the Heart"	5:11
Total length:		22:07

== Personnel ==
- Nikki Stringfield - guitars, vocals, bass, lyrics
- Jesse Billson - drums, production
- Tristan Greatrex - album art
- Adam Hendershott - photography
- Patrick Kennison - production
