= The Union Underground =

American nu metal band

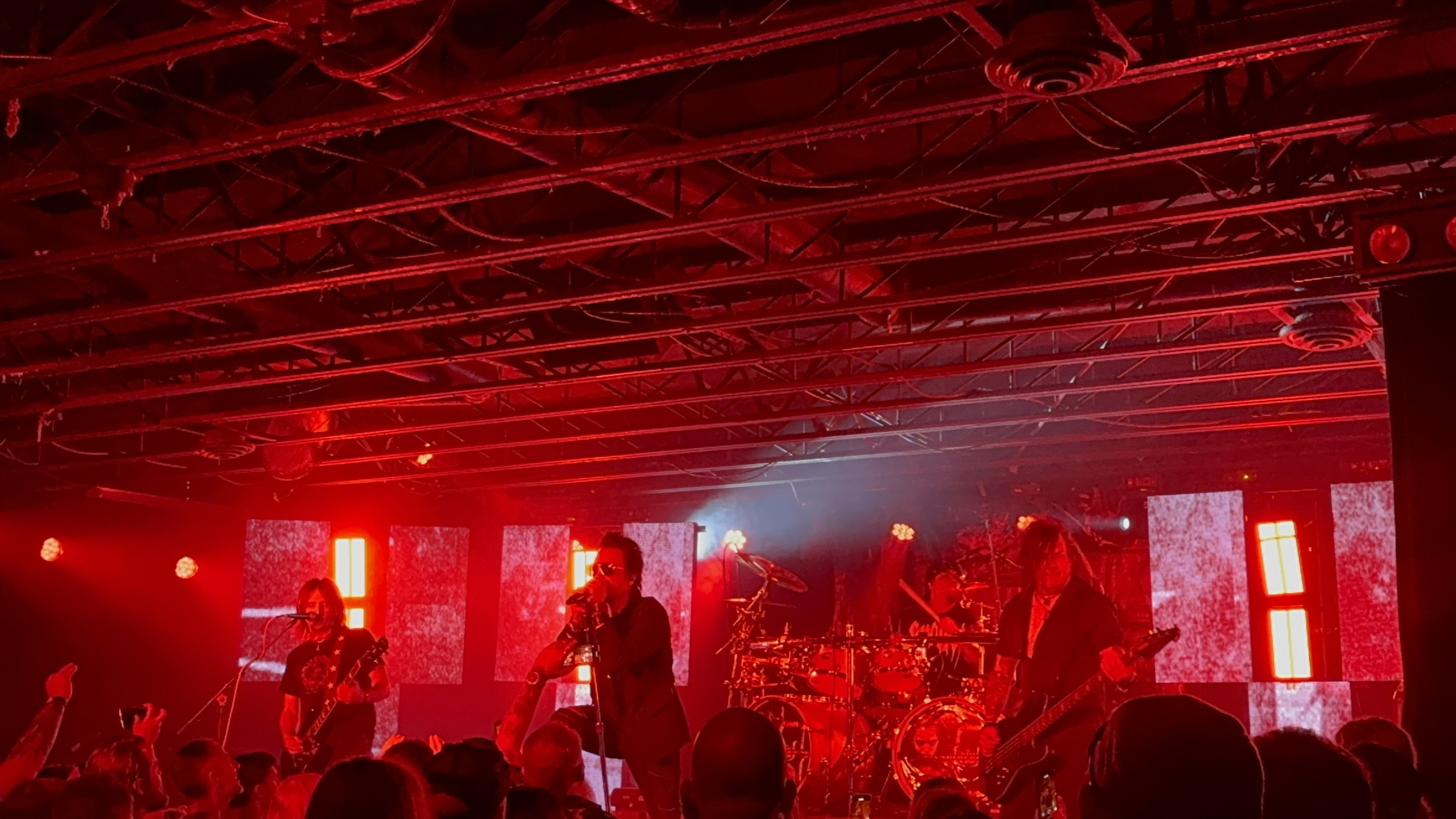
- The band in 2025

Background information
- Origin: San Antonio, Texas, U.S.
- Genre: Nu metal
- Years active: 1996–2002; 2016–present
- Labels: Columbia; Portrait
- Members: Bryan Scott; Todd "Taz" Osterhouse; Elias "Bones" Andra; Ilyn Nathaniel
- Past members: Patrick Kennison; John Moyer; Josh Memelo; Troy Doebbler; Jason West; Robin C. Lopez; Mike "Metal Mike" Lopez; Diego "Ashes" Ibarra

The Union Underground is an American nu metal band based out of San Antonio, Texas. Original band members included Bryan Scott, Patrick Kennison, John Moyer and Josh Memolo. They released one major label album, ...An Education in Rebellion, in 2000 which featured the hit singles "Turn Me On 'Mr. Deadman'" and Revolution Man, as well as the fan-favorite "South Texas Deathride". They are also known for their single "Across the Nation" which was featured as the theme for WWE Raw from 2002 to 2006.

== History ==
=== 1996–2002: ...An Education in Rebellion and break-up ===
The roots of heavy metal band the Union Underground lie in the relationship between singer/guitarist Bryan Scott and guitarist Patrick Kennison, who met in junior high school in San Antonio, Texas. After finishing high school, the two launched their own recording studio, Studio Underground, making cassettes of their music. Sales of 5,000 copies of an EP brought interest from Hollywood rock manager James Jeda, who brought the band out of obscurity by signing them with Portrait Records, the hard rock imprint of Sony's Columbia label. Scott and Kennison completed the band's lineup with the addition of drummer Josh Memolo and bassist John Moyer.

The Union Underground released its debut album, ...An Education in Rebellion, on July 18, 2000. The disc spent four months on the charts and the track "Turn Me On 'Mr. Deadman'" was on the mainstream rock charts for six months. After two years, the album's sales reportedly stood at 350,000. The band opened for Marilyn Manson in the fall of 2000 and earned a slot on the 2001 Ozzfest tour.

In March 2002, The Union Underground released the song "Across the Nation" which was used by the World Wrestling Federation, now known as World Wrestling Entertainment, as the theme song for their RAW brand until October 2006. Following the song's release, it earned extensive airplay nationwide.

On June 25, 2002, the band released Live...One Nation Underground, a compilation of live performances. This would be their final release before Portrait folded in 2002 and The Union Underground disbanded.

Leader singer Bryan Scott teamed up with UU former manager James Jeda again in 2007 to start a new project "Cult to Follow" with an entirely new band.

=== 2002–2016: Post-Union Underground projects ===
Patrick Kennison is now working with the band Heaven Below. John Moyer is now playing bass for Disturbed. Josh Memolo became a born again Christian. He has played drums in different churches and for local bands when he can. Bryan Scott started the band Cult to Follow. In July 2015, it was announced that Scott formed a side project called Into the Fire with Tim King (bass) and Adam Zadel (guitar) from the band SOiL and also features Will Hunt of Evanescence on drums. Into the Fire released a self-titled EP on September 30, 2016.

=== 2016–present: Reformation and upcoming second studio album ===
In early 2016, Scott announced via the band's Facebook page that a new lineup and music would be available that summer, with a sample of a track ("False Caterpillars") available for 24 hours only. Later in the year it was announced that an EP would be released in 2017. In 2018, a video announcing that new album details were 'coming soon' appeared on the band's YouTube channel. But no official release has surfaced yet.

On February 4, 2020, the band announced that they would play the entirety of their debut album ...An Education in Rebellion in full, along with songs from the upcoming album, at the Aztec Theatre in San Antonio, Texas, on July 18, but the show was canceled due to Covid-19.

On August 23, 2023, the band announced that they would be embarking on the "Back to the 2000s" tour with SOiL, Ra and Flaw.

On July 10, 2025, they embarked on a co-headlining tour with Spineshank for the 25 Years of Rebellion and Callousness Tour, consisting of 2 legs. The first of which featured support by Adema and Sicksense with 16 dates in Texas, Arkansas, Ohio, Illinois, Wisconsin, Nebraska and Colorado. The 2nd leg (with support from Julien K & Carbonstone) consisting of 14 dates in Louisiana, Alabama, South Carolina, New Jersey, Pennsylvania, New York, Connecticut, Virginia, Kentucky, Illinois, South Dakota and Kansas.

== Members ==
Current

- Bryan Scott – lead vocals (1996–2002, 2016–present)
- Todd "Taz" Osterhouse – guitar, backing vocals (2017–present)
- Elias "Bones" Andra – drums, backing vocals (2023–present)
- Ilyn Nathaniel – bass (2024–present)

Former

- Patrick Kennison – guitar, backing vocals (1996–2002)
- John Moyer – bass, backing vocals (1996–2002)
- Josh Memelo – drums (1996–2002, 2017)
- Troy Doebbler – bass (2017–2022)
- Jason West – drums (2017–2022)
- Robin C. Lopez – drums (2022–2023)
- Mike "Metal Mike" Lopez – bass (2022–2023)
- Diego "Ashes" Ibarra – bass, backing vocals (2023–2024)

== Discography ==
=== Studio albums ===
List of studio albums
Title	Details
...An Education in Rebellion	Released: 2000; Label: Columbia Records

=== Other releases ===
List of other releases
Title	Details
The Union Underground EP	Released: 1997; Label: Union Records
Live...One Nation Underground	Released: 2002; Label: Portrait Records

=== Charted singles ===
Year	Song	Peak chart positions	Album
Year	Song	US Main. Rock	Album
2000	"Turn Me On 'Mr. Deadman'"	11	...An Education in Rebellion
2001	"Killing the Fly"	17	...An Education in Rebellion
2001	"Revolution Man"	26	...An Education in Rebellion
2002	"Across the Nation"	29	WWF Forceable Entry

Radio promotion CDs

- Rebellion (2000)
- Killing the Fly (2000)
- Live – Club Laga, Pittsburgh, PA 2000-07-29 (2000)
- Turn Me On Mr. Deadman (2001)
- South Texas Deathride (2001)
- Revolution Man (2001)
- Across the Nation (2002)

Soundtrack appearances

- "South Texas Deathride" on Ozzfest 2001: The Second Millennium
- "Across the Nation" on WWF Forceable Entry
