= Nikki Stringfield =

American guitarist

- Stringfield in 2021

Background information
- Also known as: Davina Murray
- Born: 1990 (age 35–36); Red Oak, Texas, U.S.
- Genre: Heavy metal
- Occupation: Guitarist
- Years active: 2012–present
- Label: Independent
- Member of: Iron Maidens; Heaven Below
- Formerly of: Before the Mourning; Femme Fatale
- Website: Nikki Stringfield on Facebook

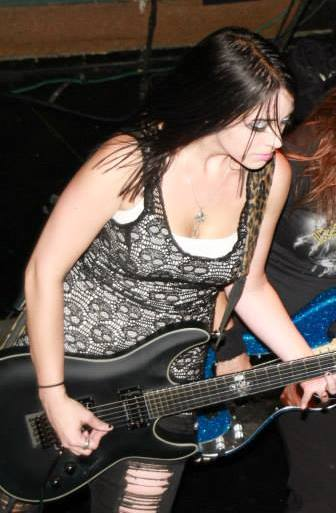
Stringfield performing in 2013

Nikki Stringfield (born 1990) is an American heavy metal musician. She is the current guitarist for The Iron Maidens and Heaven Below, as well as the former guitarist for Femme Fatale and Before the Mourning.

== Early life ==
Born in 1990 in Red Oak, Texas, Stringfield attended Red Oak High School and graduated in 2008. She studied at The University of Texas in Austin, graduating in 2012 with a degree in Radio/TV/Film.

== Career ==
After an internship with Warner Brothers Music Stringfield moved to Los Angeles in January 2012 and became part of American melodic metal bands Before the Mourning and The Iron Maidens.

In 2014, Stringfield and Before the Mourning parted ways, after which time Stringfield joined Femme Fatale in May 2015. In September 2015, The Iron Maidens brought the former guest guitarist on as a settled member for the ensemble. Stringfield and The Iron Maidens vocalist Kirsten Rosenberg appeared as contestants on the August 3, 2017, episode of the music game show Beat Shazam.

In 2017, Stringfield released music videos for her solo singles "Save Our Souls" and "As Chaos Consumes", followed by "Heart Shaped Box" in 2018.

In late 2018, Stringfield became a touring guitarist for American rock band Heaven Below. In January 2019, she announced that she plans to release her debut solo EP some time that year. In July 2019, the singer announced the title of the album, Harmonies for the Haunted, with a September 2019 announcement that she expects to release the album on October 30, 2019. On October 18, 2019, Stringfield debuted "When the Devil Comes Down", her first single from the EP.

In March 2021, the singer announced that she is working on a full-length studio album.

On Sundays in February 2022, Stringfield and Heaven Below lead vocalist/Lita Ford guitarist Patrick Kennison performed during their residency at Hard Rock Cafe in Hollywood, California.

On 26 June 2022, Stringfield plans to release Live in the Living Room which she created with Kennison. The two plan to perform that same date at Hard Rock Cafe in Hollywood, California.

Additionally, on the last 3 Wednesdays in July 2022, Stringfield plans to perform at the same venue, with Kennison performing on the latter two dates.

In July 2023, it was announced her debut full-length album, Apocrypha, would be released on September 29.

On 24 January 2025, Stringfield and Kennison plan to release Ghost Notes, the debut EP from the husband and wife duo. The album will coincide with the 2025 Live Drama Tour starring American heavy metal guitarist Marty Friedman.

== Personal life ==
Stringfield and Kennison married on November 4, 2022 after almost ten years of friendship and dating. The couple met in 2012 at an all-star jam night in Hollywood, California.

== Discography ==
=== Before the Mourning ===
==== EPs ====
- Remembrance (2012)
- Damned and Forsaken (2014)

==== Videos ====
- "Before the Mourning" (2012)

=== Solo career ===
==== Studio albums ====
- Live in the Living Room (with Patrick Kennison)(2022)
- Apocrypha (2023)

==== EPs ====
- Harmonies for the Haunted (2019)
- Ghost Notes (with Patrick Kennison) (2025)

==== Singles ====
- "Sally's Song" (2016)
- "As Chaos Consumes" (2017)
- "Save Our Souls" (2017)
- "Heart Shaped Box" (2018)
- "When the Devil Comes Down" (2019)
