= A Search for Reason =

Studio album by Kilgore
- Released: May 12, 1998
- Recorded: Castle Oaks (Calabasas, CA)
- Genre: Alternative metal, nu metal, post-grunge
- Length: 43:10
- Label: Revolution Records
- Producer: Ed Stasium

Kilgore chronology
Blue Collar Solitude (1995)	A Search for Reason (1998)

Professional ratings
Review scores
Source	Rating
AllMusic	4/5 stars

A Search for Reason is the second studio album by American heavy metal band Kilgore. It was released on May 12, 1998, through Revolution Records. It is considered an impressive step forward for the band. The album blends styles drawing from hardcore punk, metal and post-alternative industrial and grunge.

== Background ==
The album was the first and final album released under the name Kilgore. The previous release, Blue Collar Solitude, was released when the band was still called Kilgore Smudge. The album features some songwriting credits to guitarist Brian McKenzie, who had left the band before the release of A Search for Reason. The song "TK-421" is a reference to a Star Wars Stormtrooper.

== Track listing ==
No.	Title	Music	Length
1.	"Steamroller"	Jay Berndt, Steve Johnson, Mike Pelletier, Bill Southerland	2:11
2.	"Avowal"	Jay Berndt, Steve Johnson, Mike Pelletier, Bill Southerland	3:45
3.	"Introverted"	Jay Berndt, Steve Johnson, Brian McKenzie, Mike Pelletier, Bill Southerland	3:35
4.	"In Medias Res"	Jay Berndt, Steve Johnson, Mike Pelletier, Bill Southerland	3:51
5.	"Never Again"	Jay Berndt, Steve Johnson, Mike Pelletier, Bill Southerland	3:40
6.	"Lullaby for Your Casket"	Jay Berndt, Steve Johnson, Brian McKenzie, Mike Pelletier, Bill Southerland	3:18
7.	"Prayers for the Dying"	Jay Berndt, Steve Johnson, Mike Pelletier, Bill Southerland	3:13
8.	"Providence"	Jay Berndt, Steve Johnson, Mike Pelletier, Bill Southerland	4:32
9.	"Drop the Hammer"	Jay Berndt, Steve Johnson, Brian McKenzie, Mike Pelletier, Bill Southerland	2:14
10.	"TK 421" (featuring Burton C. Bell)	Jay Berndt, Steve Johnson, Brian McKenzie, Mike Pelletier, Bill Southerland	4:27
11.	"Double-Edged Sword"	Jay Berndt, Steve Johnson, Mike Pelletier, Bill Southerland	3:22
12.	"X"	Jay Berndt, Steve Johnson, Mike Pelletier, Bill Southerland	5:02
Total length:			43:10

== Personnel ==
- Jay Berndt – lead vocals
- Bill Southerland – drums
- Steve Johnson – bass
- Mike Pelletier – lead guitar
