= Heaven Below =

American rock band

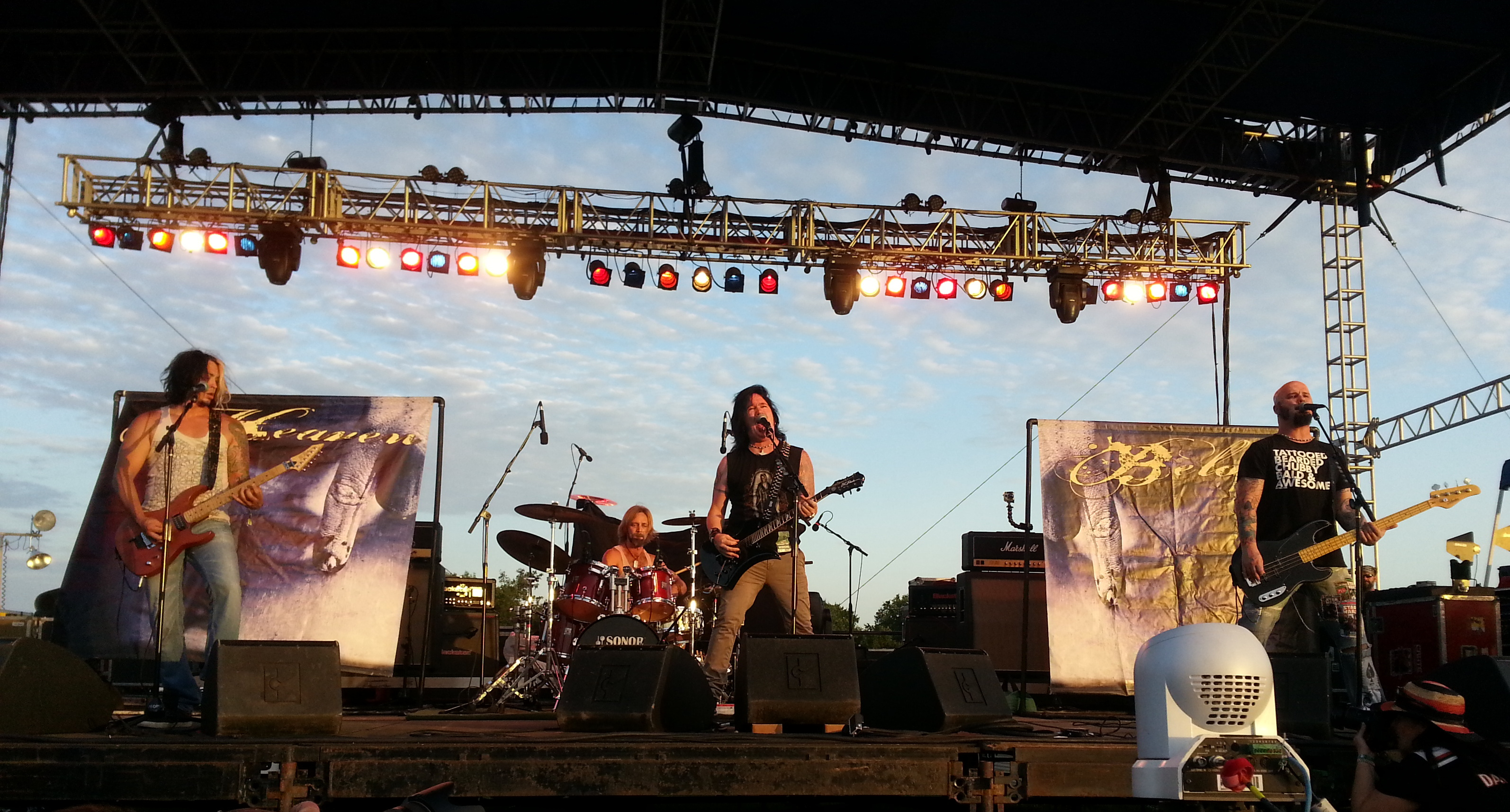
- Heaven Below in 2014

Background information
- Also known as: HB
- Origin: Los Angeles, California, U.S.
- Genres: Hard rock, heavy metal
- Years active: 2008–present
- Label: Independent
- Members: Patrick Kennison; Nikki Stringfield; John Younger; Shad Wilhelm
- Past members: Chad Clark; Marty O'Brien; Dave Comer; Elias Andra; Jesse Billson; Lucas Kanopa
- Website: heavenbelow.com

Heaven Below is an American hard rock band based in Los Angeles. The band's debut album Countdown to Devil was released March 2009.

== History ==
The band was formed in late 2007 by Patrick Kennison (Union Underground), Marty O'Brien (Disturbed, We Are the Fallen) and session drummer Chad Clark to film a video for Kennison's song "The Laughing Dead". In 2008 guitarist Dave Comer was added completing the quartet. Later that year Comer and O'Brien were replaced by guitarist Jesse Billson and bassist John Younger respectively.

=== Countdown to Devil ===
Following the release of Countdown to Devil, the group completed its first tour in mid-2009 dubbed the "Texas Takeover Tour". Media coverage of the tour included a live performance on FOX-TV in San Antonio, TX.

In August 2010, the band released a self-titled EP, and led a tour dubbed the "Horns and Halos Tour" which spanned over much of the country and even Canada. Before "The Mirror Never Lies" was released, Chad Clark left the band and was replaced by Julien-K and Dead by Sunrise drummer Elias Andra.

=== Falling from Zero ===
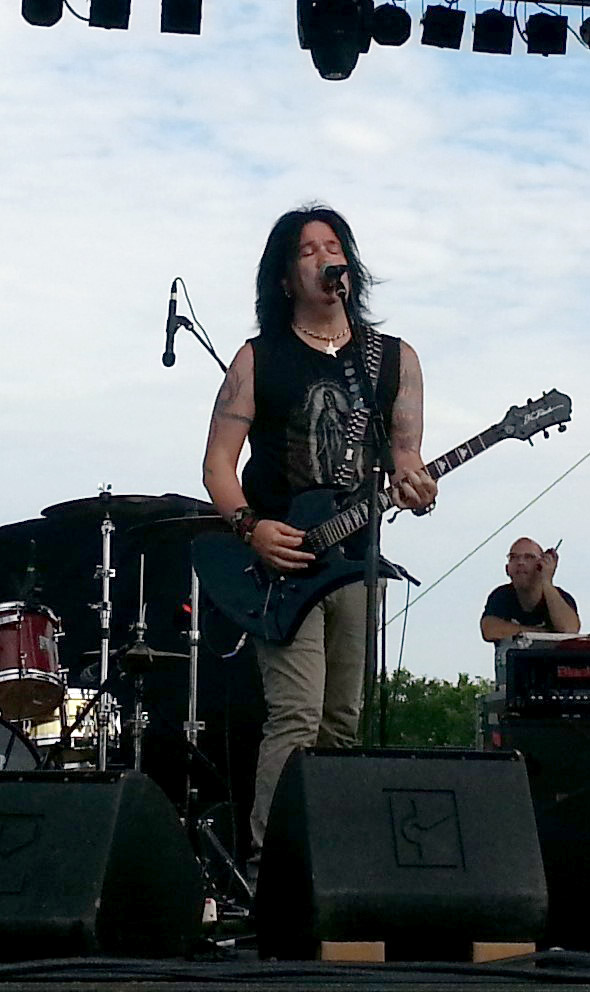
Patrick Kennison

In 2012, the band released their second studio album Falling from Zero followed in 2013 by compilation album Dos Diablos Digital Box Set, acoustic album The Deadlight Sessions and cover album Sleeping Giants. It was during the same year that percussionist Shad Wilhelm joined the ensemble, replacing Andra.

In the year following, the group advertised their limited edition coffin kits, containing an album entitled Demonic Demos & Unsung Lullabies. The CD, which contained previously unreleased tunes, an electric version of "Damaged" (published in 2013 on The Deadlight Sessions) as well as a cover of "Nothing Else Matters" by Metallica was made available exclusively in the coffin kit.

=== Good Morning Apocalypse ===
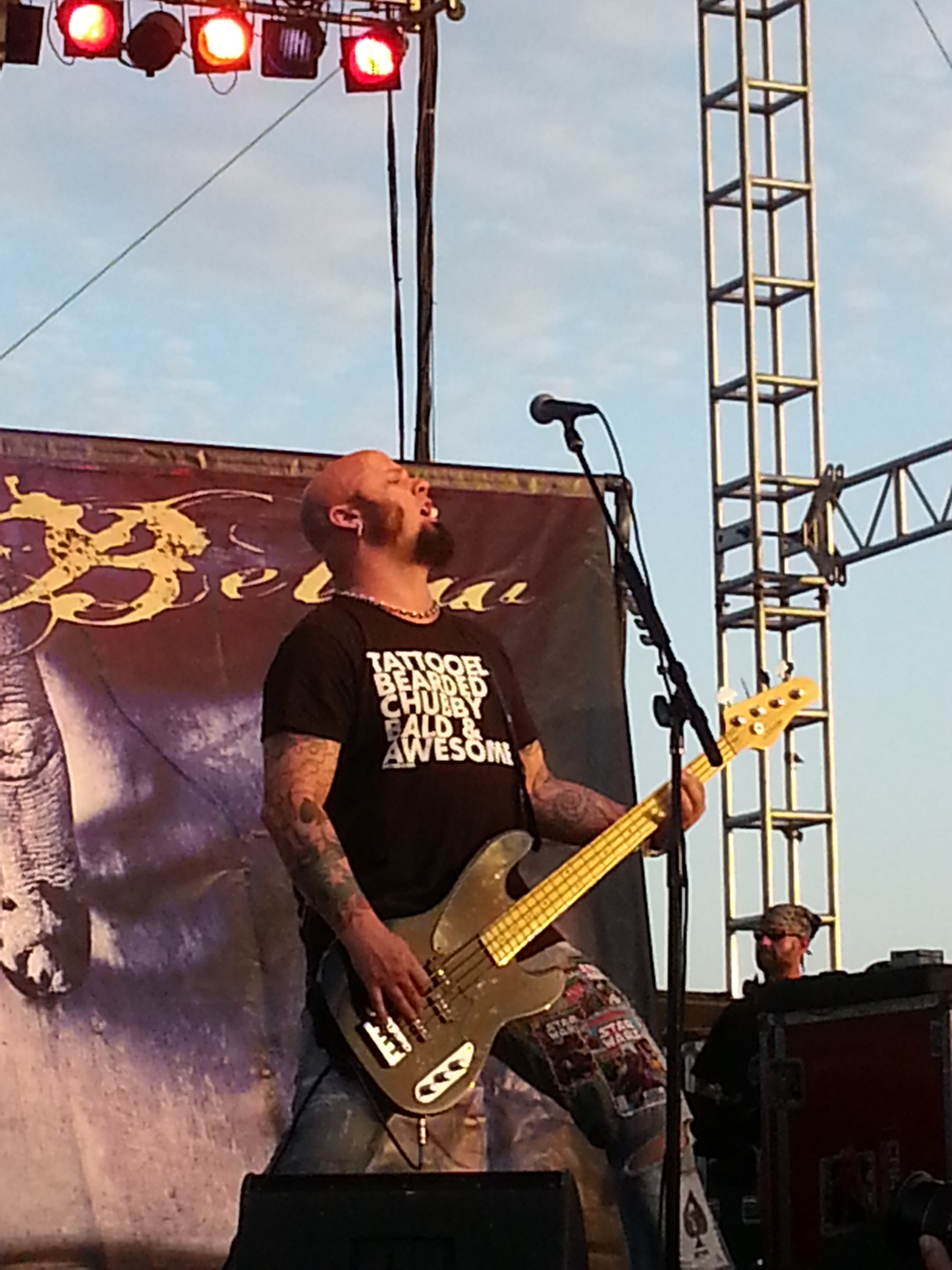
John Younger

In 2014, the band began working on what is to be their third studio album. In January 2015, the group posted a photograph on their internet site with the words Good Morning Apocalypse, the title of their upcoming work.

Some time after mid-2014, Billson left the ensemble, with Lucas Kanopa replacing him some time later.

The band released the album on October 14, 2016.

In late 2018, Nikki Stringfield of American rock bands The Iron Maidens and Femme Fatale became a touring guitarist for the ensemble.

In April 2020, Kennison announced the release date of May 17, 2020, for upcoming cover album Rest in Pieces.

On Sundays in February 2022, Stringfield and Kennison performed during their residency at Hard Rock Cafe in Hollywood, California.

=== The Majestic Twelve ===
In late 2024, the ensemble plans to release The Majestic Twelve, their fourth studio album. The album was released on July 22, 2025.

== Members ==
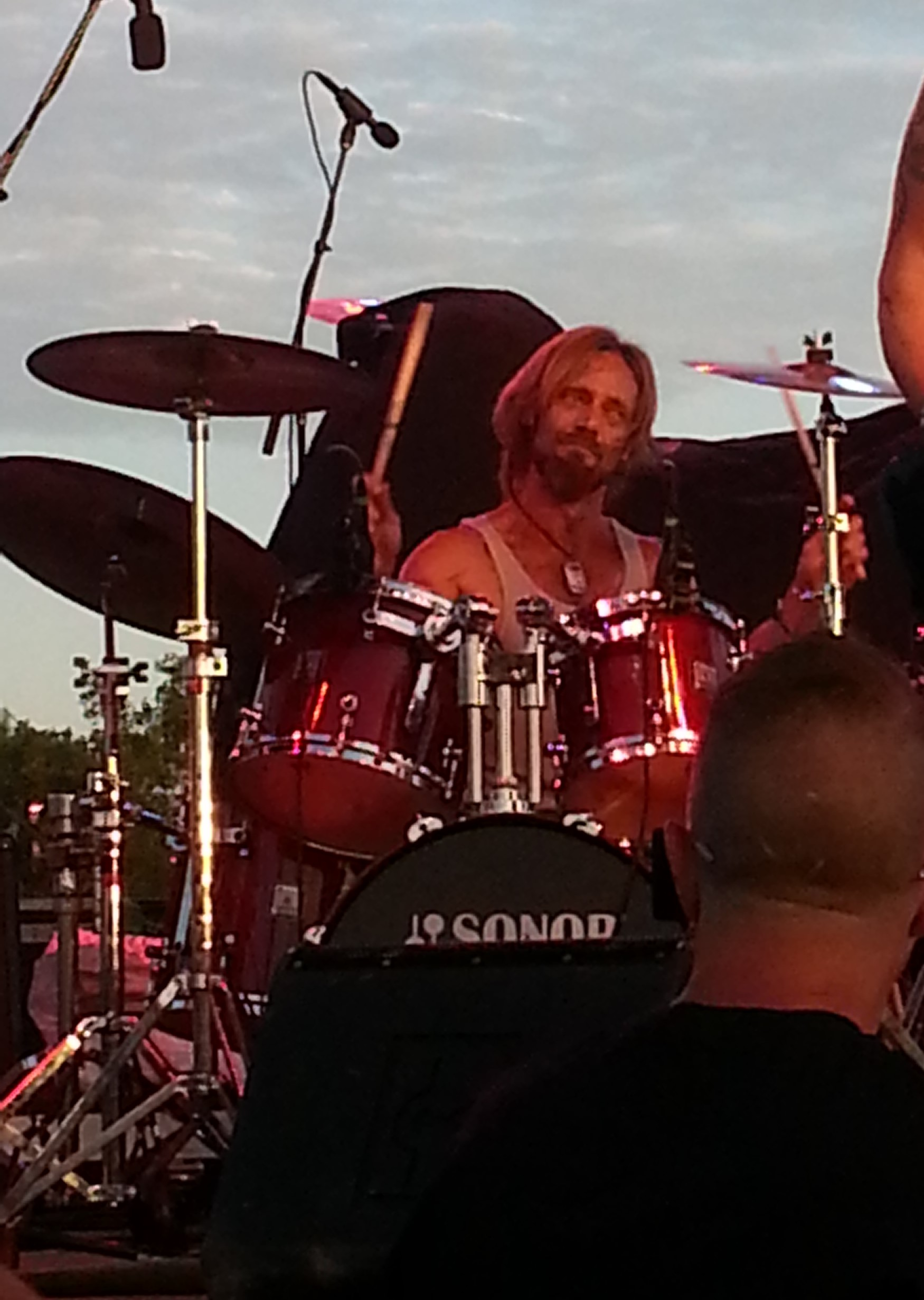
Shad Wilhelm

- Patrick Kennison (vocals/guitars)
- Nikki Stringfield (guitars)
- John Younger (bass)
- Shad Wilhelm (drums)

== Discography ==
=== Studio albums ===
- Countdown to Devil (2009)
- Falling From Zero (2012)
- Good Morning Apocalypse (2016)
- The Majestic Twelve (2025)
- Alternate Abductions (2026)

=== Other albums ===
- We Sold Our Soul for Heaven Below (2008)
- Infamy (EP) (2008)
- Reworking the Devil (2009)
- Heaven Below (2010)
- Unleashed in the West (2011)
- The Mirror Never Lies: Mega-Single (2011)
- Dos Diablos Digital Box Set (2013)
- The Deadlight Sessions (2013)
- Sleeping Giants (2013)
- Demonic Demos & Unsung Lullabies (2014)
- Rest in Pieces (2020)

=== Songs ===
- "Major Tom (Coming Home)" - originally released in 1982 by Peter Schilling.
- "Twilight Zone" - originally released in 1982 by Golden Earring. This track was never officially released. After the release of their self-titled EP, all who bought a copy were able to download Twilight Zone from the internet through a special disc feature.
- "Heartbreaker" - originally released by Pat Benatar in 1979.
- "Subdivisions" - originally released by Rush in 1982. Featuring William Shatner speaking "Subdivisions" as well as "Attention all planets of the solar federation - we have assumed control" from the song 2112.
