= Before the Mourning =

American heavy metal band

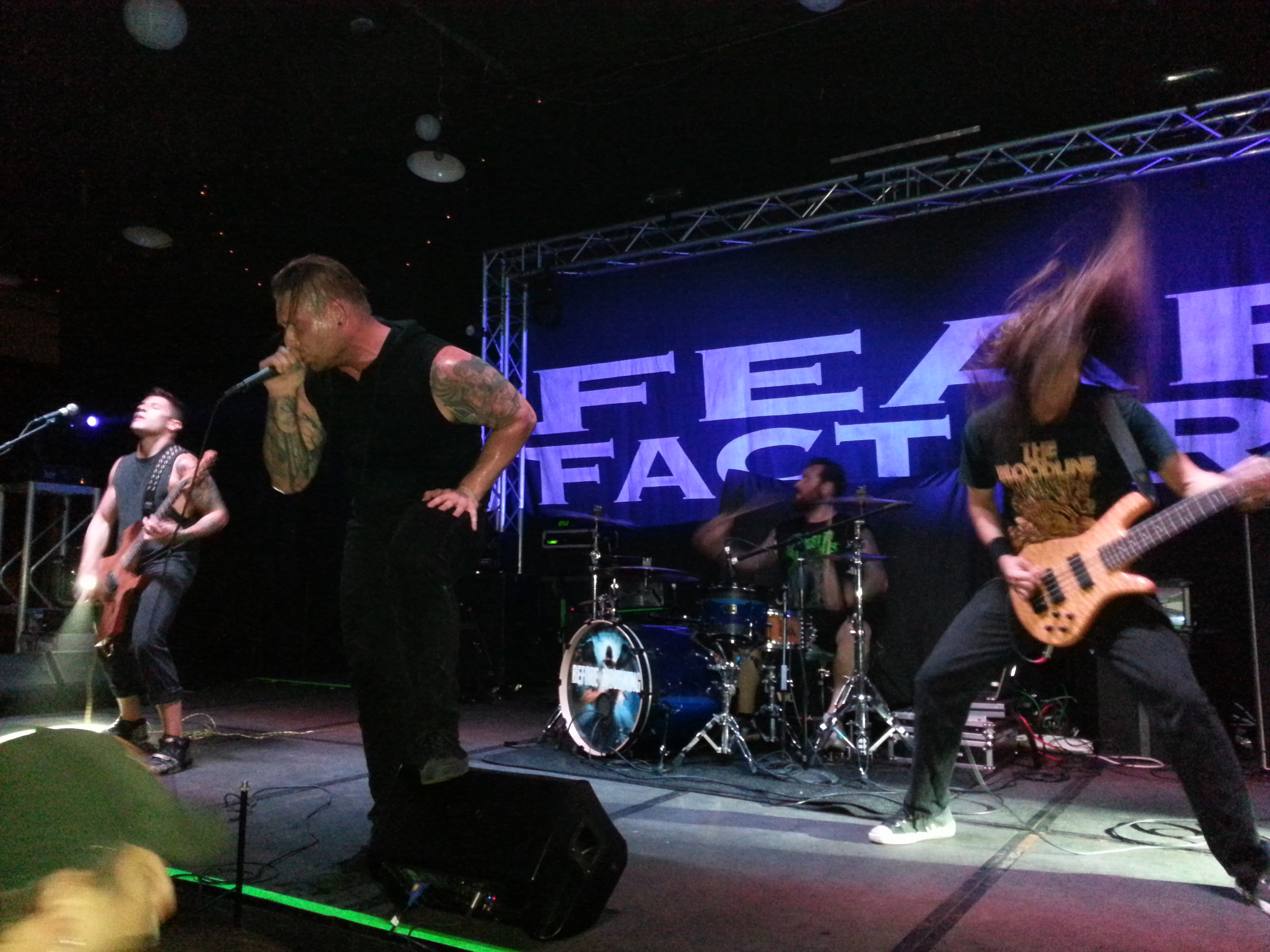
- Before the Mourning performing in 2015

Background information
- Also known as: B4TM
- Origin: Los Angeles, California, U.S.
- Genres: Heavy metal, thrash metal
- Years active: 2012–2015
- Label: Street Smart Recordings
- Past members: Phil Gonyea; Adam Ryan; CJ Cussell; Johnny Young; Vincent Ferro; Kyle Mayer; Paul McBride; Jeff Stevenson; Nikki Stringfield
- Website: Before the Mourning on Facebook

Before the Mourning (also initialized as B4TM) was an American heavy metal band from Los Angeles. They released two EPs, Remembrance and Damned and Forsaken, and published the full-length album Etherial End in August 2015. In November 2015, the band announced that they had permanently split up.

== History ==
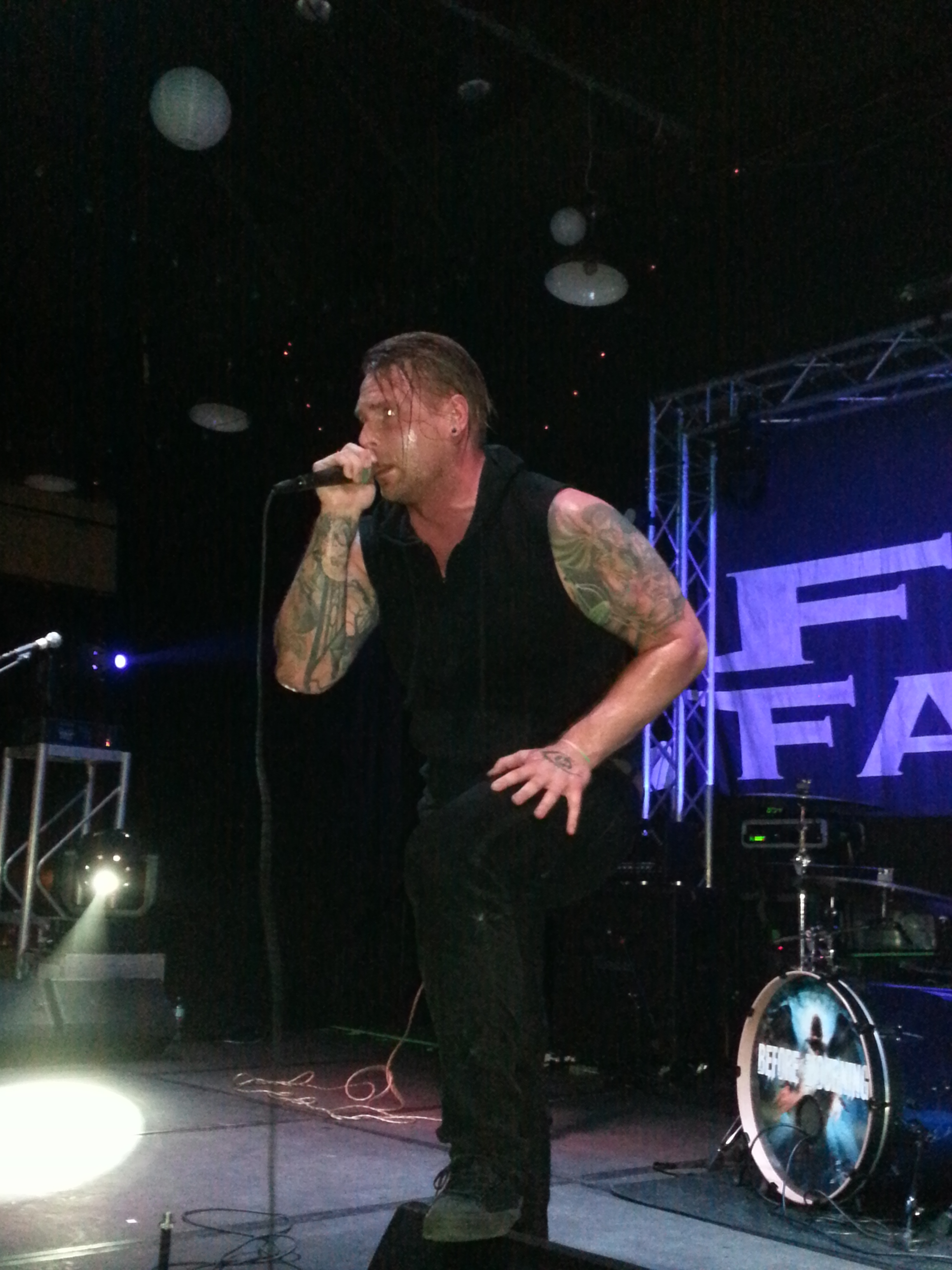
Adam Ryan

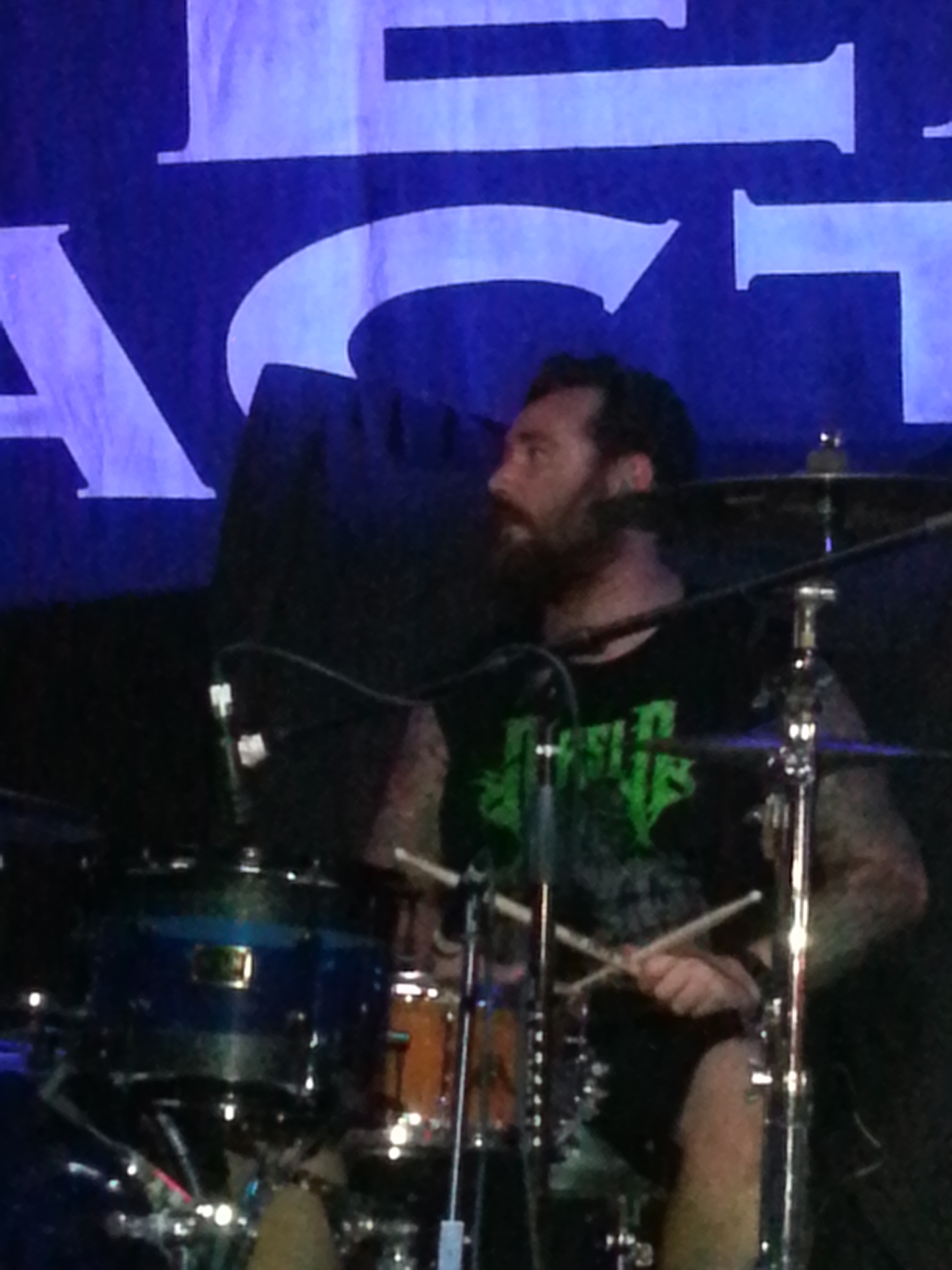
Phil Gonyea

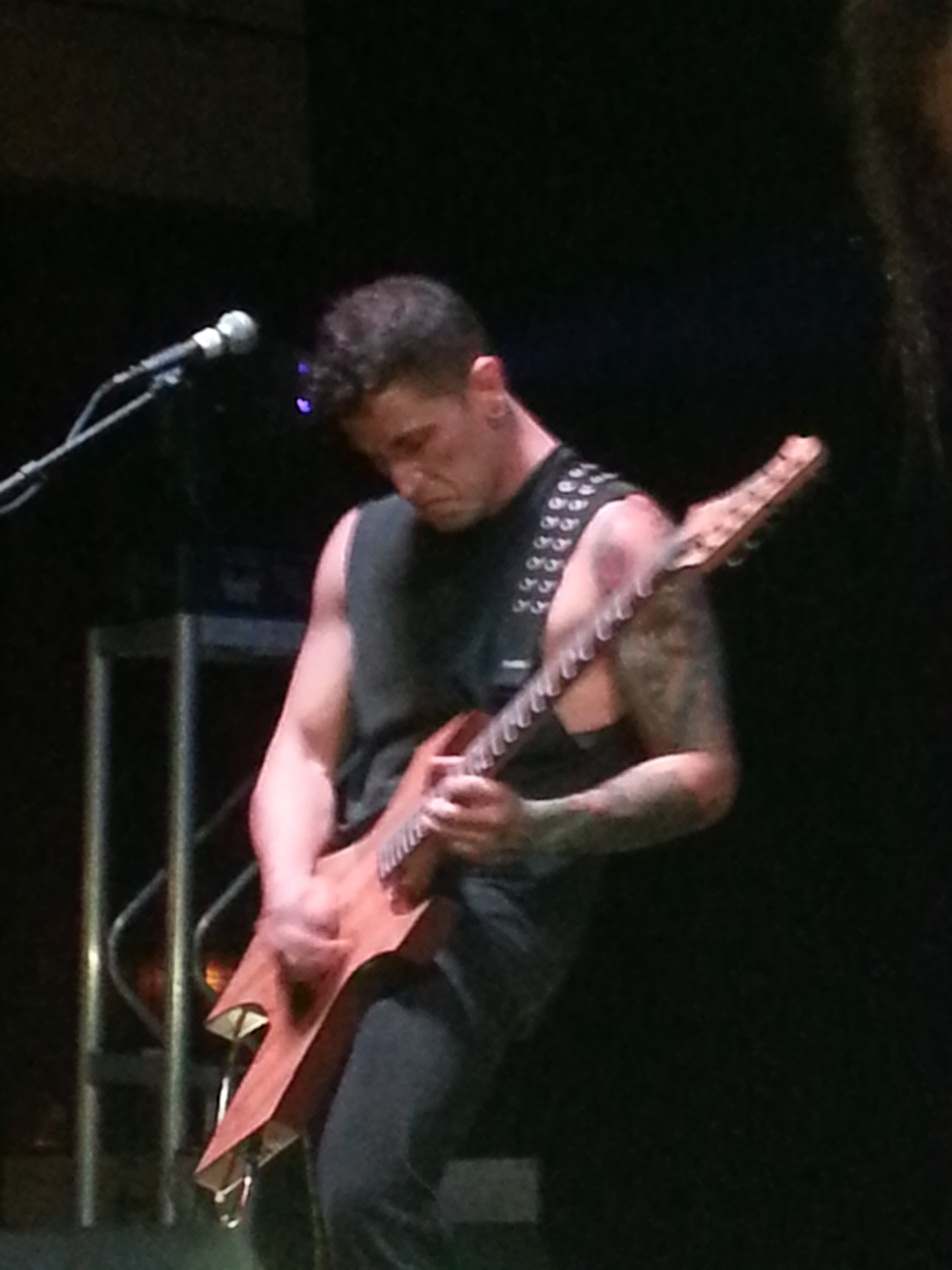
CJ Cussell

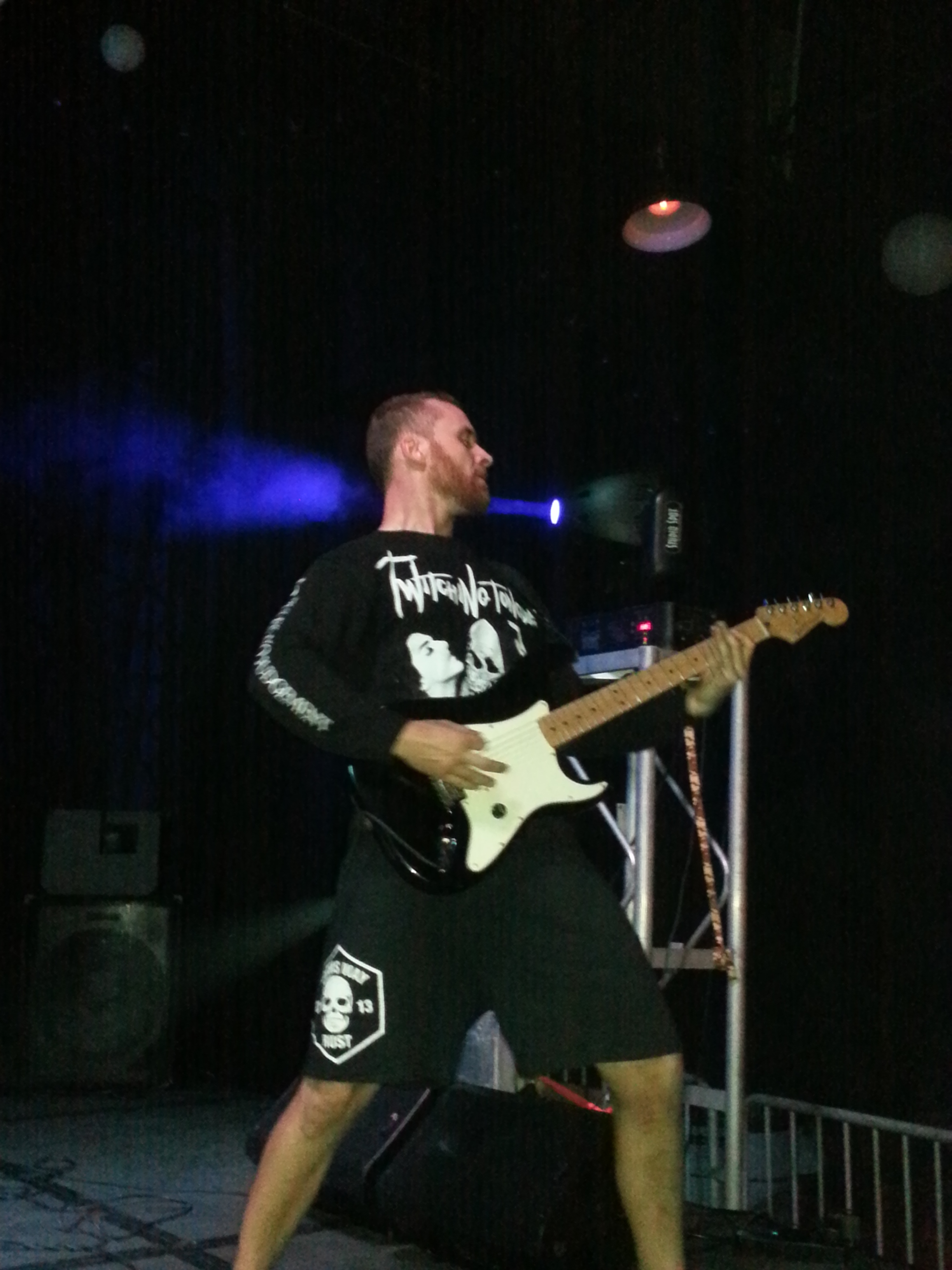
Jeff Stevenson

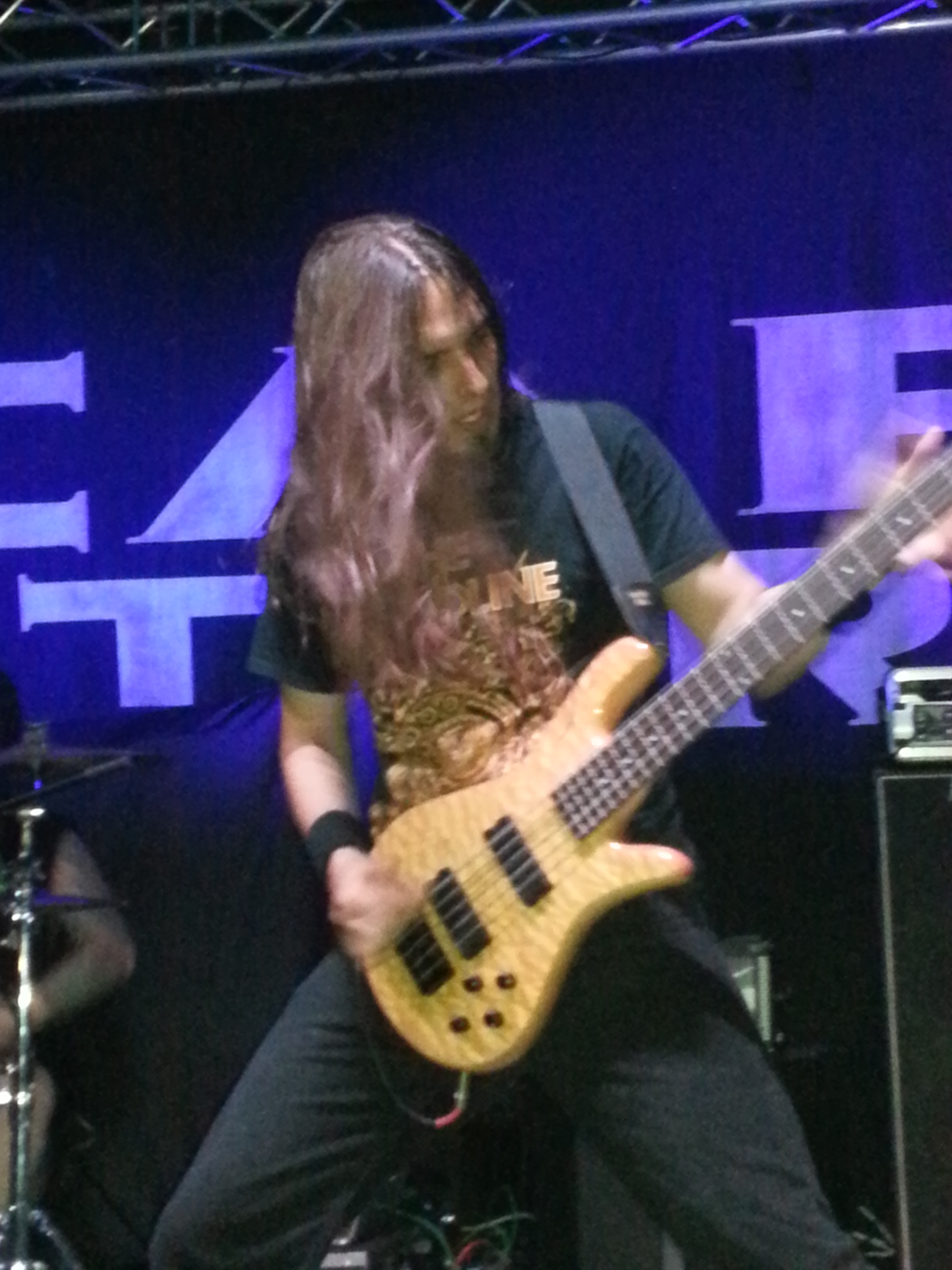
Paul McBride

=== Remembrance (2011–2013) ===
In December 2011, Phillip Gonyea, the former percussionist for bands Instinct of Aggression and Against All Will approached Johnny Young of The Kill Corps about performing music. Because the sessions proved to be successful, Adam Ryan, who also performed with The Kill Corps, was brought in to sing, after which time their first track "Dismember" was recorded. Weeks later, the band met guitarist Nikki Stringfield, at which time Before the Mourning began. In August 2012, their first EP, named Remembrance, was released free of charge via Facebook.

The song "Dead to You" is described by Young as being "breakup music for tough guys", focusing on "a relationship that can't work no matter how hard you try". The lyric video for this song was released on September 6, 2012. "Before the Mourning", the title track from the album, talks about "focus[ing] on the good times" had with someone that people have lost, "the double entendre within the band name". The music video for this song was released on January 17, 2013.

=== Damned and Forsaken (2013–2014) ===
Halfway through 2013, the band began work on their second EP, entitled Damned and Forsaken. At the end of July, the band released the title track via their ReverbNation page, followed by "Grim" in early August. In the week following, the ensemble then published "The Right to Die" as well as demo "Need to Bleed".

In early 2014, the band performed on The Hell Pop Tour II with In This Moment, Butcher Babies, Devour the Day, and All Hail the Yeti. Following the tour, Stringfield and the ensemble parted ways.

=== Etherial End (2014–2015) ===
In June 2014, a lyric video was debuted for "Another Sleepless Night", with "Continuum" published via SoundCloud just over two months later. The ensemble, along with American rock band Malaki then visited the western United States for their "Pacific Rim Tour".

To begin 2015, the group released the official music video for "Another Sleepless Night", directed by Kevin J. Custer. At the end of July 2015, the ensemble released "The Deception", the third tune from the album. The song is about an abnormal love triangle confounded by the deceptions used by all of the individuals involved. The band made the decision to open the album with "The Deception", as the "happy sounding intro is a complete 180 from the rest of the track" which "drops into a heavy driving groove which doesn't let up".

In mid-August, a new song entitled "Honestly" was released via ArtistDirect. According to Ryan, the tune is "about that time in your life when you come to a crossroads", "that time when you can either keep on living the way you've been living, or make the choice to be something better". The singer goes on to say that "even then, you still struggle with your inner demons who try and convince you that you've made the wrong choice".

In late July, the group announced that their debut full-length album entitled Etherial End would be available on August 21, 2015. Co-produced by Logan Mader, the work was released via Street Smart Recordings. From August until September 2015, the ensemble toured with Fear Factory, Once Human, and Chicago rock band The Bloodline.

On November 7, 2015, it was announced that Ryan and the band had parted ways. Seventeen days later, on November 24, 2015, it was announced that the ensemble had permanently split up.

=== Post-breakup (2015–present) ===
Lead guitarist CJ Cussell performs with bands Corrosion and Forty Winters. Phil Gonyea returned to his old ensemble Instinct of Aggression. Bassist Paul McBride has continued to perform in Florida rock band The Killing Hours. Lead vocalist Adam Ryan started three new musical projects, A Callous Confession, Valor & Vengeance and Alphamega.

== Critical reception ==
Jason Rhode of Cryptic Rock describes debut album Etherial End as "a high-octane soundtrack of raw emotion". Rhode goes on to say that "The Deception" has a "melodic intro that is deceptively Alternative Pop akin to Sheryl Crow's "All I Wanna Do" with "speedy drums kick[ing] in, accompanied by Cussell and Stevenson's guitars". The reviewer then talks about "Another Sleepless Night", a track that discusses the end of one of Ryan's relationships and his self-medicating to cope, then returning the listener to hard metal as the guitars fade and the drums kick. Rhode concludes by stating that the band "is precise like a striking cobra with the elegance of a panther, musically and vocally" and that "each track is like Christmas; as they unfold, the beauty within is seen". Jeff Kendrick, DevilDriver guitarist and co-founder of All Axess describes the band as "very comfortable in their own shoes they blend perfectly delectable riffs and heaviness with cathartic screams and vibrant choruses", going on to portray them as a "very promising band with what we're sure is a vibrant future ahead".

BraveWords stated that the band "definitely understand[s] their roots", and that "Possessing a timeless grasp on melody, propensity for airtight riffs, and emotionally palpable vocals, they deliver technical, taught, and tough metal that's as memorable as it is magnetic".

Alice Roques of Rock Revolt Magazine gave Etherial End "4.5 skulls", describing it as "an album that showcases everything this band can accomplish, and more", going on to say that Etherial End is a record that should be absorbed and reabsorbed" and that "A listener should put their ears on it and become one with it, because it is powerful and has all the intricacies that a musical enthusiast can dissect and savor over and over again."

Anthony Giles of The Pit: Sports & Entertainment and The Oakland Post describes the composition as "intricate, with enough punch to draw new faces into the scene" being a "hard-hitting mixture of chugging breakdowns, bass drops, loud and angry screams, and some heartfelt, mid-tone clean vocals".

Bill Jolliemore of National Rock Review describes the work as bass and drums that "snake from simple to complex time signatures with a mix of straight forward and syncopated beats providing a solid foundation", with guitars "adding layers of chugging rhythm, and slow to shredding melodic leads". Jolliemore goes on to say that "the technical, galloping, and helicopter like drums will challenge even the most experienced air drumming metal heads out there".

== Personnel ==
=== Final lineup ===
- Phil Gonyea – drums (2011–2015)
- Adam Ryan – vocals (2012–2015)
- Christopher "CJ" Cussell – lead guitar (2013–2015)
- Paul McBride – bass (2014–2015)
- Jeff Stevenson – rhythm guitar (2014–2015)

=== Former members ===
- Johnny Young – lead guitar (2011–2013)
- Vincent Ferro – bass (2012)
- Kyle Mayer – bass (2013)
- Nikki Stringfield – rhythm guitar (2012–2014)

== Discography ==
=== Studio albums ===
- Etherial End (2015)

=== EPs ===
- Remembrance (2012)
- Damned and Forsaken (2014)

=== Videos ===
- "Before the Mourning" (2012)
- "Another Sleepless Night" (2014)

== Other information ==
Bassist Paul McBride is an editor for Bass Musician Magazine and also performs with American heavy metal band The Killing Hours from Miami, Florida.
