= The Mirror Never Lies (song) =

Single by Heaven Below

from the album Falling From Zero
- Released: September 6, 2011
- Genre: Rock
- Length: 13:14
- Songwriters: Patrick Kennison; Jesse Billson

"The Mirror Never Lies" is a single from rock band Heaven Below. The Mirror Never Lies: Mega-Single composition, consisting of three versions of the song "The Mirror Never Lies" (the theme song for Children Without a Voice), was released on September 6, 2011.

== Background ==
Elias Andra, the drummer for the band informed the quartet that there are organizations that embrace new bands and support causes in which the ensemble believes. In 2011, the ensemble teamed up with Papa Roach, Filter, Black Veil Brides, Three Days Grace in addition to other bands to create awareness for Children Without a Voice, an organization whose mission is to fight bullying and crimes against children. A percentage of the sales revenue from the work was donated to the organization.

== Music video ==
The music video for "The Mirror Never Lies" was filmed in Lancaster, California.

== Release ==
In 2012, the album version of song "The Mirror Never Lies" was featured on the band's sophomore studio album Falling From Zero. The Mirror Never Lies: Mega-Single was included with the purchase of the CD version of Falling From Zero.

== Critical reception ==
Jon Ondrashek of Target Audience Magazine stated that the piano version of the song "illuminates Kennison’s raw vocal strength". Yvonne Laughlin of Yvonne's World describes the video as "a well done portrayal of violence in the home whether emotional or physical" with Shaunna O'Donnell of Muen Magazine calling the album version of the song "as hard edged as the subject".

== Track listing ==
1. The Mirror Never Lies [Album Version] - 3:59
2. The Mirror Never Lies [Piano/Vocal] - 4:08
3. The Mirror Never Lies [Bawlz Deep In the 8-I-8 Mega Dubstep Remix] - 3:55
4. Message From Heaven Below - 1:12
