= The Deadlight Sessions =

EP by Heaven Below
- Released: August 13, 2013
- Genre: Rock
- Length: 31:20
- Label: Broken Halo Media

Heaven Below chronology
Heaven Below (2010)	The Deadlight Sessions (2013)

The Deadlight Sessions is an EP from American rock band Heaven Below. The album was released on August 13, 2013 through Broken Halo Media.

== Composition ==
The album takes a more acoustic approach than previous albums. This was done due to the success of the acoustic version of their song "When Daylight Dies". The fourth track from the album "The Needle Lies Again" was written about Paul Gray from Slipknot, who died in 2010 of a drug overdose. The song talks about the overwhelming feeling of hurt and anxiety that exists when having to deal with the death of a close companion.

== Touring ==
In September 2013, the band went to Hooligan's Bar & Grill in New Braunfels, Texas near San Antonio for a one stop show to promote the album.

== Critical reception ==
Sweet Lou of The Heavy Metal ICU states that "Tomorrow Never Comes" is "close to sounding very Motley Crue 'If I Die Tomorrow'".

== Track listing ==
1. Tomorrow Never Comes - 4:39
2. Damaged - 3:25
3. Bleed the Sky - 4:19
4. The Needle Lies Again - 5:16
5. Between the Truth - 3:31
6. The End of Days - 3:40
7. No More Heroes - 6:30
