= Apocrypha (album) =

Studio album by Nikki Stringfield
- Released: September 29, 2023
- Genre: Heavy metal
- Length: 55:06
- Label: Independent
- Producer: Patrick Kennison

Nikki Stringfield chronology
Harmonies for the Haunted (2019)	Apocrypha (2023)

Apocrypha is the debut studio album by American heavy metal musician Nikki Stringfield. It was released on September 29, 2023.

== Production ==
Unlike Harmonies for the Haunted, Stringfield employed a full musical ensemble. The quartet consisted of Stringfield on guitar and vocals, Patrick Kennison on guitar and studio bass, Jesse Davidson on live bass and Shad Wilhelm on percussion.

== Critical reception ==
Todd Jolicoeur of 100% ROCK MAGAZINE stated that "Stringfield has unleashed a solo record unlike most from other six-string slingers… she takes the lead behind the guitar and the mic" and that "'Where the Demons Lie' is a straight forward rocker that features some churning and chugging riffs that carry the track from start to finish while Stringfield's vocals are draped perfectly across the track". Jolicoeur then adds that closing tune "Unite" "is a great end to the disc, as it prompts you to replay the whole disc again just to catch some of the other underlying nuances you may have missed".

Thomas Coffman of KNAC and Coffman Photography professed that "This album has a perfect combo of killer guitar riffs and vocals" going on to say that "The lyrics of each song are very well thought out and the music is played to perfection showing that she took her time to bring the most completed, solid result possible".

XS Rock indicated that the work is "hard rock with touches of metal featuring varied harmonies, catchy hooks and riffs, and vocals that introduce something entirely new for Stringfield" continuing to indicate that "While most know her as just a pure guitarist, this new album has allowed her to showcase not just her instrumental skills, but her writing and singing skills as well".

== Touring ==
On 28 September 2023, Stringfield performed her album release show in California. In January 2024, Stringfield plans to open in Las Vegas, Nevada for American heavy metal musician John 5.

== Track listing ==
Aprocrypha track listing
No.	Title	Length
1.	"No Surrender"	4:44
2.	"The Spell"	4:38
3.	"Where the Demons Lie"	4:41
4.	"The Outsider"	5:18
5.	"Lunacy"	4:36
6.	"Save Me"	4:34
7.	"Kiss from a Rose"	4:57
8.	"Flesh and Bones"	5:27
9.	"Wasting Away"	4:07
10.	"As Chaos Consumes"	4:32
11.	"Sweet Insanity"	6:06
12.	"Unite"	1:26
Total length:		55:06

== Personnel ==
- Nikki Stringfield - guitars, vocals
- Patrick Kennison - guitars, bass, production
- Jesse Davidson - bass
- Shad Wilhelm - percussion
