= Falling from Zero =

Falling From Zero

Studio album by Heaven Below
- Released: March 20, 2012
- Genre: Rock
- Length: 59:08
- Label: Broken Halo Media

Heaven Below chronology
Countdown to Devil (2009)	Falling From Zero (2012)	Good Morning Apocalypse (2016)

Falling From Zero is the second studio album from Los Angeles rock band Heaven Below. The album was released on March 20, 2012 via Broken Halo Media.

== Composition ==
“The Mirror Never Lies”, the fourth song on the album, is a charity single for Children Without A Voice.

"Gravity Killed The Spaceman", the ninth song on the album, recognizes David Bowie's Space Oddity while "Major Tom" is a cover of Peter Schilling's 1980s hit single paired with an original framework from the ensemble.

The video for "Dodging a Bullet", the third song on the album, was directed by Adam Hendershott and Industrialism Films. The video features the musicians reenacting Pulp Fiction.

== Release ==
The compact disc was released with 4 bonus tracks as well as The Mirror Never Lies: Mega-Single.

== Critical reception ==
Jon Ondrashek of Target Audience Magazine states that the title track “Falling From Zero” features hard percussion and scraping vocals.

== Track listing ==
=== Main album ===
1. The Last Goodbye - 1:00
2. Brutal As The Truth - 3:46
3. Dodging A Bullet - 3:27
4. The Mirror Never Lies - 3:58
5. Higher Than Heaven - 3:46
6. My Undoing - 3:26
7. Demonocracy - 4:11
8. Falling From Zero - 3:41
9. Gravity Killed The Spaceman (Pt. III of the Space Oddity, "Major Tom" trilogy) - 3:43
10. Nations Of Fire - 4:40
11. Villains Of Virtue - 3:45
12. Facing Angels - 4:36
13. Be All End All - 3:03
14. Failure Notice - 3:17
15. Legions Of The Brave/Closer (Hidden Track) - 8:49

=== CD-only bonus tracks ===
16. Higher Than Heaven (Jesus Face in The Tortilla version)
17. Dodging A Bullet (Chuck Wagon version)
18. The Mirror Never Lies (Live)
19. Heartbreaker (Live)
