= Good Morning Apocalypse =

Studio album by Heaven Below
- Released: October 14, 2016
- Genres: Hard rock, heavy metal
- Length: 56:33
- Labels: EMP Label Group eOne Entertainment

Heaven Below chronology
Falling from Zero (2012)	Good Morning Apocalypse (2016)

Singles from Good Morning Apocalypse
- 1. "Renegade Protest Movement" Released: September 5, 2016

Good Morning Apocalypse is the third studio album from American rock band Heaven Below. The concept album was released on October 14, 2016, through EMP Label Group and distributed by eOne Entertainment.

On September 5, 2016, the band released "Renegade Protest Movement", the first single from the record. On September 22, 2016, a music video for the song was published on YouTube. The album is a concept album.

== Track listing ==
No.	Title	Length
1.	"Nefarious Angels" (featuring Jason McMaster)	4:37
2.	"Renegade Protest Movement"	3:48
3.	"Follow Me Under"	3:15
4.	"Devilina and the Damage Done" (featuring Kobra Paige)	5:32
5.	"Nightfall Comes to Life"	4:40
6.	"Killing the Deadman"	4:31
7.	"Running Under Satan's Hand" (featuring Lita Ford)	3:44
8.	"Death Battalion"	3:05
9.	"Bonded by Blood"	5:53
10.	"Black Sunrise/War of the Gods" (featuring Udo Dirkschneider)	5:44
11.	"Among the Wolves/Worldwide Suicide" (featuring Mary Whitman)	5:10
12.	"I Would Do It All Again/Burials at Sunset"	6:34
Total length:		56:33
