= Marty O'Brien =

American bassist

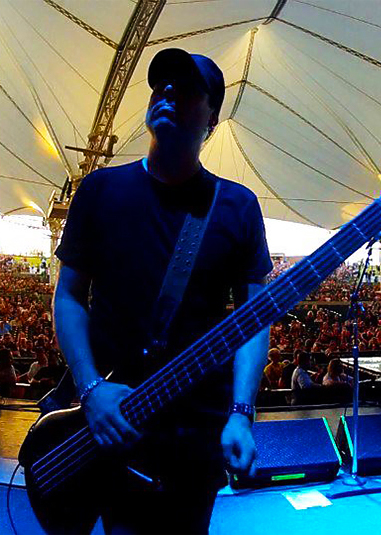
- O'Brien on tour with Lita Ford, 2012

Background information
- Born: Pawtucket, Rhode Island, U.S.
- Genres: Alternative metal, nu metal, hard rock, heavy metal, pop, R&B, pop rock, heavy metal, country
- Occupation: Musician
- Instrument: Bass guitar
- Years active: 1998–present
- Website: marty-obrien.com

Marty O'Brien is an American bassist. He plays professionally for live touring musical acts, recording sessions, television, and film scores all of which encompass a range of genres such as pop and rock, thereby collaborating with various musical artists. O'Brien's discography is generally diverse yet also maintains a notable background and standing in the hard rock and metal music genres.

O'Brien's live credits include tours with bands such as Disturbed, Tommy Lee, Static-X, Methods of Mayhem, Lita Ford, Daughtry, and Steven Adler, among others. He has performed on three different Ozzfest tours, each time with a different band (Ozzfest's 1998, 2000, 2002). Also a busy session-bassist, most of this work taking place in his current home base of Los Angeles, O'Brien has recorded with numerous artists such as Celine Dion, Chris Cornell, Brian McKnight, Tommy Lee, Jason C. Miller, Lindsay Lohan, Gus G., Lita Ford, and Kelly Clarkson.

== Early life ==
Born and raised in Pawtucket, Rhode Island, O'Brien started playing bass at the age of 13. By age 16, he had joined his first local rock band, and by 19, was playing local live shows in Providence, as well other cities along the east coast such as Boston and New York City.

== Career ==
Kilgore

O'Brien's professional career began in 1998 when a local Providence, Rhode Island–based band, Kilgore asked him to join their lineup as their new bassist. A few weeks after joining, the band embarked on the Ozzfest 98 summer festival tour, where the band shared the stage with such bands as Ozzy Osbourne, Tool, Incubus, System of a Down, Limp Bizkit, and Motörhead. Next came a North American tour supporting Slayer and Fear Factory, then a European tour in the winter, supporting Fear Factory. In January 1999, vocalist Jay Berndt quit the band, which eventually led to the end of Kilgore.

Methods of Mayhem

In April 2000, O'Brien moved to Los Angeles, and just three weeks later was asked to audition for Tommy Lee's new band Methods of Mayhem. O'Brien was offered the job the same day as the audition, and the band left for Europe eight days later and spent the summer playing some of the biggest festivals across Europe. (Dynamo Open Air, Rock Am Ring, Rock Im Park, Glastonbury Festival). Next, the band spent the rest of the summer touring the U.S. on the Ozzfest 2000 festival, sharing the main-stage with bands Ozzy Osbourne, Pantera, Godsmack, Static-X, Incubus, P.O.D., Queens of the Stone Age, and Disturbed.

Disturbed

In early 2001, the multi-platinum selling metal band Disturbed asked O'Brien to join them on tour after their bassist Steve "Fuzz" Kmak had broken his ankle in a fall from a fire escape outside the band's rehearsal complex. O'Brien spent two months playing bass for Disturbed on an extensive tour throughout Europe, opening for Marilyn Manson.

Static-X

In the summer of 2001, the multi-platinum selling band Static-X called upon O'Brien to fill-in on tour after their bassist Tony Campos had fractured his collar-bone in a motorcycle accident. After having only one rehearsal with the band, O'Brien toured with Static-X on the "Extreme Steel Tour" which also included the legendary pairing of the bands Pantera and Slayer. This would ultimately be Pantera's last tour ever.

Tommy Lee

Between 2002 and 2005, Tommy Lee recorded and released two solo albums. In 2002, Never a Dull Moment was released, on which O'Brien has a songwriting credit, and 2005's Tommyland: The Ride. From 2002 to 2005, during the promotion of both those records, O'Brien played bass on both world tours and performed on several TV shows, including The Tonight Show with Jay Leno, Jimmy Kimmel Live!, The Ellen DeGeneres Show, The Celebrity Roast of Pamela Anderson, and a handful of European TV shows, including Top of the Pops.

Recording career

In 2004, O'Brien chose to focus more on recording sessions in Los Angeles. Over the next few years, O'Brien quickly accumulated an impressive resume of artists that he has recorded with, such as Celine Dion, Chris Cornell, Brian McKnight, Mýa, Tommy Lee, Lindsay Lohan, and Kelly Clarkson, including her number-one single, "Because of You", on the grammy-award-winning album, Breakaway.

We Are the Fallen

In 2009 O'Brien became a member of the new band We Are the Fallen, along with former Evanescence members Ben Moody, Rocky Gray, and John LeCompt, featuring American Idol runner-up Carly Smithson on vocals. The band was launched on June 22, 2009, at a press conference in Hollywood, California, and soon signed a deal with Universal Republic Records. Their debut album was released on May 11, 2010, and the band toured extensively throughout that year, supporting the band HIM, as well as playing many summer festivals in Europe such as Download Festival and Rock Am Ring.

Lita Ford

In early 2012, O'Brien joined Lita Ford's touring band. The band toured extensively in 2012 as the opening act for Def Leppard and toured the world in 2013 in support Living Like a Runaway. O'Brien played bass on Lita Ford's 2013 live album The Bitch Is Back...Live.

Daughtry

In May 2022, O'Brien left Lita Ford and announced that he would be playing bass on Daughtry's "Dearly Beloved" tour throughout 2022. following the tour, O'Brien joined Daughty as the permanent bassist.

== Recording discography ==
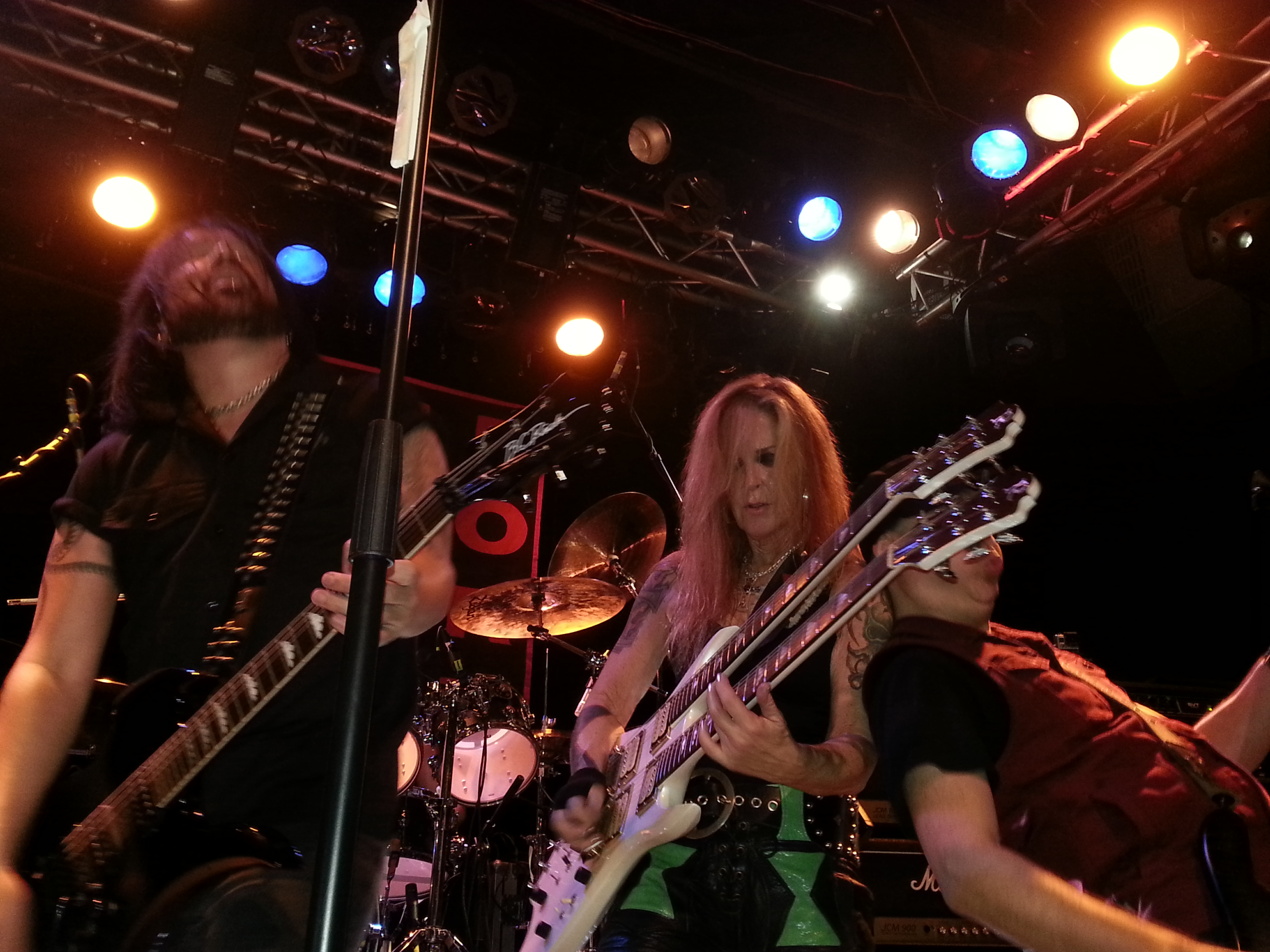
O'Brien performing with Patrick Kennison of American rock band Heaven Below and Lita Ford

Artist	Album	Label
Kilgore	A Search for Reason (*Bonus Track in Japan)	Giant Records / Warner
Kilgore	ECW: Extreme Music	Sanctuary
Ed Vick	Set in Motion	Orchard
Tommy Lee	Never a Dull Moment	MCA Records
Pre)Thing	22nd Century Lifestyle	V2 Records
Kelly Clarkson	Breakaway	RCA / BMG
Ben Moody	The Punisher (Movie Soundtrack)	Wind Up Records
Kelly Clarkson	Because of You – Remixes	RCA / BMG
Smile Empty Soul	Don't Need You (Single)	Lava Records
Kelly Clarkson	Breakaway (Bonus DVD)	BMG International
Brian McKnight & MYA	Forever in Our Hearts (single)	Tsunami Relief .org
Lindsay Lohan	Little More Personal	Casablanca / Universal
Tommy Lee	Goes to College (DVD)	Image Entertainment
Tommy Lee	Celebrity Roast of Pamela Anderson (DVD)	Comedy Central / Paramount
Jason Hook	Safety Dunce	Five Finger
Deadsy	Phantasmagore	Immortal
3Faced	Married to the Wreckage	Trifold
Hana Pestle	Hana Pestle	FNR Records
Lesley Roy	Unbeautiful	Jive Records
Celine Dion	Taking Chances	Sony Music
Heaven Below	Countdown to Devil	Broken Halo
Against All Will	Tomorrow and Today (single)	Stereo Supersonic Music
Hana Pestle	This Way	FNR Records
Against All Will	You Can't Change Me (single)	Stereo Supersonic Music
Jason C. Miller	Last to Go Home	Count Mecha Music
Ben Moody	All for This	FNR Records
Celine Dion	My Love – Essential Collection	Sony Music
Nina Ferraro	Let It Go (single)	Nina Ferraro Music
Against All Will	A Rhyme & Reason	Subsonic Industries
Gus G.	I Am the Fire	Century Media
