= We Are the Fallen =

American hard rock band

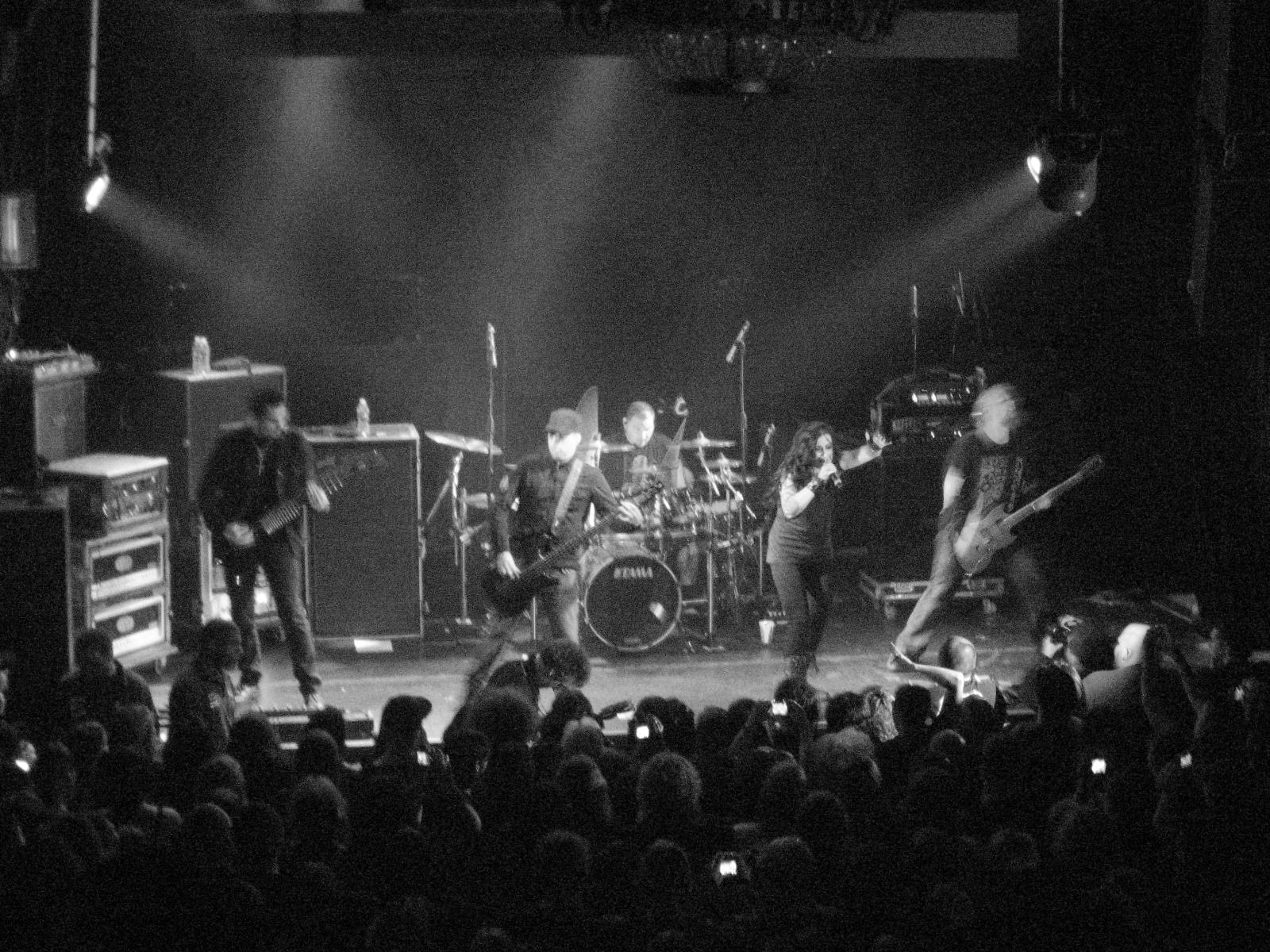
- We Are the Fallen performing at Irving Plaza in New York City in 2010. Left to right: John LeCompt, Marty O'Brien, Rocky Gray, Carly Smithson, and Ben Moody.

Background information
- Origin: Los Angeles, California, U.S.
- Genres: Hard rock; pop metal
- Years active: 2009–present (inactive since 2012)
- Label: Universal Republic (2009–11)
- Members: Rocky Gray; John LeCompt; Ben Moody; Marty O'Brien; Carly Smithson

We Are the Fallen is an American-Irish hard rock band formed in 2009, comprising Irish singer and former American Idol contestant Carly Smithson, guitarists Ben Moody and John LeCompt, drummer Rocky Gray, and bassist Marty O'Brien. Moody, LeCompt, and Gray were previously members of the American rock band Evanescence. The band released their debut album, Tear the World Down, in May 2010. Their final performance occurred in January 2011, and the band has been inactive since.

== History ==
=== Formation ===
Moody said that We Are the Fallen began forming in 2003 when he had discussions with Evanescence tour drummer Rocky Gray and rhythm guitarist John LeCompt about Evanescence moving in a different direction than originally planned. He said they contemplated doing music "with someone else. But the timing wasn't right and it wasn't something I was willing to rush in to". Co-founding Evanescence in 1994 with singer, pianist, and main songwriter Amy Lee, Moody stated in an August 2003 interview that Evanescence was "just Amy and I, and I want to keep it that way", and that he would like tour drummer Rocky Gray to play on the next album but did not need the other tour players, LeCompt and bassist Will Boyd. Gray and LeCompt, who were friends of Moody from Little Rock, had been hired as tour performers on Evanescence's Fallen tour, after Evanescence had completed the album. Moody left Evanescence in October 2003 in the middle of a European tour, citing creative differences. In 2006, LeCompt said that Lee "gained authority as soon as Ben Moody walked out the door. They had an equal partnership, but he was the man, he had to strangle the band, all the life out of it". When Gray and LeCompt left the band in 2007, Moody reached out to them in attempts to continue working together, recruiting Moody's friend Marty O'Brien in the process.

Moody held auditions looking for a lead singer in New York City. He said that he though the search for the band's "soulmate" was going to take a long time due to the exhaustive process. Moody's roommate showed him videos online of American Idol singer Carly Smithson performing her rendition of Evanescence's "Bring Me to Life", which was coincidentally the song all singers used to audition for Moody and the band. Moody was then introduced to Smithson who was working on a solo album after the tour with American Idol. Moody and Smithson then discussed what they wanted to do musically and they discovered their needs were "identical". Smithson felt that Idol was for a family audience which wasn't "creatively and musically the best" for her at that time. She also stated that trying to make a solo album was lonely and "now there's four other people who bring all sorts of different things to the table and musically it's like everything I was trying to do ... heavy rock with great melodies." "Everything that I was told about Carly was right. She had a great voice, but she also has an incredibly strong presence, the kind of presence that is big enough to handle what it is this band does, both musically and visually. Because of that, she was perfect", Moody said later.

The band was originally named The Fallen, but had to change their name in June 2009 due to potential copyright issues with another band called The Fallen. Moody said that the name "seemed like a really good idea to encompass all of our fans that we already had with our previous band and I guess make it more of an inviting thing for all the fans to come in and be a part of something rather than just be a fan of a group". In a June 2009 interview, he said that We Are the Fallen differs from Evanescence in that it was started as a "real band" while Evanescence was not "set up that way in the past", and that it "brings more energy than Evanescence could ever muster". He also said, "We cannot try to be who we are. If there is some similarity in sound, it's because that genre was created by us." In another interview, he stated that, musically, We are the Fallen is going in a "completely different direction" than Evanescence, adding that in between Evanescence's music, "people might want something to listen to before then. That's what we're here for." Smithson said that although the band features former players from Evanescence and may perform some Evanescence songs live, We are the Fallen has "really nothing to do with Evanescence".

We Are the Fallen officially debuted on June 22, 2009, performing two songs in Los Angeles: their first single "Bury Me Alive" and Evanescence's "Going Under". Fans could register their email address at the band's website to receive a free download of Bury Me Alive". Only the first 100,000 registrants qualified for the download.

In March 2010, Lee was asked what she thought of the formation of the band, to which she stated: "It just doesn't have anything to do with me or Evanescence. The only thing that bothers me about it, really, is I keep hearing ... 'the original members.' The only original members of Evanescence are me and Ben; John and Rocky came into the band after we'd already recorded Fallen, so there's a lot of years there...that didn't include anybody but Ben and I. Other than that, I don't have an opinion or anything to say about it."

The band confronted comparisons with Evanescence. "I really do think that the farther we go, the more distinct the two [bands] will become from each other... We're so different that I really don't see it being that much of an issue", Moody told Kerrang! magazine in April 2010.

=== Record deal and Tear the World Down ===
The band originally planned to release two songs for free over the internet every two months and afterward compiling them onto a record with orchestral interludes. They planned to tour theaters across the U.S. rather than clubs or arenas to focus on "performance elements that go beyond music." These plans changed when it was announced that We Are the Fallen signed a record deal with Universal Republic Records on October 28, 2009, for release of a full-length debut album. The band then released a remixed version of their original single, "Bury Me Alive", on February 2, 2010, to include an orchestral outro extending the song by a full minute. The song was available for purchase exclusively online at digital media outlets. On the same day, the band set up an additional free download for an acoustic version of "Bury Me Alive" at their website. The video for the song premiered on March 25, 2010, on AOL's Noisecreep website. The song's popularity grew; The Vampire Diaries used the song in previews for the television show's season finale. "Bury Me Alive" was also featured on "Rumor Has It," an episode of the television show The Hills.

We Are the Fallen performed a 28-city concert tour in the U.S. with the Finnish rock band HIM finishing in New York on May 9, 2010. Their debut concert was held at King's College in London, England in front of a 200-person crowd on March 23, 2010. Following their tour with HIM, the band headlined their own 14-city concert tour in the U.S. and Europe. The band also appeared at the Download Festival at Donington in 2010. We Are the Fallen performed at the "Cirque Des Damnés" show at the Avalon Theater in Hollywood, California on January 22, 2011. A DVD and live album from that show was slated for release later in the year.

The band's debut album, Tear the World Down, was released on May 10, 2010, in the UK and May 11, 2010, in the U.S. where it debuted and peaked at number 33 on the Billboard 200.

In August 2010, Moody released a statement on his history with Lee, Evanescence, and We Are the Fallen, where he said, "Evanescence has progressed a great distance from the original sound and made it clear that they intended to expand much further", and that We Are the Fallen is a different entity through which he makes the music that he loves.

Moody revealed in a Facebook posting that the band was dropped by Universal Republic on May 27, 2011.

=== Post-record deal ===
The band released in January 2012 a digital version of the "Cirque Des Damnés" concert performed the previous year.

On May 20, 2012, Moody uploaded a video to his YouTube account of he and Smithson explaining the future plans for the band. He stated that he has written enough material for one and a half new albums, and that LeCompt and Gray have also been writing music. Smithson said that she has written a "killer hit" that she has yet to preview to the rest of the band.

In May 2021, the band was announced as a special performer for Shiprocked 2022, marking their first performance date since 2011. On January 25, 2022, Smithson said on an Instagram comment that Shiprocked 2022 changed their COVID-19 policy to require performers be fully vaccinated, including the additional administering of the booster dosage. She wrote; "There wasn’t enough time for everyone [in the band] to get boosted so a lot of bands couldn’t participate." She and O'Brien performed in the Stowaways. In addition, she noted that We Are The Fallen would play in 2023 along with land shows; however, as of February 2025, the band has not announced any new performances or activities and remains inactive.

== Musical style ==
The band has been categorized as rock, hard rock, and pop metal.

== Band members ==
- Rocky Gray – drums
- John LeCompt – rhythm guitar
- Ben Moody – lead guitar
- Marty O'Brien – bass guitar
- Carly Smithson – vocals

== Discography ==
=== Studio albums ===
List of studio albums, with selected chart positions
Title	Album details	Peak chart positions				
Title	Album details	US	US Alt.	US Hd. Rock	US Rock	CAN
Tear the World Down	Released: May 10, 2010; Label: Universal Republic	33	7	6	12	54

=== Singles ===
List of singles, with selected chart positions
Title	Year	Peak chart positions	Album
Title	Year	US Main.	Album
"Bury Me Alive"	2010	33	Tear the World Down
"Tear the World Down"	2010	—	Tear the World Down
"Sleep Well, My Angel"	2010	—	Tear the World Down
"—" denotes a recording that did not chart.
