= Galadari =

Galadari may refer to:

- House of Galadari, a prominent Dubai-based Arab family
- Galadari Brothers, a United Arab Emirates-based conglomerate
  - Galadari Hotel, a five-star hotel in Sri Lanka, in which Galadari Brothers are the controlling shareholders
  - Galadari Printing and Publishing, a media company under Galadari Brothers
- Abdul Latif Galadari (1939–2002), an Emirati businessman
- Suhail Galadari (born 1977), an Emirati businessman
