= Mohammad Rehman =

Mohammad Rahman may refer to:

- Mohammad Lutfur Rahman (1889–1936), Bangladeshi author
- Muhammad Rehman, Pakistani cardiac surgeon
- Mohammed Ali Rahman Jamin, Qatari footballer
- MD Rahman, American politician
- Muhammed Rahman, Australian electrical engineer
