= List of people from Peshawar =

This is a list of notable people from Peshawar, Pakistan.

== Sports ==
- Jansher Khan, Record Eight Times Winner of the Squash World Open, Record Four Times Winners of the World Super Series and Guinness World Records holder is widely considered to be the greatest player in the history of the game. He went on to win British Open titles, 6 titles over 8 years. He was also world No.1 for consecutive 10 years from 1988 till 1998.
- Riaz Afridi, cricketer
- Shahid Afridi, Pakistani cricketer
- Iftikhar Ahmed, cricketer
- Umar Gul, cricketer
- Arshad Khan, cricketer
- Yasir Hameed, cricketer
- Aamir Atlas Khan, Pakistan squash player
- Hashim Khan, former British Open squash champion
- Jahangir Khan, former World No. 1 squash player
- Kabir Khan, cricketer
- Mohammad Rizwan, cricketer
- Qamar Zaman, squash player
- Wajahatullah Wasti, cricketer

== Politicians ==
- Arbab Jehangir Khan, former Chief Minister
- Taimur Khan Jhagra, Currently Finance and Health Minister, and architect of the Universal Sehat Card programme
- Farhatullah Babar, Pakistan Peoples Party president and spokesman
- Bashir Ahmad Bilour, Member of Provincial Assembly, senior minister
- Samar Haroon Bilour, First female elected parliamentarian from Peshawar, MPA, widow of Haroon Bilour
- Abdur Rab Nishtar, leader in Pakistan Movement; first Governor of Punjab, Pakistan
- Bhim Sen Sachar, Indian politician
- Shandana Gulzar, Pakistani politician

== Military ==
- Abdul Waheed Kakar, 9th Chief of the Army Staff of Pakistan
- Hakimullah Khan Durrani, 5th Chief of Air Staff of Pakistan
- Akhtar Abdur Rahman, Chairman Joint Chiefs of Staff Committee, DG ISI
- Mian Hayaud Din, Chief of General Staff of the Pakistan Army

== Judiciary ==
- Bilal Khan (judge), Chief Justice of Islamabad High Court and Lahore High Court
- Mian Shakirullah Jan, Chief Justice of Supreme Court of Pakistan

== Writers ==
- Rahman Baba, Pashto poet
- Patras Bokhari, Urdu poet
- Ghulam Muhammad Qasir, Urdu poet
- Sahibzada Abdul Qayyum, founder of Islamia College and Legislative Council member

== Actors and Singers ==
- Ismail Gulgee, artist
- Raj Kapoor, Indian actor
- Marina Khan, actress
- Dilip Kumar, Indian actor
- Shah Rukh Khan, Indian actor
- Prithviraj Kapoor, Indian film actor
- Surinder Kapoor, Indian film producer
- Vinod Khanna, Indian actor
- Haroon Bacha, Pashto singer, musician, and composer
- Said Rahman Shino, Pashto comedian and actor
- Ismail Shahid, Pashto comedian and actor
- Ayman Udas, singer and songwriter
- Sajid Ghafoor, musician
- Gul Panra, singer
- Khyal Muhammad, Pashto folk singer
- Gulzar Alam, Pashto singer and composer
- Zeek Afridi, Urdu-Pashto singer

== Others ==
- Asif Bashir, rescue worker, volunteer and philanthropist
- Kundan Lal Jaggi, co-founder of the Moti Mahal restaurant
- F. C. Kohli, father of Indian IT Industry
- Kuku Kohli, Bollywood director
- Sania Nishtar, cardiologist and health policy expert
- Suhail Galadari, businessman
- Abdur Rehman Peshawri, member of the Young Turks, Turkish Ambassador to Afghanistan
- Muhammad Rehman, cardiovascular surgeon and founder Rehman Medical College
- Malik Saad, late CCPO of Peshawar
- Vasubandhu, founder of the Yogacara school of Buddhism
- Mohammed Yahya, educationist, Minister of Education N.W.F.P., 1946-1947
- Abul Rauf Seemab, potter and politician
- Rahimullah Yusufzai, journalist
