= Kim Nielsen (guitarist) =

American musician (born 1964)

- Born: Kim Nielsen; 1964 (age 61–62)
- Genres: Hard rock, heavy metal, tribute
- Occupation: Musician
- Instrument: Bass guitar
- Years active: 1988–present
- Labels: InsideOut Music; Geffen Records; Shrapnel Records; Roadrunner Records
- Website: myspace.com/kimnielsenparsons

Kim Nielsen (born 1964) is an American hard rock bassist known for being a member of the all-female band Phantom Blue.

== Biography ==
Kim Nielsen first picked up the bass guitar at the age of 12. In the years to come, she played with local bands in Los Angeles, California, while taking lessons from Racer X bassist Juan Alderete. In 1988, following a recommendation by Alderete, Nielsen joined the all-female heavy metal band Phantom Blue. The band with Nielsen on bass recorded three albums and toured successfully in Europe.

Following her departure from the band in April 1994, Nielsen moved to England, where she married former Belladonna drummer Adam Parsons, now an artist manager in the music business. In 1996, she joined the Nottingham-based metal band Wraith and recorded their Schizophrenia album. After years of living in England, she returned to Los Angeles in 2000, where she had brief stints with the all-female AC/DC tribute band ThundHerStruck and a Queensrÿche tribute called Jet City Woman. In 2004, she collaborated with the supergroup Asia as a guest bassist on their album Silent Nation.

Nielsen joined former Phantom Blue members Linda McDonald, Gigi Hangach and Tina Wood for a reunion at a benefit concert on May 26, 2009, at the Whisky a Go Go in Hollywood, California. The concert was for the benefit of brain research in memory of Phantom Blue co-founder Michelle Meldrum, who died of a cystic growth in her brain on May 21, 2008.

Nielsen cites Geezer Butler, Pete Way, Steve Harris and Eddie Jackson among her musical influences.

== Discography ==
=== Phantom Blue ===
- Phantom Blue (1989)
- "Why Call It Love" (single) (1989)
- Built to Perform (1993)
- My Misery (4-track EP) (1993)
- Prime Cuts & Glazed Donuts (1995)

=== Other contributions ===
- Schizophrenia (Wraith) (1996)
- Silent Nation (Asia) (2004)
- Revelation (Wraith) (2017)
