= List of heavy metal guitarists =

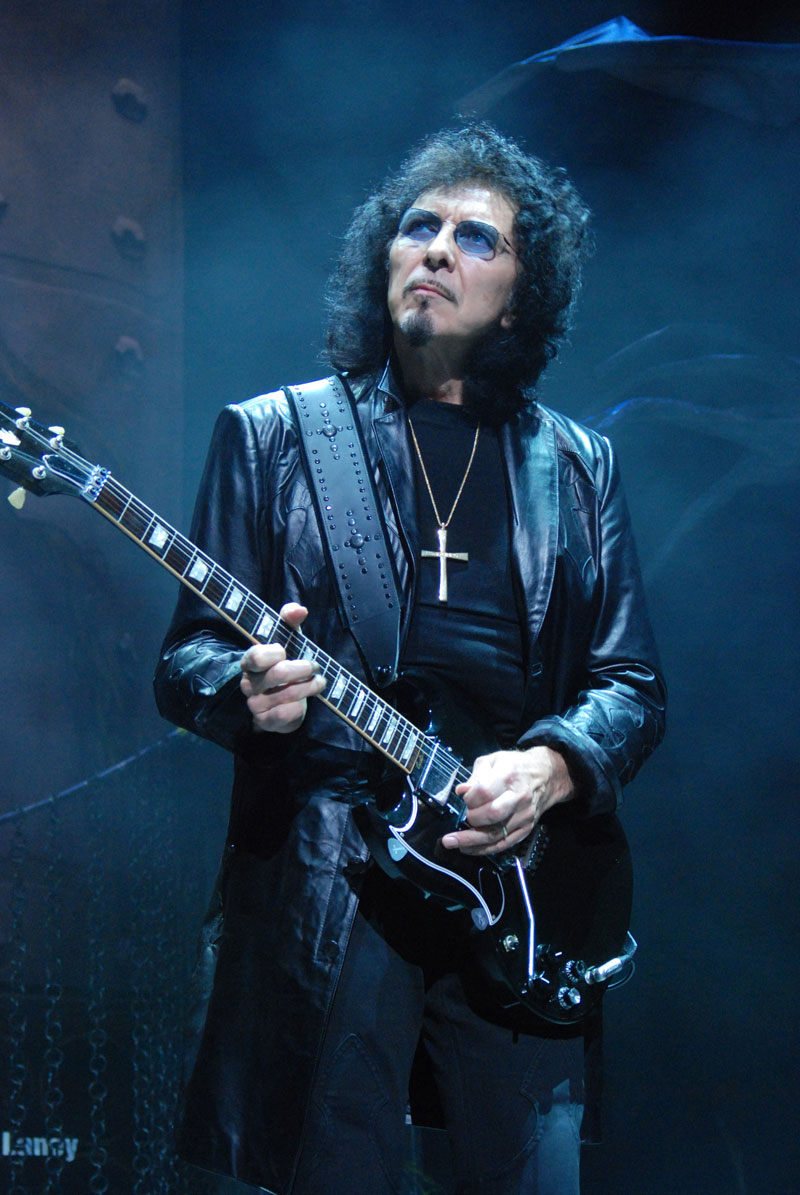
Tony Iommi onstage with Heaven & Hell in 2009. Iommi is considered one of the most influential heavy metal guitarists.

This is a list of heavy metal guitarists from the 1960s to the 2010s. Heavy metal guitar players use highly-amplified electric guitar playing that is rooted in the guitar playing styles developed in 1960s-era blues rock and psychedelic rock. Metal guitar playing uses a massive sound, characterized by highly amplified distortion, extended guitar solos and overall loudness. The electric guitar and the sonic power that it projects through amplification has historically been the key element in heavy metal.

Heavy metal bands often have two electric guitarists, with one guitarist playing rhythm guitar and one guitarist playing lead guitar. The rhythm guitar player is part of the rhythm section of the band, along with the bass guitarist and the drummer. The lead guitarist plays guitar solos, instrumental melody lines and melodic fill passages. In power trios, which consist of a guitarist, bassist and drummer, with one or more members singing lead vocals, the single guitarist will switch between rhythm guitar and lead guitar roles as needed.

Only add names here if the person has their own article - anything else will be removed.

== A ==
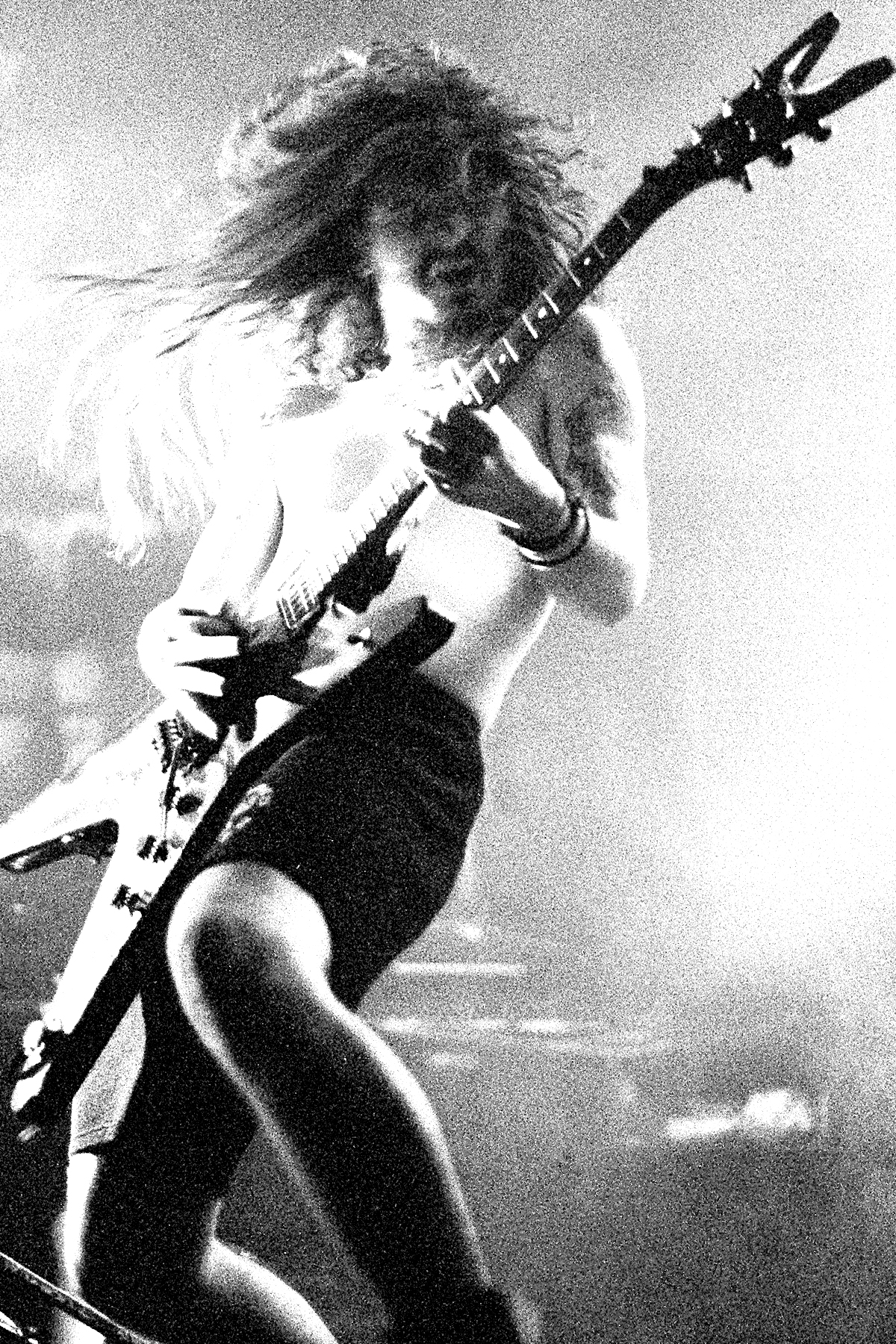
"Dimebag" Darrell Abbott (1966–2004) was killed by a gunman during a concert.

- Tosin Abasi (Animals as Leaders)
- Dimebag Darrell Abbott (Pantera, Damageplan, Rebel Meets Rebel)
- Willie Adler (Lamb of God)
- Lord Ahriman (Dark Funeral)
- Mikael Åkerfeldt (Opeth)
- Mike Albert (Megadeth)
- Jimmy Allen (Against All Will)
- Paul Allender (Cradle of Filth)
- Lee Altus (Exodus)
- Christopher Amott (Arch Enemy)
- Michael Amott (Arch Enemy, Carcass, Spiritual Beggars)
- Nicke Andersson (The Hellacopters)
- Ole Petter Andreassen (Thulsa Doom, The Cumshots)
- Christian Andreu (Gojira)
- Salman Ahmad (Junoon)
- Faraz Anwar (Dusk)
- Rob Arnold (Chimaira)
- Trey Azagthoth (Morbid Angel)

== B ==
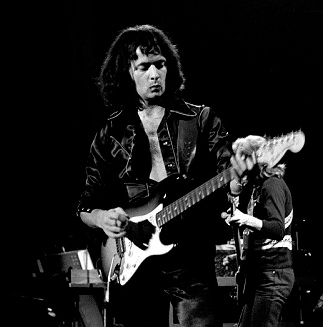
Ritchie Blackmore in Norway, 1977

- Matt Bachand (Shadows Fall)
- Rob Barrett (Cannibal Corpse, Malevolent Creation)
- Zoltan Bathory (Five Finger Death Punch)
- Michael Angelo Batio (Holland, Nitro)
- Reb Beach (Winger, Whitesnake, Dokken)
- Corey Beaulieu (Trivium)
- Jason Becker (Cacophony, David Lee Roth)
- Nuno Bettencourt (Extreme)
- Jack Black (Tenacious D)
- Ritchie Blackmore (Deep Purple, Rainbow, Blackmore's Night)
- Doug Blair (W.A.S.P)
- Eric Bloom (Blue Öyster Cult)
- Fallon Bowman (Kittie)
- Mick Box (Uriah Heep)
- Vidoja Božinović (Rok Mašina, Riblja Čorba)
- Vito Bratta (White Lion)
- Chris Broderick (Jag Panzer, Megadeth)
- Michael Bruce (Alice Cooper)
- Amalie Bruun (Myrkur)
- Buckethead (Deli Creeps, Giant Robot, Colonel Claypool's Bucket of Bernie Brains, Praxis, Guns N' Roses)
- Jordan Buckley (Every Time I Die)
- Adam Buszko (Hate)
- Glen Buxton (Alice Cooper)

== C ==
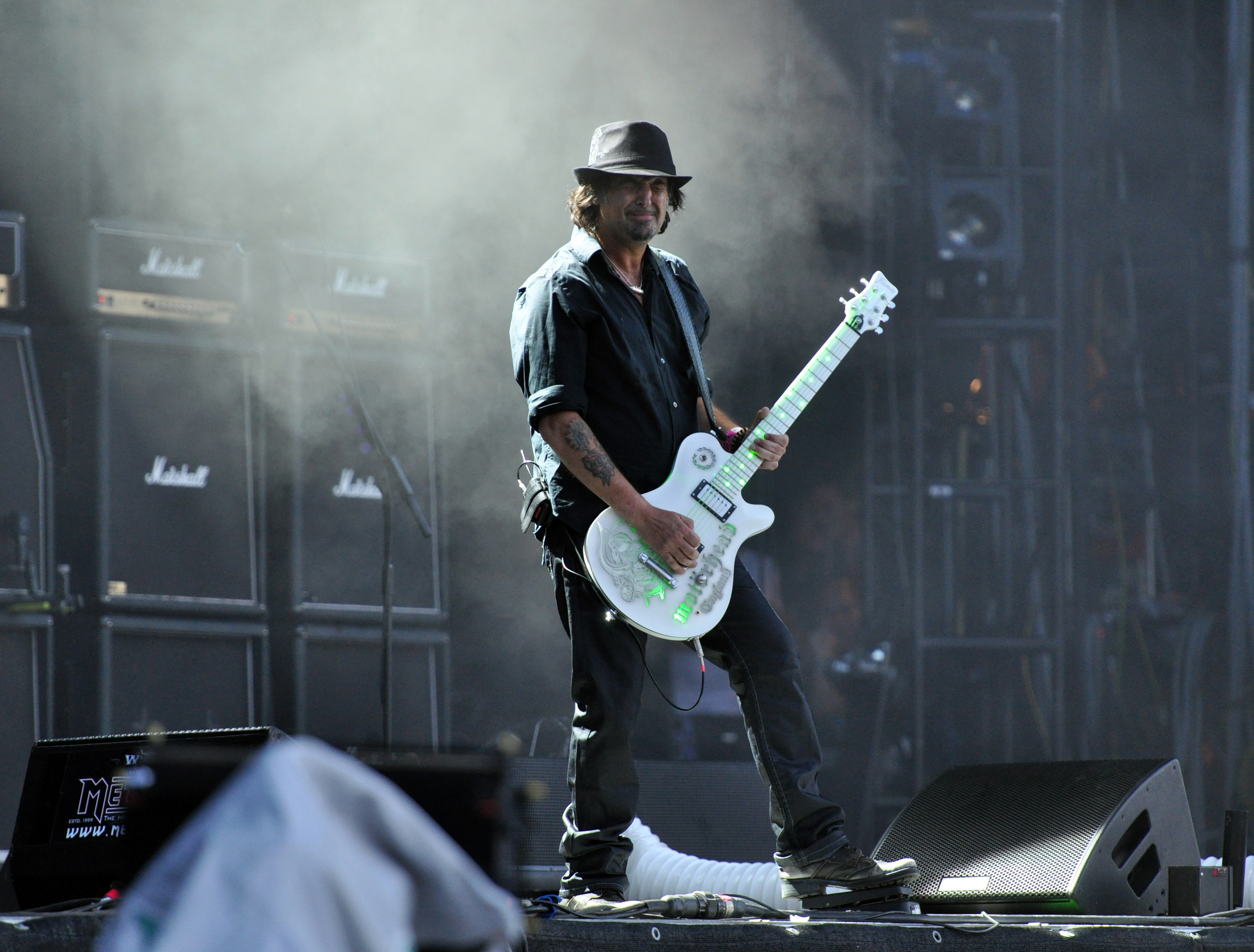
Phil Campbell of Motörhead playing at Wacken Open Air 2013 with a Framus guitar

- Ernie C (Body Count)
- Phil Campbell (Motörhead)
- Vivian Campbell (Dio, Def Leppard, Thin Lizzy)
- Jerry Cantrell (Alice in Chains)
- Stephen Carpenter (Deftones)
- Nick Catanese (Black Label Society)
- Max Cavalera (Sepultura, Soulfly, Cavalera Conspiracy)
- Carlos Cavazo (Quiet Riot, Ratt)
- Dino Cazares (Fear Factory, Divine Heresy, Asesino, Brujeria)
- Manny Charlton (Nazareth)
- David T. Chastain (Chastain)
- "Metal" Mike Chlasciak (Halford, PainmuseuM, Testament, Sebastian Bach, Jim Breuer)
- Zal Cleminson (Nazareth)
- Janne JB Christoffersson (Grand Magus)
- Mike Church (Still Remains)
- Mike Clark (No Mercy, Suicidal Tendencies)
- Steve Clark (Def Leppard)
- Eddie Clarke (Motörhead)
- Gilby Clarke (Guns N' Roses, Supernova)
- Andy Classen (Holy Moses)
- Phil Collen (Def Leppard)
- Rusty Cooley
- Korey Cooper (Skillet)
- Randy Cooper (Texas Hippie Coalition)
- Nicole Couch (Phantom Blue)
- Robbin Crosby (Ratt)
- Doc Coyle (God Forbid)
- Andrew Craighan (My Dying Bride)
- John Christ (Danzig)

== D ==
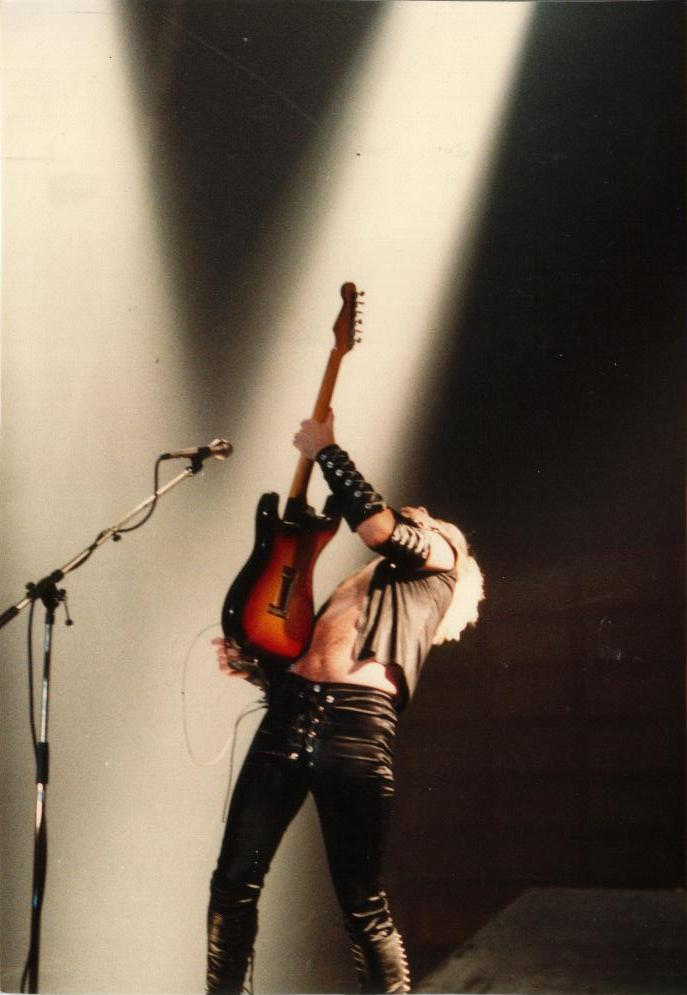
K.K. Downing, a former member of Judas Priest, shown here in 1980

- Jean-François Dagenais (Ex Deo, Kataklysm)
- Robert Dahlqvist (The Hellacopters, Thunder Express)
- D-Roc (Body Count)
- Mahyar Dean (Angband)
- Chris DeGarmo (Queensrÿche)
- Phil Demmel (Machine Head)
- Isaac Delahaye (Epica, God Dethroned)
- Warren DeMartini (Ratt)
- Britt "Lightning" Denaro (Jaded, Vixen)
- C. C. DeVille (Poison)
- Matt DeVries (Chimaira)
- Buck Dharma (Blue Öyster Cult)
- Jonathan Donais (Shadows Fall)
- Dan Donegan (Disturbed)
- K.K. Downing (Judas Priest)
- Ol Drake (Evile)
- Jake Dreyer (Iced Earth, Witherfall, Kobra and the Lotus, White Wizzard)
- Oscar Dronjak (HammerFall, Ceremonial Oath)
- Dennis "Seregor" Droomers (Carach Angren)
- Glen Drover (Megadeth)
- Jeff "Mantas" Dunn (Venom)
- Joe Duplantier (Gojira, Empalot, Cavalera Conspiracy)
- Adam Dutkiewicz (Killswitch Engage)

== E ==
- Evan K (solo artist, Cypecore)
- Mattias "IA" Eklundh (Freak Kitchen, Jonas Hellborg)
- Dani Evans (Alestorm)

== F ==
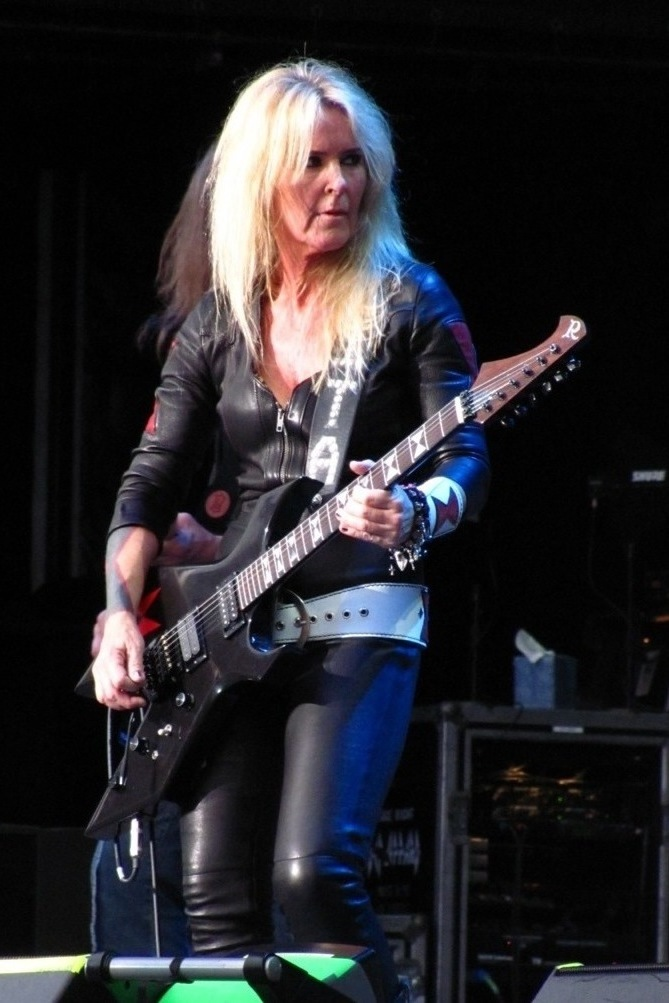
While the majority of metal guitarists are men, there are notable women metal guitarists, such as Lita Ford, who played in The Runaways and as a solo act under her own name.

- Richie Faulkner (Judas Priest)
- Jörg Fischer (Accept)
- John 5 (Marilyn Manson, Rob Zombie)
- Henrik Flyman (Evil Masquerade, Moahni Moahna, Lacrimosa)
- Robb Flynn (Machine Head)
- Lita Ford
- Herman Frank (Accept, Victory)
- Ace Frehley (KISS)
- Jay Jay French (Twisted Sister)
- Marty Friedman (Cacophony, Megadeth)
- Ross Friedman (Manowar, Ross the Boss Band, Death Dealer, The Dictators, Shakin Street)
- Simon Füllemann (Cataract)

== G ==
- Gus G. (Dream Evil, Firewind, Nightrage, Ozzy Osbourne)
- Tracy G (Dio)
- Galder (Dimmu Borgir, Old Man's Child)
- Rory Gallagher (Taste)
- Mel Galley (Whitesnake)
- Anthony Gallo (Suicidal Tendencies, Los Cycos, Nick Menza)
- Enrik Garcia (Dark Moor)
- Janet Gardner (Vixen)
- Suzi Gardner (L7)
- Kyle Gass (Tenacious D)
- Synyster Gates (Avenged Sevenfold)
- Bjorn Gelotte (In Flames)
- Rocky George (Suicidal Tendencies)
- Janick Gers (Iron Maiden)
- Walter Giardino (Rata Blanca, V8 (band))
- Paul Gilbert (Racer X, Mr. Big)
- Brad Gillis (Night Ranger, Ozzy Osbourne)
- Hamish Glencross (My Dying Bride)
- Craig Goldy (Dio, Giuffria)
- Pier Gonella (Mastercastle, Necrodeath)
- Scott Gorham (Thin Lizzy)
- Roland Grapow (Masterplan, Helloween)
- Karl Groom (Threshold)
- Tracii Guns (Guns N' Roses, L.A. Guns, Brides of Destruction, Contraband)

== H ==
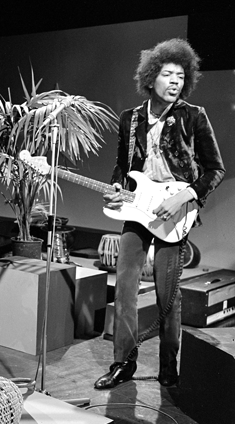
Jimi Hendrix performing on the Dutch television show Hoepla in 1967

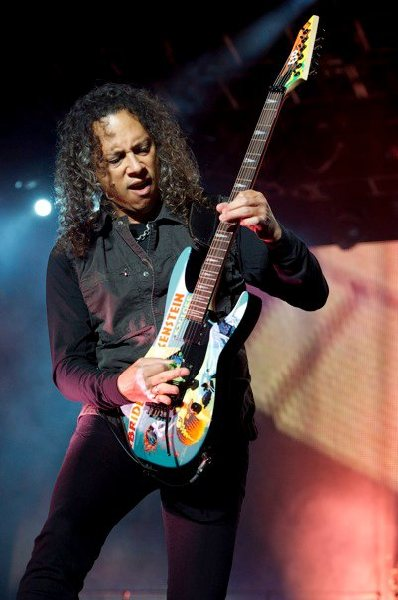
Kirk Hammett of Metallica playing in Mexico in 2010

- Sammy Hagar (Montrose, Solo Artist, Van Halen)
- Shannon Hamm (Death, Control Denied)
- Kirk Hammett (Metallica, Exodus)
- Greg Handevidt (Megadeth)
- Michael Hankel (Holy Moses)
- Jeff Hanneman (Slayer)
- Kai Hansen (Helloween, Iron Savior, Gamma Ray)
- Mitch Harris (Napalm Death, Goatlord, Defecation)
- Dan Hawkins (The Darkness, Stone Gods)
- Justin Hawkins (The Darkness, Hot Leg)
- Matt Heafy (Trivium)
- Helmuth (Belphegor)
- Jimi Hendrix
- James Hetfield (Metallica)
- Kenny Hickey (Type O Negative)
- hide (X Japan)
- Scotti Hill (Skid Row)
- Brent Hinds (Mastodon)
- Nick Hipa (As I Lay Dying)
- Hizaki (Versailles)
- Terrance Hobbs (Suffocation)
- Wolf Hoffmann (Accept)
- Chris Holmes (W.A.S.P.)
- Gary Holt (Exodus)
- Jason Hook (Five Finger Death Punch)
- Dann Huff (White Heart, Giant)
- Scott Hull (Pig Destroyer, Agoraphobic Nosebleed, Anal Cunt)

== I ==
- Scott Ian (Anthrax, Damnocracy)
- Chris Impellitteri (Impellitteri)
- Infernus (Gorgoroth, Borknagar)
- Tony Iommi (Black Sabbath)
- Anders Iwers (Ceremonial Oath)

== J ==
- Matthias Jabs (Scorpions)
- Jason Richardson (All that Remains)
- Joan Jett (The Runaways)
- Heri Joensen (Týr)
- Kelly Johnson (Girlschool)
- Ruud Jolie (Within Temptation)
- Adam Jones (Tool)
- Håvard Jørgensen (Ulver, Satyricon)
- Patrick Judge (Demon Hunter, The Showdown)

== K ==
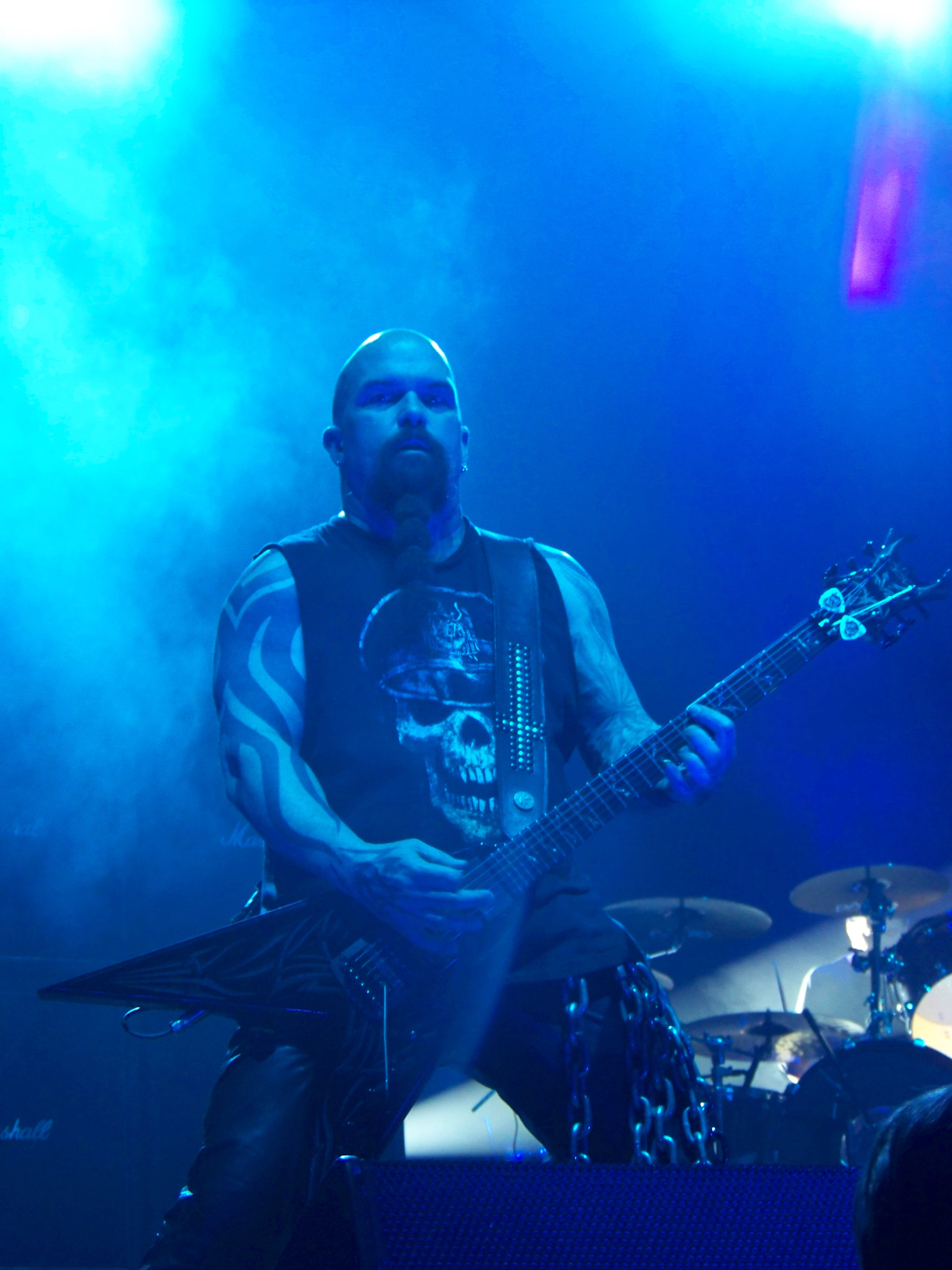
Kerry King playing with Slayer

- Ben Kasica (Skillet)
- Kiko Loureiro (Megadeth)
- The Great Kat
- Pepper Keenan (Down, Corrosion of Conformity)
- Bill Kelliher (Mastodon, Lethargy, Today Is the Day)
- Mark Kendall (Great White)
- Jeff Kendrick (DevilDriver)
- Wacław Kiełtyka (Decapitated, Vader)
- Kerry King (Slayer, Megadeth)
- Andreas Kisser (Sepultura)
- Richie Kotzen (Mr. Big, Poison, The Winery Dogs)
- Antti Kokko (Kalmah)
- Richard Kruspe (Rammstein, Emigrate)
- Jan Kuehnemund (Vixen)
- Gábor Kukovecz (Pokolgép)
- Alexander Kuoppala (Children of Bodom)
- Kaiser Kuo (Tang Dynasty)
- Xulfi Khan (Call)

== L ==
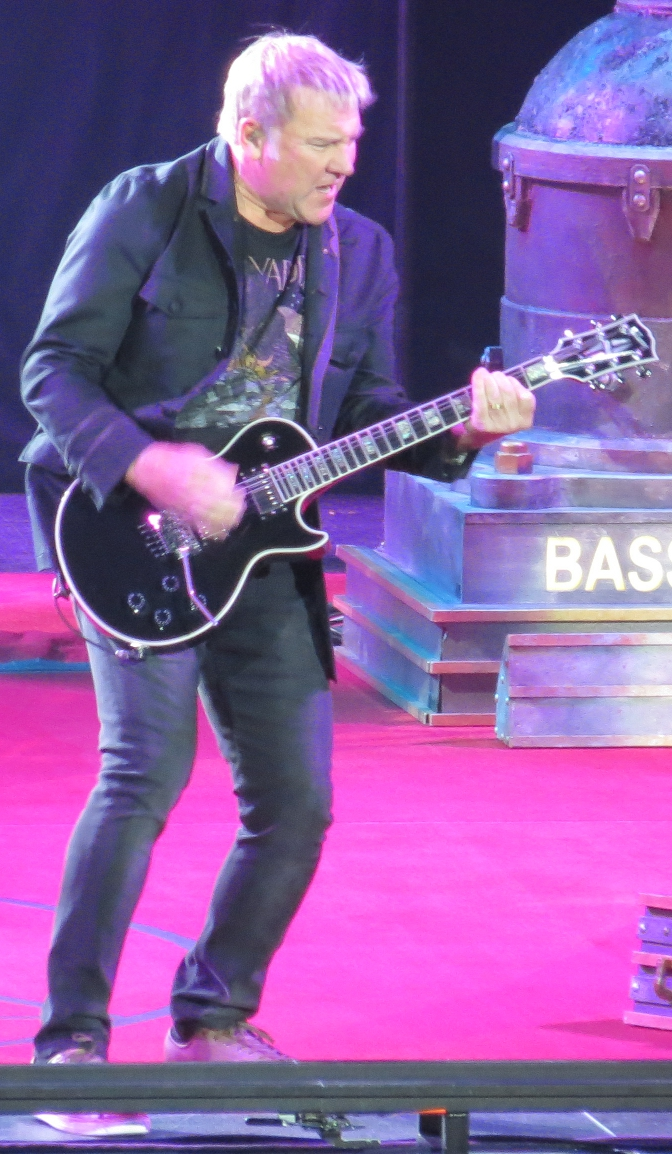
Alex Lifeson in concert with Rush

- Alexi Laiho (Children of Bodom)
- Morgan Lander (Kittie)
- Paul Landers (Rammstein)
- Allen Lanier (Blue Öyster Cult)
- Andy LaRoque (King Diamond, Death)
- Roope Latvala (Children of Bodom, Sinergy)
- Blackie Lawless (W.A.S.P., Sister)
- Jake E. Lee (Ozzy Osbourne, Badlands, Ratt, Rough Cutt)
- Frédéric Leclercq (DragonForce)
- Helmuth Lehner (Belphegor)
- Claus Lessmann (Bonfire)
- Herman Li (DragonForce)
- Alex Lifeson (Rush)
- Peter Lindgren (Opeth)
- Petri Lindroos (Ensiferum, Norther)
- Sead Lipovača (Divlje Jagode)
- Wojtek Lisicki (Lost Horizon)
- Michael Locher (Samael)
- Pete Loeffler (Chevelle)
- Karl Logan (Manowar)
- Jeff Loomis (Nevermore)
- Jens Ludwig (Edguy)
- Steve Lukather (Toto)
- Ahrue Luster (Machine Head)
- George Lynch (Dokken, Lynch Mob)

== M ==
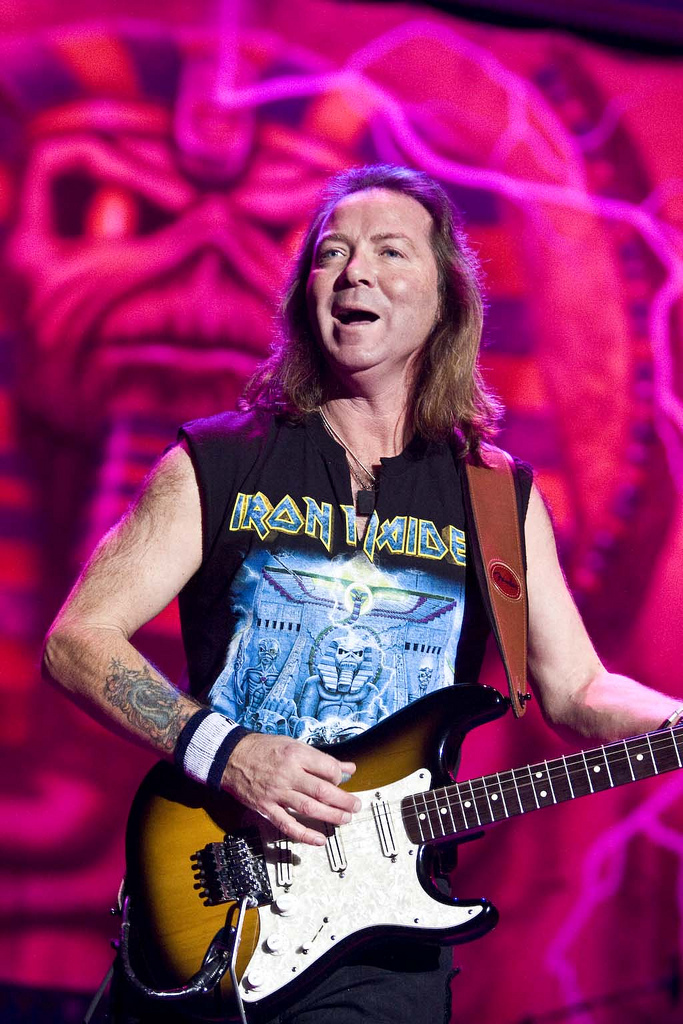
Dave Murray, the guitarist for Iron Maiden, playing in San José in February 2008

- Tony MacAlpine (Planet X, Steve Vai)
- Logan Mader (Machine Head, Soulfly)
- Jari Mäenpää (Wintersun, Ensiferum)
- Daron Malakian (System of a Down, Scars On Broadway)
- Yngwie Malmsteen (Rising Force, Steeler, Alcatrazz)
- Doug Marks (Hawk, Metal Method)
- Mick Mars (Mötley Crüe)
- Mauser (Vader)
- Jim Martin (Faith No More, Voodoocult)
- Lisa Marx (Kittie)
- Sergey Mavrin (Aria)
- Brian May (Queen)
- Tara McLeod (Kittie)
- Michelle Meldrum (Phantom Blue, Meldrum)
- Chaq Mol (Dark Funeral)
- Micky Moody (Whitesnake)
- Gary Moore (Thin Lizzy)
- Vinnie Moore (UFO, Alice Cooper)
- Mark Morton (Lamb of God)
- Tom Morello (Rage Against the Machine, Audioslave)
- James Murphy (Cancer, Death, Disincarnate, Testament)
- Dave Murray (Iron Maiden)
- Dave Mustaine (Megadeth, Metallica)
- Dave Meniketti (Y&T)

== N ==
- Dávid Nagy (Pokolgép)
- Nergal (Behemoth)
- Kristian Niemann (Therion, Demonoid)
- Pontus Norgren (HammerFall, The Poodles)
- John Norum (Europe, Dokken)

== O ==
- Pat O'Brien (Cannibal Corpse, Slayer)
- Anders Odden (Cadaver)
- Eddie Ojeda (Twisted Sister)
- André Olbrich (Blind Guardian)
- Criss Oliva (Savatage)
- Orianthi (Michael Jackson, Alice Cooper)
- Buzz Osborne (Melvins, Fantômas, Venomous Concept)
- Jack Owen (Deicide, Cannibal Corpse)

== P ==
- Jimmy Page (Led Zeppelin)
- Marek Pająk (Vader)
- Pata (X Japan)
- Axel Rudi Pell (Steeler, Axel Rudi Pell)
- Joe Perry (Aerosmith)
- Mille Petrozza (Kreator)
- John Petrucci (Dream Theater, Liquid Tension Experiment)
- Matt Pike (High on Fire, Sleep)
- Al Pitrelli (Alice Cooper, Savatage, Trans-Siberian Orchestra, Megadeth)
- Lex Plotnikoff (Black Obelisk)
- Chris Poland (Megadeth)
- Samuli "Skrymer" Ponsimaa (Finntroll)
- Gian Pyres (Cradle of Filth, Gorerotted)

== Q ==
- Quorthon (Bathory)

== R ==
- Billy Rankin (Nazareth)
- Vernon Reid (Living Colour)
- Randy Rhoads (Quiet Riot, Ozzy Osbourne)
- Mike Riggs (Rob Zombie)
- Marc Rizzo (Cavalera Conspiracy, Soulfly)
- Kane Roberts (Alice Cooper)
- Brian Robertson (Thin Lizzy, Motörhead)
- Omar Rodríguez-López (At the Drive-In, De Facto, Sparta, The Mars Volta)
- Antonio Romano (Hermética)
- Michael Romeo (Symphony X)
- James Root (Slipknot)
- Ulrich Roth (Scorpions)

== S ==
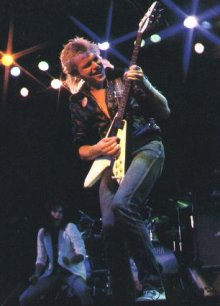
Michael Schenker in 1983

- Dave "the Snake" Sabo (Skid Row)
- Scott LePage (Polyphia)
- David St. Hubbins (Spinal Tap)
- Mark St. John (KISS)
- Richie Sambora (Bon Jovi)
- Karl Sanders (Nile)
- Ralph Santolla (Deicide)
- Yağmur Sarıgül (maNga)
- Robert Sarzo (Ozzy Osbourne, Hurricane)
- Joe Satriani
- Henri Sattler (God Dethroned)
- Dirk Sauer (Edguy)
- Jon Schaffer (Iced Earth, Demons & Wizards)
- Michael Schenker (Scorpions, McAuley Schenker Group, Michael Schenker Group, UFO, Contraband)
- Rudolf Schenker (Scorpions)
- Chuck Schuldiner (Death, Control Denied, Voodoocult)
- Troy Seele (Iced Earth)
- Seth (Behemoth)
- Phil Sgrosso (As I Lay Dying)
- Marcus Siepen (Blind Guardian)
- Silenoz (Dimmu Borgir)
- Joseph Simmons (Morning Again)
- Terji Skibenæs (Týr)
- Alex Skolnick (Testament)
- Skwisgaar Skwigelf (Dethklok)
- Slash (Guns N' Roses, Slash's Snakepit, Velvet Revolver)
- Adrian Smith (Iron Maiden)
- Steve Smyth (Testament, Dragonlord, Nevermore)
- Henri Sorvali (Moonsorrow, Finntroll)
- Donita Sparks (L7)
- Dan Spitz (Anthrax)
- Mike Spreitzer (DevilDriver)
- Paul Stanley (KISS)
- Jack Starr (Virgin Steele)
- Bill Steer (Carcass)
- Jani Stefanovic (Solution .45, The Weakening, Miseration, The Few Against Many)
- Troy Stetina
- Gina Stile (Poison Dollys, Envy, Vixen)
- Izzy Stradlin (Guns N' Roses)
- Dennis Stratton (Iron Maiden)
- Nita Strauss (The Iron Maidens, Alice Cooper, Femme Fatale)
- Nikki Stringfield (The Iron Maidens, Femme Fatale)
- Joel Stroetzel (Killswitch Engage)
- Jesper Strömblad (In Flames, Sinergy)
- Sugizo (X Japan)
- Muhammed Suiçmez (Necrophagist)
- Niklas Sundin (Dark Tranquility)
- Andy Susemihl (U.D.O., Sinner, Bangalore Choir)
- Steve Swanson (Six Feet Under, Massacre)
- John Sykes (Whitesnake, Thin Lizzy, Tygers of Pan Tang)
- Syu (Galneryus)

== T ==
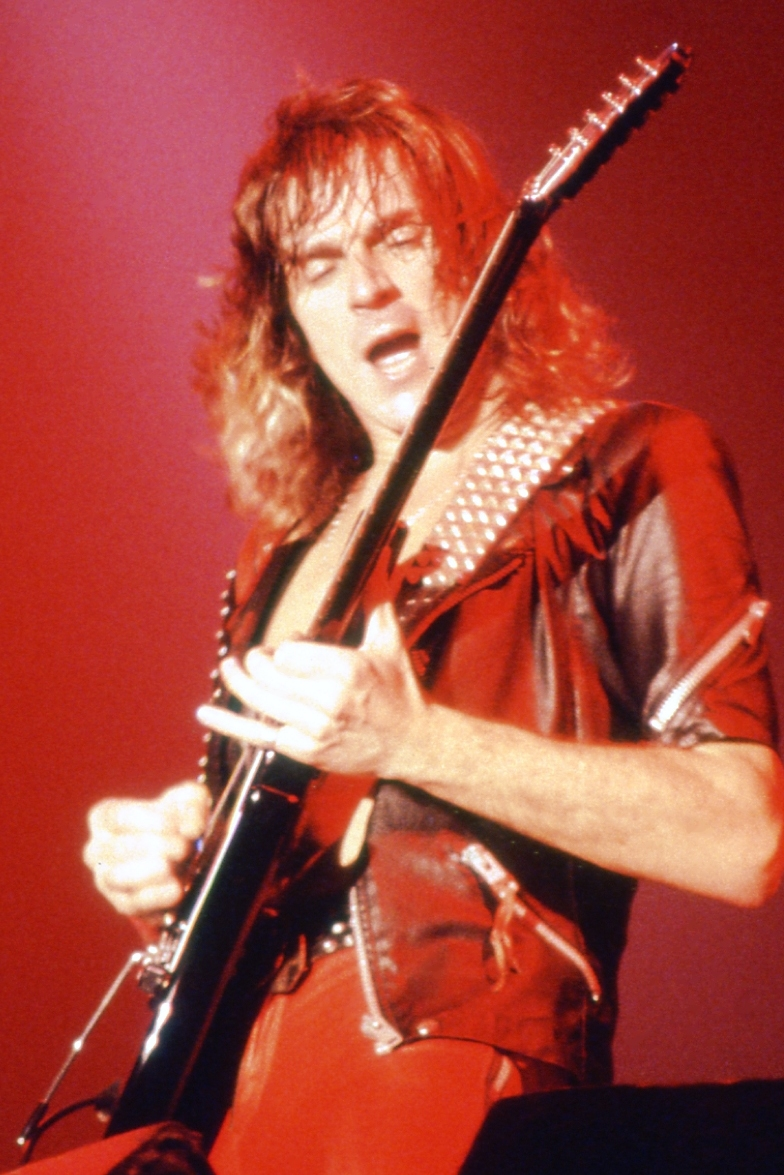
Glenn Tipton is the guitarist for Judas Priest. This photo is from 1984.

- Ty Tabor (King's X)
- Tim Henson (Polyphia)
- Akira Takasaki (Loudness)
- Set Teitan (Watain, Arckanum, Dissection)
- Teru (Versailles)
- Ron Thal (Guns N' Roses)
- Tommy Thayer (Kiss)
- Kim Thayil (Soundgarden)
- Mick Thomson (Slipknot)
- Fredrik Thordendal (Meshuggah)
- Olaf Thörsen (Vision Divine, Labyrinth)
- Glenn Tipton (Judas Priest)
- Markus Toivonen (Ensiferum)
- Bernie Torme (Gillan, Dee Snider, Ozzy Osbourne, Atomic Rooster)
- Tormentor (Gorgoroth, Orcustus)
- Sam Totman (DragonForce)
- Devin Townsend (Strapping Young Lad, Devin Townsend Band)
- Nigel Tufnel (Spinal Tap)
- Luca Turilli (Rhapsody of Fire)

== V ==
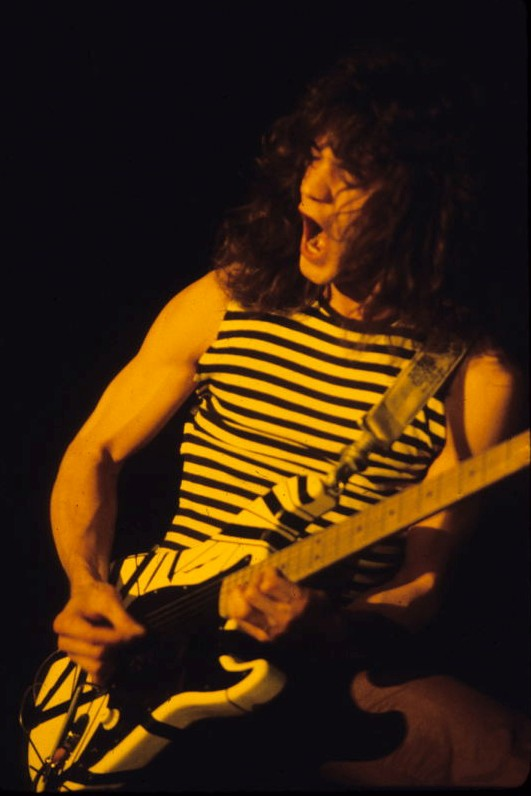
Eddie Van Halen was a shred guitar innovator whose virtuostic guitar solo on the song "Eruption" had a major impact on metal guitar. This picture is from 1977.

- Steve Vai (Devin Townsend, Whitesnake, Alcatrazz, David Lee Roth, Frank Zappa)
- Adrian Vandenberg (Vandenberg, Whitesnake, Manic Eden)
- Eddie Van Halen (Van Halen)
- Zacky Vengeance (Avenged Sevenfold)
- Morten Veland (Sirenia)
- Tommy Victor (Prong, Danzig, Ministry)
- Varg Vikernes (Burzum)
- Vinnie Vincent (KISS, Vinnie Vincent Invasion)
- Fernando von Arb (Krokus)
- Emppu Vuorinen (Nightwish, Altaria)

== W ==
- Paul Waggoner (Prayer For Cleansing, Between the Buried and Me)
- Rich Ward (Stuck Mojo, Fozzy)
- Toki Wartooth (Dethklok)
- Jeff Waters (Annihilator)
- Benjamin Weinman (The Dillinger Escape Plan)
- Scott "Wino" Weinrich (Saint Vitus, Hidden Hand, Spirit Caravan, Place of Skulls, The Obsessed)
- Robert Westerholt (Within Temptation)
- Jordan Whelan (Still Remains)
- Brad Whitford (Aerosmith)
- Hank Williams III
- Pete Willis (Def Leppard)
- Michael Wilton (Queensrÿche)
- Kirk Windstein (Down)
- Piotr Wiwczarek (Vader)
- Würzel (Motörhead)
- Zakk Wylde (Black Label Society, Ozzy Osbourne, Pride & Glory)

== Y ==
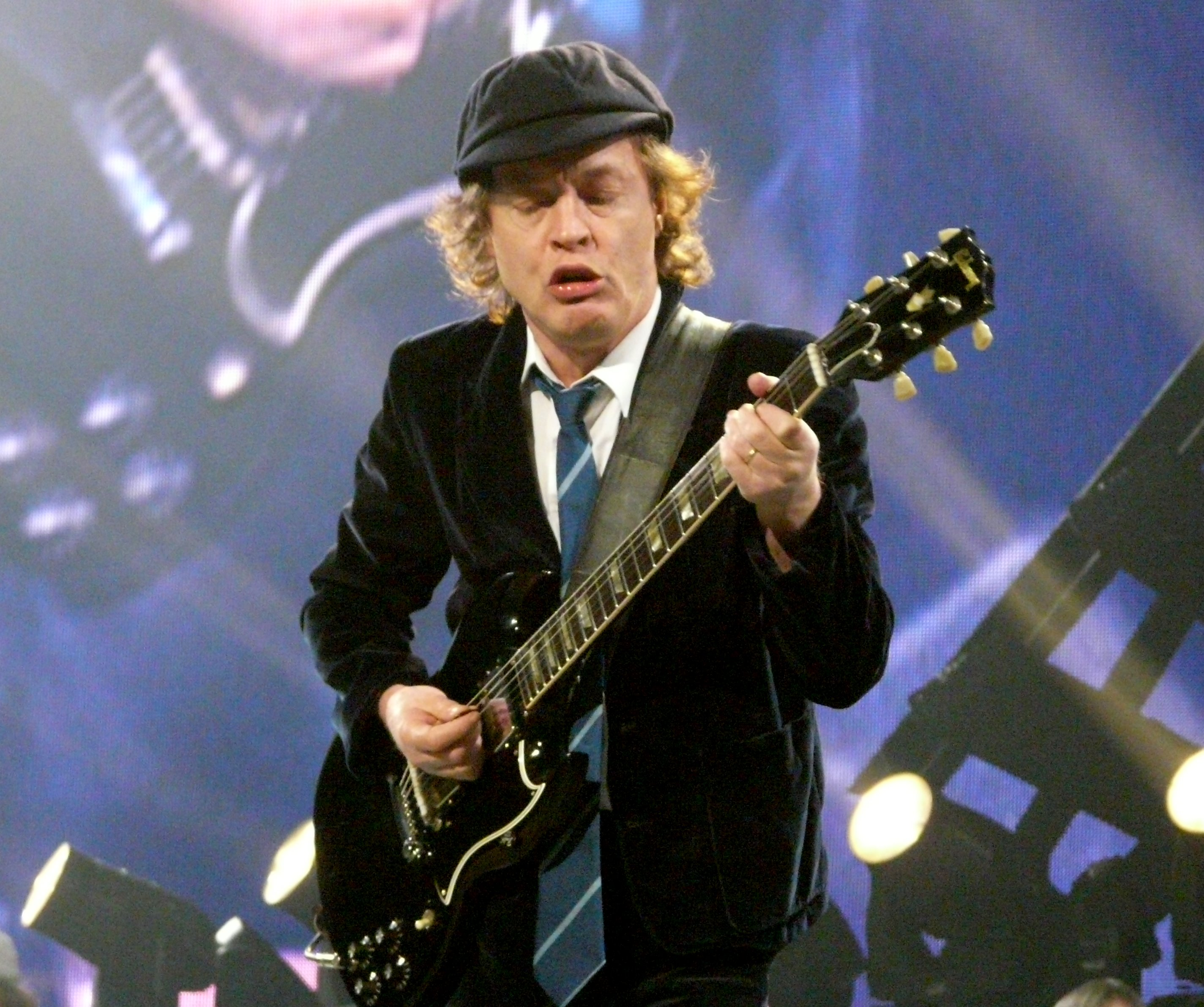
Angus Young from the Australian band AC/DC

- Liu Yijun (Tang Dynasty)
- Sami Yli-Sirniö (Kreator)
- Angus Young (AC/DC)
- Jeff Young (Megadeth)
- Malcolm Young (AC/DC)
- Thomas Youngblood (Kamelot)

== Z ==
- Hans Ziller (Bonfire)

== See also ==
- List of guitarists by genre
