= Jehangir Aziz Hayat =

- Also known as: Jehangir Aziz
- Born: Jehangir Aziz Hayat; 5 June 1989 (age 36); Peshawar, Khyber Pakhtunkhwa, Pakistan
- Genres: Alternative rock, heavy metal, grunge, industrial rock
- Occupations: Singer, guitarist, composer
- Instruments: Guitar, vocals, bass guitar
- Years active: Since 2005; 21 years ago
- Website: jehangirazizhayat.com

Jehangir Aziz Hayat (Urdu: جہانگیر عزیز حیات, romanized: Jehāngīr Azīz Hayāt) (born 5 June 1989), also known simply as Jehangir Aziz, is a Pakistani singer, guitarist and composer.

He released his début album Read Between the Lines in 2009 and is known for his track "Pretend to Be" which won three awards at the Indie Music Channel Awards 2012.

Hayat belongs to a Pashtun family. His musical influences include Nirvana, Pantera and Megadeth.

His first track, "Never Change", was released in 2004 which made him the first grunge musician in Pakistan to appear on the national scene. The track reached the national charts in its first week of release and was nominated for the Best Début Award at the MTV Pakistan awards.

Hayat won awards for the Best Male Alternative Artist, Best Alternative Recording and Best Alternative Video Under $5,000 at the Indie Music Channel Awards 2012.

== Early life and education ==
He was born in Peshawar, Khyber Pakhtunkhwa, to Nilofar Aziz, a furniture designer and the former Chief Secretary of Khyber Pakhtunkhwa, Khalid Aziz. His family belongs to the Mohmand clan of the Pashtuns and they own the ancestral furniture manufacturing business M. Hayat & Brothers in Peshawar. The youngest of the six children, he was described as a sensitive and shy child while growing up as a teen. Hayat showed an interest in music at the age of nine when his sister was taking piano lessons in a private school. When asked about his interest in playing the guitar, he answered:

"I never really wanted to play a musical instrument. I loved music but I never thought of ending up here. They (the guitar lessons) were a way for my parents to push me to take part in an extra circular activity since I was very shy."

Hayat's earliest lessons of the guitar were conducted by Sajid Ghafoor. Later, he enrolled in an after-school guitar lesson group in the International School of Peshawar and learnt the fundamentals of guitar from Sarmad Abdul Ghafoor.

When he was ten years old, his father was persecuted at the hands of General Pervez Musharraf during the 1999 Pakistani coup d'état. Later, Hayat stated that the coup had a profound impact on his life and had channeled the lyrical and melodic content in his compositions.

While in his early teens, Hayat released a demo tape which was circulating around Peshawar. Subsequently, the demo was heard by Fasi Zaka, a music critic, and was positively perceived. In the following months, Zaka met with Hayat's father at a gathering where Zaka discussed the possibility of Jehangir pursuing his interest in music by making a music video for his track "Never Change". Zaka recommended his cousin, Zeeshan Parwez, as a video director for Hayat.

== Career ==
=== Early career: Never Change (2004–2005) ===
During the summer of 2004, Hayat met with Parwez and decided to launch the video for his single "Never Change." The track was co-produced by Hayat and Sarmad Abdul Ghafoor in Peshawar 2003. The video for the track was recorded in the industrial area in Peshawar during the summers of 2004 by Parwez. According to Hayat, the track was influenced by the events that took place in his life when his father was persecuted during the military coup. The lyrical content of the composition mainly dealt with issues of depression.

The video Never Change had a profound impact on the Pakistani music industry. It had made Hayat "the first Grunge musician in Pakistan" to appear on the national scene. The track made it to the third position on the "IM Top Ten" after its release and was subsequently nominated in the Indus Music Awards for Best Debut.

=== Read Between the Lines and Pretend to Be (2009–2010) ===
After a hiatus of five years, Hayat started recording his debut album in Islamabad at the S&M Studios with Sarmad Abdul Ghafoor. The record showcased a much heavier sound than Hayat's previous demo tapes which incorporated alternative-rock and heavy-metal genres. The recording process took less than a year and was released on iTunes in the winter of 2009. According to Hayat, the album's lyrical content had dealt with issues of depression and perseverance. He also mentioned that most of the songs were influenced by his father's ordeal, which can be recognised through the album's lyrical content. The album received positive reviews from numerous music critics. "Read Between the Lines" received ratings of 4/5 on PakMediaRevolution and 3.75/4 on the IAMEntertainment magazine.

Subsequently, the track "Pretend to Be" was chosen as the promotional single for the album and was released on MTV Pakistan in 2010. The video was directed by Parwez and the track won three awards at the Indie Music Channel Awards 2012.

=== Singles and awards (2010–2014) ===
Hayat has released three singles after the release of the album on his website. The tracks were titled "Inside, Outside", "Mend to Break" and "What Makes Me Happy". During 2011, he reached the semi-finals and finals for the songs "Pretend to Be" and "Show Me Something Real" respectively on The UK Songwriting Contest.

In February 2013, Hayat reached the semi-finals for in the genre of "Unsigned Only" and "Adult Contemporary" for "Pretend to Be" and "What Makes Me Happy", respectively.

During the spring of 2012, Hayat's track "Pretend to Be" won three of the four awards at the annual Indie Music Channel Awards.

=== Above the Fray (2014) ===
Hayat released his second album Above the Fray on 4 February 2014.

== Discography ==
=== Album ===
- Read Between the Lines (2009)
- Above the Fray (2014)

=== Singles ===
Year	Single	Peak chart positions	Album
Year	Single	PK IM Top Ten	Album
2004	"Never Change"	3	Single
2010	"Pretend to Be"	–	Read Between the Lines
2015	"Happy Sober"	–	Single
"–" denotes a release that did not chart.

== Awards and nominations ==
Year	Event	Prize	Nominated work	Result
2005	Indus Music Awards	Best Début	Never Change	Nominated
2011	The UK Songwriting Contest	Rock (semi-finalist)	Pretend to Be	Nominated
2011	The UK Songwriting Contest	Rock (finalist)	Some Me Something Real	Nominated
2012	Indie Music Channel Awards	Best Alternative Song	Pretend to Be	Nominated
2012	Indie Music Channel Awards	Recording of the Year	Pretend to Be	Nominated
2012	Indie Music Channel Awards	Video of the Year	Pretend to Be	Nominated
2012	Indie Music Channel Awards	Artist of the Year	Pretend to Be	Nominated
2012	Indie Music Channel Awards	Best Male Alternative Artist	Pretend to Be	Won
2012	Indie Music Channel Awards	Best Alternative Recording	Pretend to Be	Won
2012	Indie Music Channel Awards	Best Alternative Video Under $5,000	Pretend to Be	Won
2012	International Songwriting Competition	Unsigned Only (semi-finalist)	Pretend to Be	Nominated
2012	International Songwriting Competition	Adult Contemporary (3rd position)	What Makes Me Happy	Won
2013	Indie Music Channel Awards	Best Alternative Song	Read Between the Lines	Won
2013	Indie Music Channel Awards	Best Alternative Song	Never Change	Nominated
2013	Indie Music Channel Awards	Best Alternative Song	I Remember	Nominated
2013	Indie Music Channel Awards	Best Rock Demo	Bringing Me Down	Nominated
2013	Indie Music Channel Awards	Best Rock Demo	Penny Eyes	Nominated
2013	Indie Music Channel Awards	Best Rock Demo	Frozen Waters	Nominated
2014	Indie Music Channel Awards	Best Rock Song	Riddling Rhymes	Nominated
2016	Youth Recognition Awards	Youth Recognition Award	Pretend to Be	Won

== See also ==
- List of alumni of the University of York
- List of composers
- List of heavy metal guitarists
- List of Pakistani musicians
- List of people from Peshawar
- Music of Pakistan
- Pashto music
