= Abdul Latif Galadari =

Emirati businessman (1939-2002)

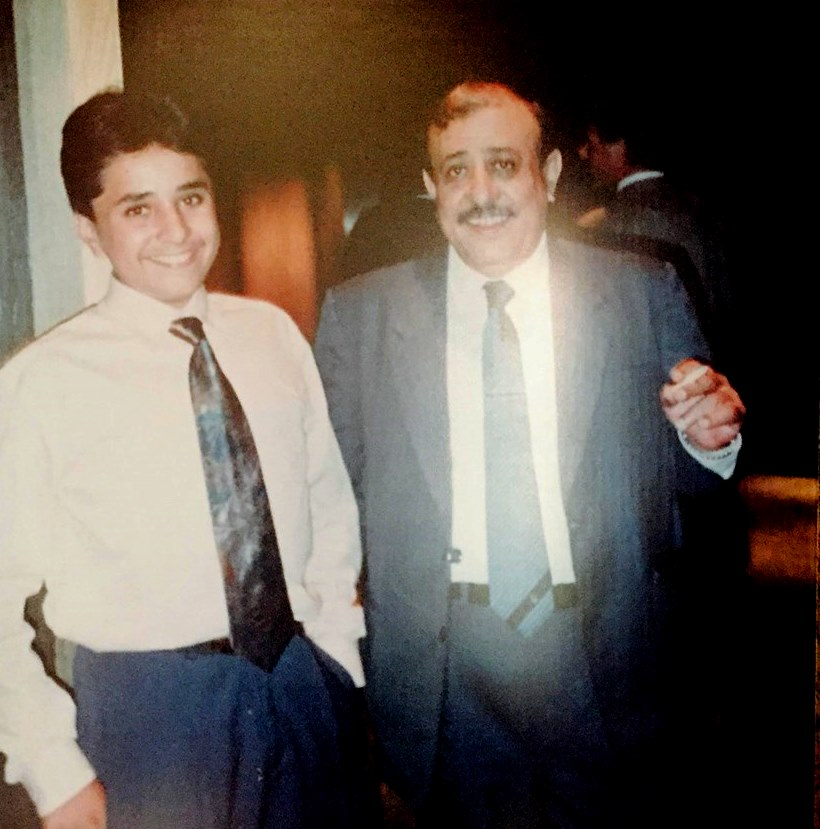
- Abdul Latif Galadari (right) with son Suhail Galadari
- Born: Abdul Latif Ebrahim Galadari; 1939; Iran
- Died: 9 March 2002 (aged 62–63); Karachi, Pakistan
- Education: UAE
- Occupation: Head of "Galadari Brothers LLC"
- Known for: Investments, industry, media outlets (most notably Khaleej Times)
- Relatives: Suhail Galadari (son), Mohammed Abdul Latif Galadari (son), Ibrahim Abdul Latif Galadari (son)

Abdul Latif Galadari (1939 – 9 March 2002) was an Emirati businessman. He was the youngest son of Ibrahim Galadari. Abdul Latif, Along with his elder brother, Abdul Rahim, headed the Galadari Group, a business group.

== Personal life ==
Abdul Latif Galadari was born in 1939 in Iran, as the youngest son of Ebrahim Galadari and grandson of merchant Hassan Galadari. The business tradition stretched as far back as his grandfather, Hassan Galadari, who was a businessman in 1879. As a young man, Abdul Latif Galadari studied in UAE.

== Business ==
The Galadari Brothers Group was founded by Abdul Rahim E. Galadari, Abdul Latif E. Galadari, and Abdul Wahab E. Galadari in the early 1960s. This group established a number of companies. The three brothers were also involved in the gold business, which had made them multimillionaires by the 1970s. Abdul Latif Galadari and his two brothers were well placed to take advantage of Dubai's 1970s Oil Boom. Together they started a major conglomerate, building the Intercontinental Hotel, opening Dubai Bank, establishing a Mazda Vehicle Dealership, starting Dubai's first English Language Daily Newspaper - the Khaleej Times - and opening a string of construction, engineering, and trading companies.

He also started GICC, which is the flagship company of the Galadari Brothers Group. GICC is the master franchisee for the Baskin-Robbins brand in the GCC, and is the world's largest franchisee for Baskin-Robbins with close to 700 stores spread across the UAE, Saudi Arabia, Oman, Bahrain, Qatar and Kuwait. GICC has been the first company to introduce an international brand of ice cream in the area and has the largest store network in the Quick Service Restaurants (QSR) industry in the Persian Gulf region. The Galadari Group Head Office is in Dubai. In 2015, the Galadari Brothers ranked 27th on a Forbes list of companies in the Middle East.

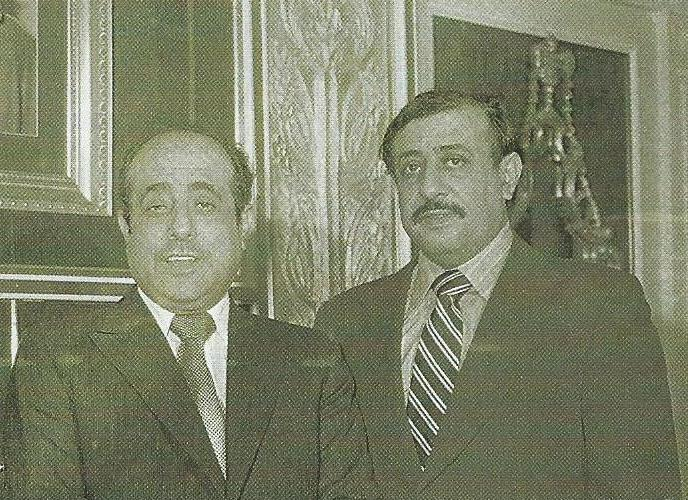
Abdul Latif Galadari (right) with brother Abdul Rahim Galadari

== Death ==
Abdul Latif Galadari died due to a heart attack at his residence in the PECHS neighbourhood of Karachi, Pakistan, at the age of 62 on 9 March 2002. The body was flown to Dubai and was buried at the Al Qouz graveyard. The funeral was attended by his nephew Mohammed Abdul Rahim Galadari, his son Suhail Galadari and members of business community, relatives and friends.
