= Silent Nation =

Studio album by Asia
- Released: 31 August 2004
- Studios: Clear Lake Audio, North Hollywood, Los Angeles
- Genres: Progressive rock; album-oriented rock
- Length: 58:20
- Label: Inside Out Music
- Producer: John Payne

Asia chronology
Aura (2001)	Silent Nation (2004)	Fantasia: Live in Tokyo (2007)

Singles from Silent Nation
- 1. "Long Way from Home" Released: 10 January 2005

Silent Nation is the ninth studio album by English rock supergroup Asia, released in 2004. It was the last album with longtime vocalist and bassist John Payne, prior to the reunion of the original line-up in 2006.

== Production ==
Silent Nation was recorded at Clear Lake Audio in North Hollywood, Los Angeles, and produced, engineered and mixed solely by Payne. The album features a stable line-up consisting of Payne, keyboard player Geoff Downes, guitarist Guthrie Govan and drummer Chris Slade, which had been achieved during Aura (2001) sessions. Early writing sessions were with guitarist and future member Billy Sherwood and drummer Jay Schellen. Eventually, two songs, "Ghost in the Mirror" and "I Will Be There for You", co-written by Sherwood, made the final album. "Darkness Day" and "The Prophet" were initially announced as "The Sun Don't Shine" and "Sail Away", respectively. An early track listing included "Long and Lonely Ride", but it was not finished in time. The main lyricist for Silent Nation was Payne. The lyrics are essentially based around the idea of the power centralization in the modern world, disfranchising the general public.

The album finally broke the tradition of naming Asia studio recordings with a word beginning and ending with the letter 'a'. The exception is Rare (1999), a collection of instrumental music, which was composed only by Payne and Downes, and, thus, may be viewed as their solo album. Silent Nation is also the first album to feature a photograph, not an illustration, as was Asia's trademark.

== Release ==
Silent Nation was released on 31 August 2004 by Inside Out Music on CD and special edition CD/DVD-Video (featuring the making of the album). In Japan, it became available on 22 September 2004 through Victor and featured "Rise" as a bonus track.

== Reception ==
The reviews for Silent Nation were mixed to positive. Eleni Mouratoglou wrote a glowing review for Metal Temple in 2004: "Talent, maturity, inspiration. The judgment seemed hard in the beginning. But now there is only one thing left to say. The title does not start with an “A any more but I give them an A+. Long Live Asia!" Steve Pettengill gave the album 3 1/2 stars out of 5 on Sea of Tranquility, stating "I'm not exactly sure who or what constitutes an Asia audience these days, but for those who have been following the band through the years, they should be pleased with Silent Nation. It's much better than the schmaltzy Aura album of 2001. Though better cover art (where's Roger Dean?!) might help sales, Asia are not out of the game yet." Alfonso Algora of review site Progvisions also saw the album as decent, writing "Although you could think the album is not worthy after looking at the rating, I think old Asia fans could give this band a chance after the latest fiascos. Of course those who don´t like easy-to-listen progressive (¿?) sounds won´t be happy with this album. But if you like Asia, Saga and that kind of bands that blend mainstream (pop or AOR) with progressive sounds, and you thought that Asia was finished as a good band, you´ll have a good time listening to this album that it´s better, by far, than any other of Payne´s era."

== Track listing ==
All tracks are written by John Payne and Geoff Downes, except "Ghost in the Mirror" and "I Will Be There for You" written by Payne, Downes and Billy Sherwood.

No.	Title	Length
1.	"What About Love?"	5:25
2.	"Long Way from Home"	6:01
3.	"Midnight"	6:24
4.	"Blue Moon Monday"	7:17
5.	"Silent Nation"	6:04
6.	"Ghost in the Mirror"	4:38
7.	"Gone Too Far"	6:48
8.	"I Will Be There for You"	4:10
9.	"Darkness Day"	6:18
10.	"The Prophet"	5:16
Total length:		58:20

Japan bonus track
No.	Title	Length
11.	"Rise"	4:47
Total length:		63:07

== Personnel ==
=== Asia ===
- Geoff Downes – keyboards, percussion
- John Payne – vocals, guitar, bass; producer, engineer, mixing engineer
- Guthrie Govan – guitars
- Chris Slade – drums

=== Additional musicians ===
- Kim Nielsen Parsons – bass guitar (on "I Will Be There for You")
- Billy Sherwood – guitars, bass
- Ant Glynne – guitars
- Jay Schellen – drums

=== Technical personnel ===
- Eddy Schreyer – mastering engineer (at Oasis Mastering, Studio City, Los Angeles)
- Thomas Ewerhard – artwork, layout
- Robert John – photography
- Gene Kirkland – photography
- Ace Trump – live photography
- Billy White – digital art
- Roger Dean – Asia logotype

== Charts ==
Chart (2004)	Peak position
German Albums (Offizielle Top 100)	77
