= Built to Perform =

Studio album by Phantom Blue
- Released: 1993
- Recorded: Total Access Recording, Redondo Beach, California, Rumbo Recorders, Canoga Park, California, Skip Saylor Recording, Hollywood
- Genre: Heavy metal
- Length: 41:56
- Label: Geffen (US); Roadrunner (Europe and Japan)
- Producer: Max Norman

Phantom Blue chronology
Phantom Blue (1989)	Built to Perform (1993)	Prime Cuts & Glazed Donuts (1995)

Professional ratings
Review scores
Source	Rating
AllMusic	1.5/5 stars
Collector's Guide to Heavy Metal	8/10
Kerrang!	4/5 stars
Metal Hammer	2/5 stars
Rock Hard	8/10

Built to Perform is the second and last full-length album by American heavy metal band Phantom Blue. In contrast to the first album's glam metal sound, Built to Perform displays a more raw, heavy metal sound. It also features songwriting credits by all five of the band members plus former member Nicole Couch, who left prior to the album's release. The album includes the band's cover of Thin Lizzy's "Bad Reputation."

Veteran producer Max Norman oversaw the album's production, while Marty Friedman (who was then with Megadeth) and John Norum (of Europe) contributed as guest guitarists. Norum and guitarist Michelle Meldrum eventually married in 1995. "My Misery" was co-written by West Arkeen, known for his collaborations with Guns N' Roses.

Released by Geffen Records, this was the band's only album under a major record label.

== Track listing ==
No.	Title	Writer(s)	Length
1.	"Nothing Good"	Michelle Meldrum; Nicole Couch; Linda McDonald; Kim Nielsen; Couch	3:28
2.	"Time to Run"	Meldrum; Karen Kreutzer; Gigi Hangach; John Norum; Glenn Hughes	4:18
3.	"Bad Reputation" (Thin Lizzy cover)	Phil Lynott; Brian Downey; Scott Gorham	2:31
4.	"My Misery"	Meldrum; Couch; West Arkeen	3:44
5.	"Little Man"	McDonald; Couch	3:29
6.	"Better Off Dead"	Meldrum; Kreutzer; McDonald	3:48
7.	"Anti Love Crunch"	McDonald; Kreutzer; Hangach	3:07
8.	"Loved Ya to Pieces"	Meldrum; Couch	3:12
9.	"So Easy"	Meldrum; Couch	3:32
10.	"Lied to Me"	Meldrum; Couch	3:15
11.	"A Little Evil"	Meldrum; McDonald; Nielsen; Couch	3:05
12.	"You're Free"	Meldrum; Couch	4:26
Total length:			41:56

== Personnel ==
Phantom Blue

- Gigi Hangach – vocals
- Michelle Meldrum – guitars
- Karen Kreutzer – guitar
- Kim Nielsen – bass guitar
- Linda McDonald – drums

Additional musicians

- Marty Friedman - guitar on "A Little Evil"
- John Norum - guitar on "Better Off Dead"
- A.T Das - In studio additional guitar

Production

- Max Norman - producer, engineer, mixing
- George Marino - mastering
