= Phantom Blue (album) =

Studio album by Phantom Blue
- Released: July 17, 1989
- Studio: Prairie Sun Recording Studios in Cotati, California
- Genres: Heavy metal; hard rock; glam metal
- Length: 31:11
- Label: Shrapnel
- Producers: Steve Fontano; Marty Friedman; Peter Marrino

Phantom Blue chronology
Phantom Blue (1989)	Built to Perform (1993)

Alternative Cover
- Roadrunner Records edition

Singles from Phantom Blue
- 1. "Why Call It Love?" / "Fought It Out" Released: 1989

Professional ratings
Review scores
Source	Rating
Collector's Guide to Heavy Metal	8/10
Kerrang!	4/5 stars
Metal Forces	90/100
Metal Hammer	4/5 stars
Raw	7/10
Rock Hard	6.5/10

Phantom Blue is the debut studio album by American heavy metal band Phantom Blue, released in 1989 through Shrapnel Records (United States) and Roadrunner Records (Europe and Japan). Guitarist Marty Friedman, at the time a member of the band Cacophony, and later of Megadeth, is credited as a co-producer. According to drummer Linda McDonald, the music video for "Why Call It Love?" was filmed within a maximum security prison in Carson City, Nevada.

The album was remastered and reissued by Lost and Found Records in 2026.

== Track listing ==
Side one
No.	Title	Writer(s)	Length
1.	"Going Mad"	Nicole Couch	3:25
2.	"Last Shot"	Michelle Meldrum	3:24
3.	"Why Call It Love?"	Steve Fontano; Jerry Marquez	4:13
4.	"Frantic Zone"	Couch	3:29
5.	"Slow It Down"	Couch	3:21

Side two
No.	Title	Writer(s)	Length
6.	"Walking Away"	Couch; Fontano	3:31
7.	"Fought It Out"	Couch	2:47
8.	"Never Too Late"	Fontano; Marty Friedman; Couch; Meldrum	3:31
9.	"Out of Control"	Meldrum; Friedman	3:30
Total length:			31:11

== Personnel ==
Phantom Blue

- Gigi Hangach – lead vocals, background vocals
- Nicole Couch – guitar, background vocals
- Michelle Meldrum – guitar, background vocals
- Kim Nielsen – bass
- Linda McDonald – drums

Additional musicians

- Mike Mani, Dan Meblin – keyboards
- Jennifer Hall – background vocals

Production

- Steve Fontano – producer, engineer
- Marty Friedman – producer
- Peter Marrino – vocal arrangement (tracks 2, 5–7, 9), producer (tracks 2, 5–7, 9)
- George Horn – mastering at Fantasy Studios, Berkeley, California
- Joe Marquez, Marc Reyburn – production assistance
