= Prime Cuts & Glazed Donuts =

Demo album by Phantom Blue
- Released: 1995
- Genre: Heavy metal
- Length: 53:30
- Label: Self-released

Phantom Blue chronology
Built to Perform (1993)	Prime Cuts & Glazed Donuts (1995)	Caught Live! (1997)

Prime Cuts & Glazed Donuts is a collection of previously recorded demos released by manager Mark Dawson and Linda McDonald of the American all-female heavy metal band Phantom Blue. Michelle Meldrum and Nicole Couch and bassist Kim Nielsen were no longer in the band, but played on all tracks minus "Saturday Morning Brain Damage" that featured founding member Debra Armstrong. The tracks were recorded by the original members during their pre-production days with Geffen Records. "Strange Blue Mercy" and "Mutha" were originally released in the "My Misery" single in 1993.

== Track listing ==
All songs written by Michelle Meldrum and Nicole Couch except where indicated.

No.	Title	Writer(s)	Length
1.	"My Brain Hurts a Lot"		3:02
2.	"Strange Blue Mercy"		2:53
3.	"Fairies Wear Boots" (Black Sabbath cover)	Tony Iommi, Ozzy Osbourne, Geezer Butler, Bill Ward	4:35
4.	"Bad Dreams"		4:26
5.	"Strange War"	Linda McDonald, Kim Nielsen, Nicole Couch	4:06
6.	"Hangin' On"		5:36
7.	"Say a Little Prayer"		3:24
8.	"You're Not Alone"		3:50
9.	"In the Likes of You"	McDonald, Chris Haren	3:14
10.	"Mutha"		4:14
11.	"Strike Me Down"		3:39
12.	"Caught in the Fire"		4:13
13.	"Slow Suicide"		4:11
14.	"Saturday Morning Brain Damage"		2:07

== Personnel ==
Phantom Blue

- Gigi Hangach – vocals
- Michelle Meldrum – guitar
- Nicole Couch - guitar
- Kim Nielsen – bass guitar
- Linda McDonald – drums

Additional musicians

- Debra Armstrong - bass on "Saturday Morning Brain Damage"
