= Blowin' Up the Machine =

Studio album by Meldrum
- Released: May 11, 2007 (Europe); September 11, 2007 (U.S.)
- Recorded: Killer Catfight Studios, Office Studios, Oracle Post
- Genre: Heavy metal
- Length: 40:55
- Label: Locomotive Records (North America); Frontiers Records (Europe)
- Producer: Meldrum

Meldrum chronology
Loaded Mental Cannon (2001)	Blowin' Up the Machine (2007)	Lifer (2009)

Blowin' Up the Machine is the second album by the heavy metal band Meldrum, featuring a modified lineup compared to that of their 2001 debut Loaded Mental Cannon. The album features a guest appearance by Motörhead vocalist/bassist Lemmy, along with guitarist/founder Michelle Meldrum's long-time friends Gene Hoglan (of Strapping Young Lad and Dethklok) and Linda McDonald (of Phantom Blue and The Iron Maidens). A music video for "Purge" was released to promote the album.

This was the band's last album to be released while Michelle Meldrum was still alive. On May 21, 2008, she died of a cerebral hemorrhage caused by a cystic growth that restricted the flow of blood and oxygen in her brain.

== Track listing ==
No.	Title	Writer(s)	Length
1.	"Purge"	Michelle Meldrum, Frida Ståhl	4:39
2.	"Down Your Throat"	Meldrum	3:09
3.	"Scar"	Fredrik Haake, Moa Holmsten, Meldrum, Ståhl	3:39
4.	"Creme de la Creme"	Haake, Holmsten, Meldrum, Ståhl	4:45
5.	"Hang 'Em"	Holmsten, Meldrum, Ståhl	3:21
6.	"Miss Me When I'm Gone"	Holmsten, Ian Kilmister, Meldrum	3:28
7.	"Another Kind"	Dorian Cheah, Holmsten, Harry Maslin, Meldrum, Michéle Vice	3:27
8.	"Exploited"	Holmsten, Meldrum, Ståhl	3:07
9.	"Get Yours"	Cheah, Holmsten, Maslin, Meldrum, Vice	2:54
10.	"Get Me Out of Here"	Holmsten, Kilmister, Meldrum, Ståhl	5:01
11.	"Bite the Pillow"	Meldrum, Ståhl	3:20

== Personnel ==
=== Meldrum ===
- Michelle Meldrum – guitar, engineer, mixing, executive producer
- Moa Holmsten – lead vocals, producer
- Frida Ståhl – bass, backing vocals on track 10, engineer, producer

=== Additional musicians ===
- Lemmy – vocals on track 6
- Gene Hoglan – drums on tracks 1, 2, 5, 8
- Linda McDonald – drums on tracks 3, 4, 6, 7, 9, 10, 11

=== Production ===
- Brett Chassen – engineer, mixing
- Tony Naima – engineer
- Bob Kulick – mixing
- Toby Wright – mixing of tracks 7, 9, 10
