= Loaded Mental Cannon =

Studio album by Meldrum
- Released: October 22, 2001
- Genre: Heavy metal
- Length: 51:37
- Label: Record Heaven
- Producer: Michelle Meldrum, Stefan Olsson

Meldrum chronology
Loaded Mental Cannon (2001)	Blowin' Up the Machine (2007)

Loaded Mental Cannon is the debut album by the heavy metal band Meldrum. Guest appearances on the album include Brian Robertson (formerly of Thin Lizzy), Marcel Jacob (of Talisman) and founder/guitarist Michelle Meldrum's husband John Norum (of Europe).

== Track listing ==
No.	Title	Writer(s)	Length
1.	"The Story of Junk"	Michelle Meldrum, Frida Ståhl	3:12
2.	"Aspartame"	Meldrum, Hasse Sjölander	4:00
3.	"Feeding the Hope"	Meldrum, Kelly Keeling	4:04
4.	"Through Shattered Eyes"	Meldrum, Ståhl, Sjölander, Moa Holmsten	5:12
5.	"Feeling Small"	Meldrum, Ståhl	3:31
6.	"Chaos"	Meldrum, Ståhl	4:21
7.	"Two Lost Worlds"	Meldrum, Ståhl, Sjölander	6:32
8.	"Brake"	Meldrum, Keeling	4:20
9.	"Attakapa"	Meldrum, Keeling	4:53
10.	"New World Order"	Meldrum, Keeling, Karen Kreutzer	4:18
11.	"Crossin the Line"	Meldrum, Ståhl	3:09
12.	"Reign Mantra"	Meldrum, Keeling	4:05

== Personnel ==
=== Band members ===
- Michelle Meldrum – guitar
- Moa Holmsten - lead vocals
- Frida Ståhl - bass
- Fredrik Haake - drums

=== Additional musicians ===
- John Norum - guitar solo on track 4
- Brian Robertson - guitar solo on track 9
- Marcel Jacob - bass on track 12
- Anders Fästader - sitar on track 6
- Jesper Skarin - gatam on track 12
- Jari Salonen - additional background vocals
- Stefan Olsson - percussion
- Hasse Sjölander - drums and percussion
