= Suhail Galadari =

Emirati businessman (born 1977)

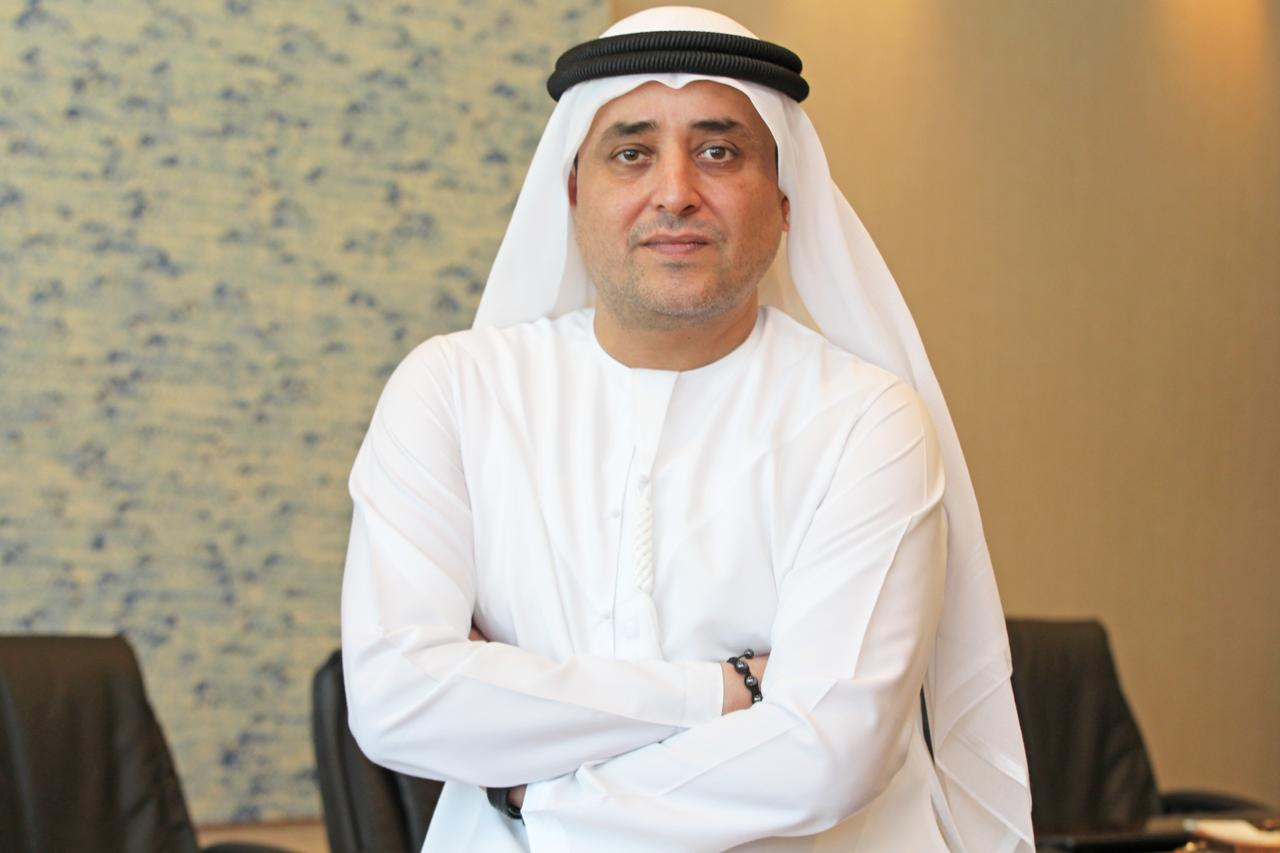
- Emirati businessman Suhail Abdul Latif Galadari in his Dubai office in 2018. Photo courtesy: Khaleej Times
- Born: Suhail Abdul Latif Galadari; 8 July 1977 (age 49); Dubai, United Arab Emirates
- Education: Al Mawakeb School (Dubai); Brighton College (London)
- Occupation: Director at Galadari Brothers
- Known for: Investments, industry, media outlets (most notably Khaleej Times)
- Relatives: Abdul Latif Galadari (father)

Suhail Abdul Latif Galadari (Arabic: سهيل عبد اللطيف كلداري) (born July 8, 1977) is an Emirati businessman. He is a Co-Chairman at Galadari Brothers. He is a shareholder via Galadari Printing and Publishing in Khaleej Times, the UAE's Dubai-headquartered English newspaper. Galadari Brothers LLC has investments in other sectors, as well.

== Biography ==
Suhail Galadari is the eldest son of the late Abdul Latif Al Galadari. He completed a part of his education in Dubai (UAE) and London (UK).

Bollywood actors like Ranbir Kapoor, Saif Ali Khan, Akshay Kumar, Salman Khan, Amitabh Bachchan often visit him in the Dubai headquarters of Khaleej Times. Akshay Kumar, Kajal, Anupam Kher promoted Special 26 movie in Dubai with Galadari and his newspaper. He welcomed Saif Ali Khan and Kareena Kapoor in Khaleej Times headquarters on 7 November 2009. Bollywood films and Indian music videos have featured his newspaper and its website and he has also granted permission to Bollywood actor Shah Rukh Khan to use his SL65 Black Series in the film Happy New Year.

Suhail lives in Dubai, UAE, and his group spearhead Khaleej Times was the media partner of Peshawar Zalmi cricket team, which won the 2017 Pakistan Super League title after defeating Quetta Gladiators in Lahore in March. Suhail Galadari also co-owns the Benoni ZALMI SA team franchise.
