= Mirawas =

Pakistani stand-up comedian (1955–2025)

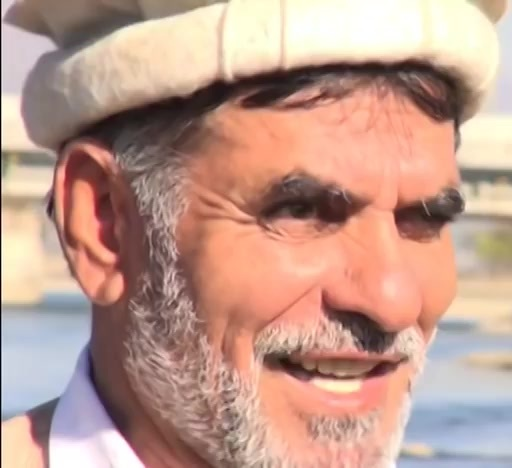
- Mirawas in 2015
- Born: Hayatullah Khan; 1955; Tangi, Pakistan
- Died: 3 April 2025 (aged 69–70); Tangi, Pakistan

Comedy career
- Years active: 1970–2024
- Genre: Comedy

Hayatullah Khan (1955 – 3 April 2025), known professionally as Mirawas (Urdu: میراوس), was a Pakistani stand-up comedian and singer known for his social commentary. During his career spanning six decades, he appeared on numerous television and radio shows and produced over 500 cassettes and 800 comedy albums. His later years were marked by financial struggles and health challenges.

== Early life ==
Born as Hayatullah Khan in Tangi, Charsadda, Mirawas began telling jokes in his childhood. By the ninth grade, he hosted weekly joke sessions for schoolchildren, earning a local reputation as a comic. Hailing from a farming family, he often entertained labourers and farmers with impromptu performances which were known for blended humour with social commentary.

== Career ==
Mirawas's more widespread career as a comedian began in the 1980s. During the decade, he campaigned on PTV against drug addiction.

He appeared in numerous shows, radio and TV programmes, and performed abroad on stage in about 20 countries.

After retirement, he ran the roadside Mirawas Hotel in Ghazi Beg in the Mohmand Agency tribal area.

== Literary work ==
Mirawas authored two books, the first of which was published in the 1980s. His second book, Gap da Mirawas, included "parodies of famous Pashto and Urdu songs", and "satiric and humorous poems".

== Social impact and style ==
Mirawas's comedy was typically unscripted and often included commentary relied on real-life observations. His jokes often targeted social ills, from drug addiction to academic pressure.

On the importance of comedy, Mirawas, said, "An hour of fun can erase months of depression. Even children go to school with slumped faces—we've forgotten to laugh."

== Later life and death ==
In his later years, Mirawas suffered from diabetes and kidney disease. A 2024 appeal for medical aid revealed his financial struggles, though he ultimately received donations from fans and peers. He died in Tangi, Charsadda on 3 April 2025.

Aftab Sherpao, leader of the Qaumi Watan Party, called his death a "loss to satire," praising his ability to "highlight societal flaws with laughter". Khyber Pakhtunkhwa Governor Faisal Karim Kundi also expressed his condolences on his death. Fans likened him to the "Umer Sharif of Pashto," lamenting inadequate institutional support for his art.

== See also ==
- Syed Rahman Shino
- Ismail Shahid
