= Mohammed Ali Jamin =

Qatari professional footballer (born 2000)

Personal information
- Full name: Mohammed Ali Rahman Jamin
- Date of birth: 28 February 2000 (age 26)
- Place of birth: Doha, Qatar
- Height: 1.80 m (5 ft 11 in)
- Position: Defender

Team information
- Current team: Muaither

Youth career
- 2017–2020: Al-Gharafa

Senior career*
Years	Team	Apps	(Gls)
2020–2024	Al-Gharafa	2	(0)
2025–	Muaither	0	(0)
- * Club domestic league appearances and goals as of 17:17, 17 August 2023 (UTC)

Mohammed Ali Rahman Jamin (born 28 February 2000), commonly known as Ali Syahrian Tampo, is a Qatari professional footballer who plays as a defender for Qatar Stars League club Muaither.

== Career statistics ==
=== Club ===
As of 17 August 2023

Club	Season	League		Cup (Note: Includes Qatar FA Cup)		Other (Note: Appearances in the Qatari Stars Cup)		Total	
Club	Season	Apps	Goals	Apps	Goals	Apps	Goals	Apps	Goals
Al-Gharafa	2018–19	0	0	0	0	0	0	0	0
Al-Gharafa	2019–20	0	0	0	0	2	0	2	0
Al-Gharafa	2020–21	0	0	1	0	0	0	1	0
Al-Gharafa	2021–22	0	0	0	0	1	0	1	0
Al-Gharafa	2022–23	1	0	0	0	0	0	1	0
Al-Gharafa	2023–24	1	0	0	0	0	0	1	0
Career total		2	0	1	0	3	0	6	0
