= Khaleej Times =

Daily English language newspaper in the UAE

- Type: Daily newspaper
- Format: Broadsheet
- Owners: Suhail Galadari (Co-Chairman); Mohammed Galadari (Co-Chairman)
- Publisher: Galadari Printing and Publishing
- President: Charles Yardley
- Editor-in-chief: Ted Kemp
- Founded: 16 April 1978; 48 years ago
- Language: English
- Headquarters: Dubai, United Arab Emirates
- OCLC number: 60637427
- Website: khaleejtimes.com

Khaleej Times is a daily English language digital and multimedia news organization and daily newspaper published in Dubai, United Arab Emirates. Launched on 16 April 1978, Khaleej Times is the UAE's longest-running English daily newspaper.

== History and profile ==
A partnership between the UAE government, the Galadari Brothers and the Dawn Media Group in Pakistan began publishing the daily on 16 April 1978, making it the first English daily in the UAE. The founding team consisted of Mahmoud Haroon, Muzammil Ahmed, M.J. Zahedi, Malcolm Payne (the first editor-in-chief) and Iqbal Noorie (in charge of circulation). They were soon joined by Patrick Heyland who was in charge of advertising and promotion.

The editorial staff of the paper includes multiple nationalities, mostly from the Indian subcontinent (India, Pakistan, Bangladesh and Sri Lanka), but also Emiratis, Arabs from the wider region (notably Egyptians, Syrians, Jordanians and Lebanese), Britons and Filipinos. The broadsheet comprises the general news section, City Times (lifestyle and entertainment), a business section, a sports section, the WKND magazine, and a classifieds section (Buzzon). The newspaper also consists of special reports and supplements which allow for community advertisements and other services. Its main competitors are The National, Gulf News and, formerly, 7days, which closed in December 2016.

In September 2020, Khaleej Times introduced a free news subscription service on Telegram, sending daily news updates to its subscribers. On 1 June 2023, Khaleej Times, in an editorial published on its front page, announced that it will stop its print edition on weekends starting from 3 June 2023.

Khaleej Times named Charles Yardley CEO in September 2024 as part of an effort to improve innovation and create revenue growth. Yardley previously was CEO of London's Evening Standard.

Ted Kemp joined Khaleej Times as chief content officer in May 2025. Kemp had experience in Asia, the Middle East, Europe and North America for CNBC Digital, where he was international managing editor.

== KTplus ==
KTplus (stylized as KT+), which launched in late 2024, is the digital content and social media production unit of Khaleej Times. The unit produces short-form videos, interviews, digital series, and social storytelling for platforms such as Instagram and YouTube.

Khaleej Times media director Ahmad Nokari conceptualized and developed KTplus as part of Khaleej Times' strategy to modernize its digital presence. Nokari originated an idea for a dedicated in-house social media unit and studio and led the creation of its identity, content formats, and production systems.

The KTplus launch came as part of a wider effort by Khaleej Times to migrate toward being a digital-first news organization. Khaleej Times maintains separate social media accounts for the news part of organization, with more than 1.1 million followers on Instagram.

== KT Luxe ==
In March 2025, Khaleej Times launched KTLuxe as a weekend business and lifestyle magazine overseen by features editor Anamika Chatterjee. While the national daily is focused on local news, Luxe takes a more global approach to storytelling. Some of its contributors include Emmy-winning journalist Patti Domm, global personal finance guru Suze Orman, and The Telegraph contributing writer Melanie Swan, among others.

== Redesign of Site and Organizational Structure ==
On 29 January 2026, Khaleej Times launched a new, cleaner and more easily navigable website to usher in a new organizational structure that launched the following month. The new structure, introduced by Chief Content Officer Ted Kemp, is designed to serve five core content areas: UAE, World, Business, Tech and Life.

== Digital Audience ==
As of February 2026, Khaleej Times had a monthly digital reach of 37.2 million consumers.

They include 6.5 million monthly website users, 3.2 million Instagram followers, 21.7 million Facebook users and more than 1 million followers on X, with the balance on other digital platforms.
