= Wraith (band) =

Wraith was a hard rock band formed in Nottingham, UK, in 1987. It was initially signed to Warhammer Records. It was made up of five members.

== History ==
The band released its sixth album, Revelation, in 2017.

== Discography ==
- "Lonely" (single, 1987)
- Naked Aggression (EP, 1989)
- Danger Calling (1992)
- Riot (1993)
- Cursed (EP, 1993)
- Schizophrenia (1996)
- Evolution (2006)
- Revelation (2017)
