= Syed Rahman Shino =

Pakistani actor, host and stand-up comedian

- Sheno
- Born: Saeed Rahman
- Occupations: Actor; host; standup comedian
- Years active: 1972 – present
- Notable work: "Sheno Meno Show" AVT Khayber "Sa MaMa Lewane Sa Hwraye Lewane"
- Awards: Tamgha-e-Imtiaz (2012); Fakhar-e-Peshawar (2017)

Syed Rahman Shino (Urdu: سید رحمان شینو) is a Pashto Pakistani actor, host and stand-up comedian.

== Career ==
Shino used to drive a rickshaw in Peshawar, one day he was searching for riders when encountered by Peshawar Radio officials and took him to the studio and started working. Shino performed for long time alongside Ismail Shahid. He is also co-host of Sheeno Meeno Show at AVT Khyber.

He has performed in many pushto Pakistani dramas and films tribute to him. He currently hosts Shino meeno show on avt khyber. His grandson name is Umar khan and Behram Khan.

== Awards ==
- Tamgha-e-Imtiaz (2012)
- Fakhar-e-Peshawar (2017)

== See also ==
- Mirawas
- Ismail Shahid
