= Doug Marks =

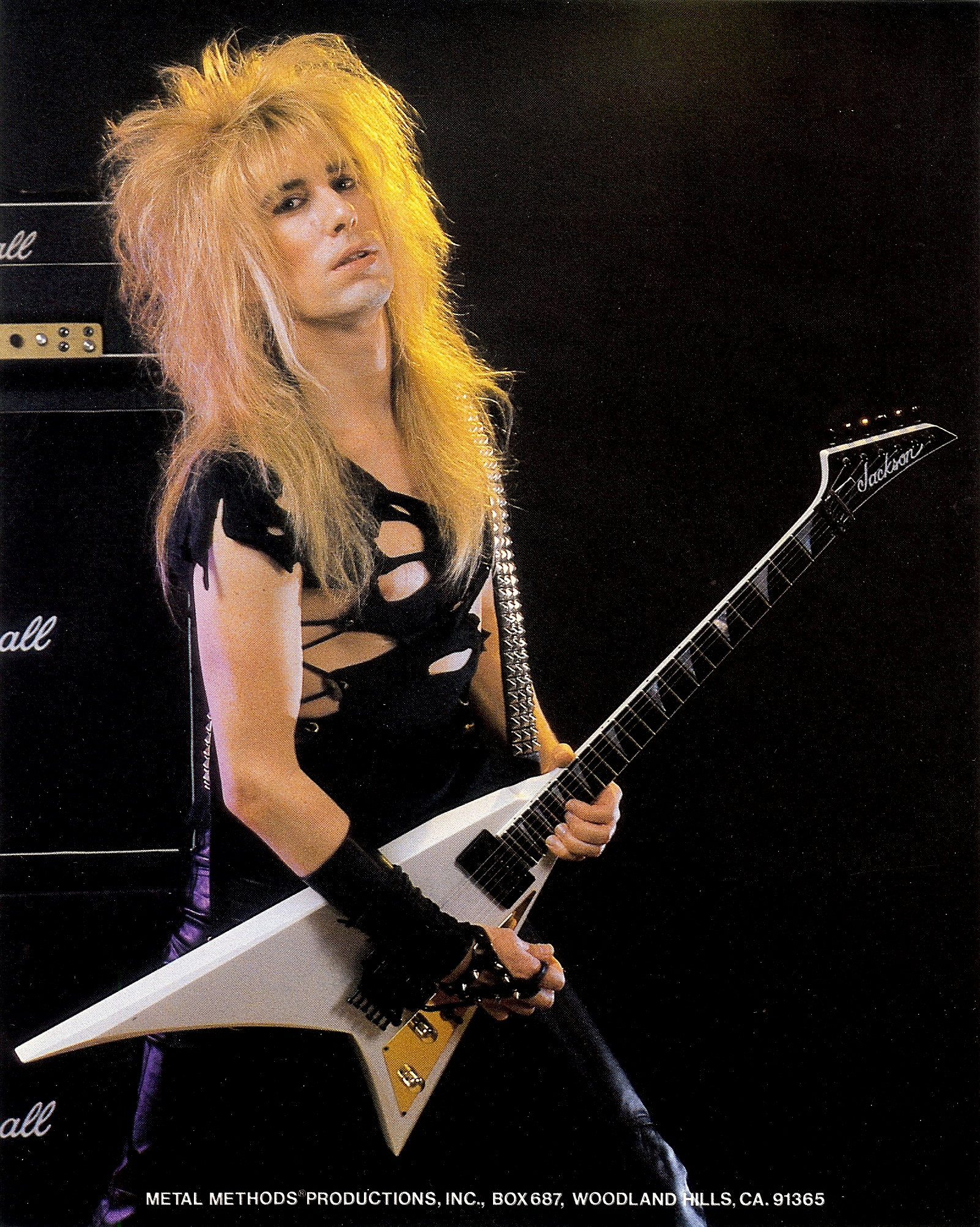

Background information
- Occupations: Guitarist, Guitar instructor, Owner of Metal Method Guitar Lessons
- Instruments: Guitar, bass

Doug Marks is a musician, guitarist and guitar instructor.

He is the founder and owner of Metal Method Video guitar lessons. Marks founded Metal Method in 1982. Metal Method is both one of the longest established and worlds most popular video guitar lessons having taught well over 100,000 guitarists to date.

== Biography ==
=== Early career ===
Marks began teaching guitar students via one-on-one instruction in Denver, Colorado. After relocating to Los Angeles, California to pursue a music career leading the hard rock band Hawk, his prior students requested continued instruction, necessitating a long-distance teaching methodology by postal mail. This gave rise to the first versions of Marks' lessons-by-cassette-tape.

Marks' rock band performing in Hollywood, California included Lonnie Vincent (BulletBoys) on bass guitar and Scott Travis (Judas Priest, Racer X) on drums. Marks later released the first Hawk album independently, featuring David Fefolt on vocals, and Matt Sorum (Motörhead, Guns N' Roses, Velvet Revolver) on drums.

=== Metal Method ===
Marks pioneered the "study at home" method of guitar instruction throughout the 1980s by developing a mail-order business delivering music instruction via audio cassette tapes and VHS video tapes. The business model focused on lower price lessons with a high volume of sales.

Prominent musicians Myles Kennedy (Alter Bridge and Slash), Rusty Cooley (Outworld) and Mike Chlasciak (Halford) have cited learning to play guitar using Metal Method guitar lessons. Metal Method was advertised in popular guitar magazines such as Hit Parader and Circus Magazine in the 1980s and 1990s.

In addition to the original Complete Basic Course and Classic Licks programs, Marks has added newer instructional programs such as Speed & Accuracy and Memorizing Note Names.

Metal Method includes other professional music instructors' lessons, including Michael Angelo Batio (Holland, Nitro and Solo Artist), Jim Gillette, Dan Mumm, Sarah Spisak, Dee J Nelson (Dope), Will Flaherty, Dave Bates and Tracy Longo (Guitar Tech to the stars).

== Discography ==
=== Early instructional courses ===
- Complete Basic Course - 1983 version (1983)
- Hawk Song Lessons 1986

=== With Hawk ===
- Hawk (1986)
- Let the Metal Live (1985)

== Videography ==
- Complete Basic Course - 1992 version
- Complete Basic Course- 2006 version
- Complete Basic Course With Classic Metal Licks
- Classic Guitar Licks
- Songwriting Course
