= Muhammed Rahman =

Australian electrical engineer

Muhammed Rahman is an electrical engineer at the University of New South Wales, Australia. He was named a Fellow of the Institute of Electrical and Electronics Engineers (IEEE) in 2014 for his contributions to direct torque control of integrated permanent magnet machines.
