= Galadari Hotel =

Luxury hotel in Sri Lanka

- Logo of the hotel

- Galadari Hotel is located in Colombo Fort, Bank of Ceylon and World Trade Center Colombo in the background
- Former names: Galadari Meridien Colombo (1984-1992); Colombo Marriott Hotel (1992-1994)

General information
- Type: Hotel
- Town or city: Colombo
- Country: Sri Lanka
- Opened: 1984; 41 years ago

Other information
- Number of rooms: 450
- Number of restaurants: 4
- Number of bars: 1

Website
- www.galadarihotel.lk

Company
- Company type: Public
- Traded as: CSE: GHLL.N0000
- ISIN: LK0067N00005
- Industry: Hospitality
- Key people: M. A. I. Galadari (Chairman); Sampath Siriwardhana (General Manager)
- Revenue: ▲LKR1,183 million (2022)
- Operating income: ▲LKR(264) million (2022)
- Net income: ▲LKR(117) million (2022)
- Total assets: ▲LKR10,535 million (2022)
- Total equity: ▼LKR8,103 million (2022)
- Number of employees: ▲481 (2022)
- Parent: Galadari Brothers (63.57%)

Galadari Hotel, traded as Galadari Hotels (Lanka) PLC, is a five-star luxury hotel in Colombo, Sri Lanka. Emirati conglomerate, Galadari Brothers are the controlling shareholders of the hotel company. The hotel commenced operations in 1984. The hotel was previously managed by Meridien Hotels and Marriott before the Galadari Brothers themselves took over the management in 1994. The hotel suffered from a couple of terrorist attacks in the 1990s most notably in 1997. In 2022, the hotel won the Hotel Brand of the Year award at the SLIM-Kantar Peoples Awards.

== History ==
Galadari Hotels (Lanka) was incorporated in 1980 and the hotel opened in 1984, managed by Meridien Hotels as the Galadari Meridien Colombo. Marriott Hotels & Resorts assumed management in 1992 and the hotel was renamed the Colombo Marriott Hotel.

On 8 April 1994, a bomb planted in the men's restroom of the Colombo Marriott exploded. Bombs also exploded in Mount Lavinia beach, the Taj Samudra Hotel and the Hotel Sapphire in the same attack. The explosion killed one man, who was identified as a perpetrator by the police. However, the attack injured several people and caused minor damage to the hotels. The Ellalan Force, a Tamil militant group claimed responsibility for the attack. Despite the attack, some 5,000 visitors were attracted to an American trade fair held from 31 May-2 June 1994 in the hotel. The Galadari Brothers, the owning company of the hotel, took over direct management of the property from Marriott in 1994 and it was renamed the Galadari Hotel.

On 15 October 1997, cadres of LTTE launched an attack on the World Trade Center Colombo (WTC). Security of the World Trade Center was tight from three sides, except for the south portion where it was located next to the parking lot of the Galadari Hotel. Five suicide bombers drove a truck filled with explosives to the parking lot of the hotel and fired upon unarmed guards on duty and killed three. Then the suicide bombers drove up to the wall of the WTC and detonated the explosives. The explosion damaged the WTC and the hotel substantially.

In 2012, the hotel company met with a substantial capital loss. The purchase of stocks from Nawaloka Hospitals by Employee's Provident Fund amidst the hotel company making losses met with criticism. In 2019, the hotel planned to invest US$15 million in refurbishment for the first time in its 35-year history. The refurbishment was planned to cover all 450 rooms and was estimated to finish by March 2021. However, the Galadari Brothers were not satisfied with the proposed new look and architecture of the mock-up renovation. Therefore, the hotel started negotiations with Radisson Blu to rebrand the hotel. Galadari Hotel celebrated its 37th anniversary on 9 October 2021. The celebrations also included almsgiving programme in remembrance of the members of the staff who died in the 1997 bombings.

It is currently undergoing renovations. When they are completed in 2025, it will be operated by Radisson Hotels and renamed Radisson Blu Hotel, Galadari Colombo.

== Operations ==
The hotel won the brand of the year award at the SLIM-Kantar Peoples Awards in March 2022. It was the third time the hotel won the award. In May 2022, reports were circulating on social media that the hotel management has complained to the Sri Lanka Police against the anti-government protestors. As a result, the hotel started receiving social media outrage including negative reviews on Facebook and Google. The hotel responded with a clarification denying that the management did not complain against the protestors. On 9 July 2022, when the police tear-gassed the protestors the hotel sheltered protestors and provided buckets of water.

== See also ==
- List of hotels in Sri Lanka
- List of companies listed on the Colombo Stock Exchange
