= Galadari Printing and Publishing =

Galadari Printing and Publishing is a media company based in Dubai, UAE. It publishes the English-language newspaper Khaleej Times and is owned by the conglomerate Galadari Brothers, Suhail Galadari and Brothers.
