= Meldrum =

Multinational heavy metal band

- Origin: International
- Genres: Heavy metal
- Years active: 2001–2009
- Labels: Frontiers
- Past members: Michelle Meldrum; Frida Ståhl; Moa Holmsten; Fredrik Haake; Gene Hoglan; Michele Madden; Laura Christine

Meldrum was a multinational heavy metal band formed by ex-Phantom Blue guitarist Michelle Meldrum.

== History ==
American guitarist Michelle Meldrum started her first band Wargod with Strapping Young Lad drummer Gene Hoglan, later going on to form Phantom Blue, with whom she released two albums and an EP between 1989 and 1993.

Meldrum was formed in Sweden in late 1999 with Hasse Sjölander on the drums, who was later replaced by Fredrik Haake. They recorded their debut album Loaded Mental Cannon in 2000, but due to trouble with the record company, the album was not released until 2001. Guest musicians included Brian Robertson, Marcel Jacob and John Norum, who was also Michelle's husband.

In 2005 they toured for three months with Zakk Wylde's Black Label Society, appearing in sold out venues across the United States and Europe. In the fall of 2005 Meldrum joined Motörhead as special guests on their 30th anniversary tour throughout Europe. The band has also toured with Sepultura, Danzig, and Nashville Pussy.

Their second album, Blowin' Up the Machine (produced by Toby Wright), was released through Frontiers in Europe on May 11, 2007, and in the U.S. on September 11, 2007. Motörhead's Lemmy, Gene Hoglan, and former Phantom Blue drummer Linda McDonald all guest on the album.

On May 18, 2008, Michelle Meldrum was rushed to St. Joseph's Hospital in Burbank, California, in critical condition. Three days later, on Wednesday, May 21, she died as a result of a cystic growth that had restricted oxygen and blood flow to her brain, rendering her braindead. Michelle had just completed writing and recording Meldrum's soon-to-be-released third album Lifer with drummer Gene Hoglan, along with the group's latest additions, Michele Madden (vocals) and Laura Christine (bass). The surviving band members planned the release of the CD initially for 2009 in tribute to their fallen bandmate, but they kept the album from coming up indefinitely. On May 26, 2009, Meldrum, along with former vocalist Moa Holmsten, participated in a memorial concert in Hollywood, California, for the benefit of Michelle's family.

On November 20, 2012, Meldrum released their third and last studio album, titled Lifer, which paid tribute to Meldrum.

=== Other projects ===
Moa Holmsten was the special guest vocalist on Motörhead's 30th anniversary DVD, and recorded guest vocals for Lemmy's solo album on a song written by Dave Grohl of the Foo Fighters.

== Discography ==
- Loaded Mental Cannon (2002)
- Blowin' Up the Machine (2007)
- Lifer (2012)
