= Ismail Shahid =

Pakistani actor and comedian (born 1951)

- اسماعیل شاہد
- Born: August 17, 1951 (age 74); Utmanzai, Charsadda, KPK, Pakistan
- Other names: Manay, Mane
- Citizenship: Pakistan
- Education: Bachelor of Arts in Urdu
- Alma mater: University of Peshawar
- Occupations: Director, actor
- Years active: 1980–present
- Notable work: Jhoot Ki Aadat Nhi Mujay Urdu; Pashto دوا او دوا پینڅ (Dwa aw Dwa Pinzu); English: Two and Two makes Five, a Pashto Drama
- Awards: Pride of Performance

Ismail Shahid (born August 17, 1955) is a Pakistani TV actor, producer, director and comedian. He is best known for his comic performances in Pashto and Urdu dramas like, "Meem Zar Ma" Or it's Urdu remake "Jhoot Ki Aadat Nhi Mujay" and "Rang Pa Rang".

== Life and career ==
Ismail Shahid was born in 1955 in Utmanzai, Charsadda, Khyber Pakhtunkhwa, Pakistan. Raised in a Pashtun family, he developed an early interest in acting and storytelling. His fascination with performing arts began during his school days, where he actively participated in school plays and theater. Shahid's love for humor and satire eventually shaped his career, making him one of the most popular comedians in Pashto drama.

Ismail Shahid began his professional acting career in the 1980s when Pashto dramas were gaining attraction in Pakistan. His early performances were in stage dramas, where he showcased his natural talent for comic timing and character portrayal. With the advent of Pashto television dramas, Shahid quickly transitioned to television, where he became a household name. Shahid worked in more than 800 Pashto dramas at PTV Peshawar Center. One of Ismail Shahid's most significant contributions is his work in promoting Pashto language and culture through drama. At a time when Pashto dramas were overshadowed by Urdu plays, Shahid played a key role in revitalizing Pashto theater and television. He has also written and directed several stage plays and television dramas, showcasing his versatile talents as a playwright.

Shahid's comedy often highlights social issues, addressing topics like family dynamics, politics, and cultural traditions in a humorous yet thought-provoking manner. His ability to make people laugh while reflecting on the complexities of everyday life has earned him a loyal fanbase.

In July 2016, he released two tele-films for Eid, Buda Kaka and Roond, Kunr ao Chaara.

In December 2017, Shahid was one of 75 performers and sportspeople to be awarded at the Pride of Peshawar.

== Awards ==
Year	Award	Category	Result	Ref.
1993	Pride of Performance Award	Arts	Won	

== See also ==
- Syed Rahman Shino
- Mirawas
