= Michelle Meldrum =

American guitarist (1968–2008)

- Born: Michelle Foisy Hubbard; September 28, 1968; Detroit, Michigan, U.S.
- Died: May 21, 2008 (aged 39) Burbank, California, U.S.
- Genres: Hard rock, heavy metal
- Occupation: Guitarist
- Years active: 1987–2008
- Formerly of: Phantom Blue, Meldrum

Michelle Meldrum (September 28, 1968 – May 21, 2008) was an American hard rock guitarist known for being a member of the bands Phantom Blue and Meldrum.

== Life and career ==
Meldrum was born in Detroit, Michigan, to a family of musicians and actors (grandfather Thomas Hubbard and Great Uncle Elbert Hubbard). The family moved to Los Angeles, California when she was 13. She started playing guitar at age 14. Uli Jon Roth and Michael Schenker were her main influences after listening to albums such as the Scorpions' 1976 album Virgin Killer. Her first move was forming thrash metal band Wargod with later Dark Angel, Death and Strapping Young Lad drummer Gene Hoglan, then moving on to become both co-founder and lead guitarist in Phantom Blue, an all-female heavy metal band. Phantom Blue released their self-titled debut album on Shrapnel Records in the US (Roadrunner Records in Europe and Japan, and on to a major label deal with Geffen Records). The band toured internationally with much success.

Meldrum married Europe guitarist John Norum in 1995 and they moved to Sweden, where she went on to form Meldrum, a multi-national hard rock band. In 2005, Meldrum toured for three months with Zakk Wylde's Black Label Society, appearing in sold out venues across the US and Europe. In the fall of 2005, Meldrum joined Motörhead as special guests on their 30th anniversary tour throughout Europe. Meldrum has also toured with Sepultura, Danzig and Nashville Pussy, among others. In addition, she performed with her former Phantom Blue bandmate Linda McDonald and The Iron Maidens on a handful of gigs in late 2006.

== Death ==
Michelle fell into a coma on May 18, 2008, and died three days later on May 21 due to complications of a cystic growth on her brain that had restricted the oxygen and blood flow, rendering her brain-dead. She was 39 years old. She is survived by her parents, her husband John Norum and their son, Jake Thomas. Meldrum had just completed writing and recording a new album at the time, which the surviving band members released in 2009 in tribute to her. The band, along with the surviving members of Phantom Blue, participated in a benefit concert at Whisky a Go Go in Hollywood, California, on May 26, 2009, in memory of Michelle.

== Discography ==
=== Wargod ===
- Wargod (1985) demo
- Wargod (1986) demo
- Speed Metal Hell II (1986) compilation
- Thrash Metal Attack (1987) compilation
- Metal Massacre 8 (1987) compilation

=== Post Mortem ===
- The Missing Link (1987) EP

=== Phantom Blue ===
- "Why Call It Love?" (1989) single
- Phantom Blue (1989)
- "My Misery" (1993) single
- Built to Perform (1993)
- Prime Cuts & Glazed Donuts (1995)

=== Meldrum ===
- Loaded Mental Cannon (2002)
- Blowin' Up the Machine (2007)
- Lifer (2009)
