= Muhammad Rehman =

Pakistani cardiac surgeon

- Born: 5 January 1944 (age 82); Peshawar, Pakistan
- Education: Khyber Medical College; Royal College of Surgeons of Edinburgh
- Occupation: Cardiothoracic surgeon

Muhammad Rehman (Urdu: پروفيسرڈ اکٹرمحمّدرحمٰن; born 5 January 1944) is a Pakistani cardiac surgeon. Rehman hails from the village Budhni in Peshawar. He is the founder of Rehman Medical Institute (RMI), Rehman Medical College and Rehman Medical Center.

Rehman obtained his MBBS degree from the Khyber Medical College. He completed his training in Cardiothoracic surgery in 1975 from Royal College of Surgeons Edinburgh. He is the leading Cardiothoracic surgeon in Pakistan. His experience in the field of Cardiac Surgery started in July 1974 as Registrar in Cardiothoracic Surgery in The London Chest Hospital. In January 1975 he moved on to work as Registrar in Brompton Hospital, London. He then decided to move back to Pakistan and started working in the National Institute of Cardiovascular Diseases, Karachi as Consultant Cardiac Surgeon in August 1975. He remained the Head of the Cardiac Surgical Department and served his department for 28 years, retiring as Professor of Cardiac Surgery in January 2004.

While working there, Professor Rehman remained the Dean Faculty of Cardiac Surgery in the College of Physicians and Surgeons Pakistan and also served as the President of the Pakistan Society of Cardiovascular and Thoracic Surgeons. He was the patron of the "Friends of Cardiac Surgery", a non-profit organization supporting the Cardiac Unit at the Civil Hospital, Karachi. He is also the founder editor of the Journal of Cardiovascular and Thoracic Surgeons.

== See also ==
- Rehman Medical College
