= Galadari Brothers =

Emirati conglomerate company

Galadari Brothers Co. L.L.C.
- Industry: Group of Companies
- Founded: 1960; 66 years ago
- Headquarters: Dubai, United Arab Emirates
- Area served: United Arab Emirates
- Subsidiaries: Galadari Hotel
- Website: galadarigroup.com

Galadari Brothers Co. L.L.C. are a conglomerate company based in the United Arab Emirates, established in 1960 and headquartered in Dubai, United Arab Emirates.

== History ==
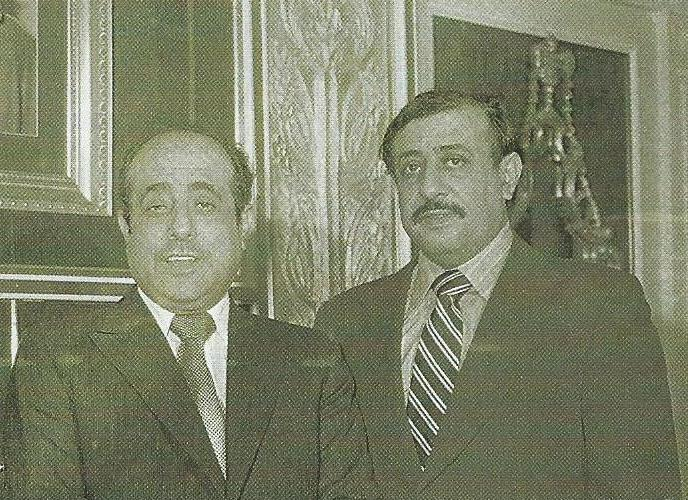
Abdul Rahim Galadari (right) with brother Abdul Latif Galadari

In 1976, the brothers split, with Abdul Rahim and Abdul Latif retaining the business by buying out Abdul Wahab.

In 2006, the government of Dubai took a 30 percent stake in the conglomerate. It was reported the 30 percent stake replaced Galadari's debt to the government and other companies. A court-appointed by Mohammed bin Rashid Al Maktoum, the Vice President and Prime Minister of the United Arab Emirates, first restructured the group and then replaced the board with a three-member temporary board.

== Businesses ==
Galadari Brothers have investments in print and online media in the Middle East. Other companies under the Galadari Group in the UAE include Mazda UAE, Baskin-Robbins Ice Cream, Galadari Hotel in Colombo, Galadari Construction, Galadari Heavy Equipment Division, and Galadari Saudi Industrial Co. in Saudi Arabia, The group also has stakes in Galadari Cement in Karachi, Pakistan.

=== Galadari Heavy Equipment Division ===
The brothers started focusing on the heavy equipment sector and looking for the best heavy equipment machinery to bring to the UAE, Starting with Komatsu they launched Galadari Trucks & Heavy Equipment, and by that time, the brands increased to more than 30 brands that covered Construction equipment, mining equipment, road machinery, cranes, trucks, material handlers, aerial lifts, energy products & solutions.

This tremendous expansion required the separation of product categories into independent companies, and now the division consists of six companies, each responsible for several product categories and geographical areas: Kaldari Trucks and Heavy Equipment, GB Equipment Solutions, Kaldari Energy Solutions, Kaldari International Technical Services, Kaldari Tyres, and Kaldari Saudi Industries.
