= List of female heavy metal singers =

This is a list of female metal artists with articles on Wikipedia. For female singers of other rock genres, see List of female rock singers.

== A ==
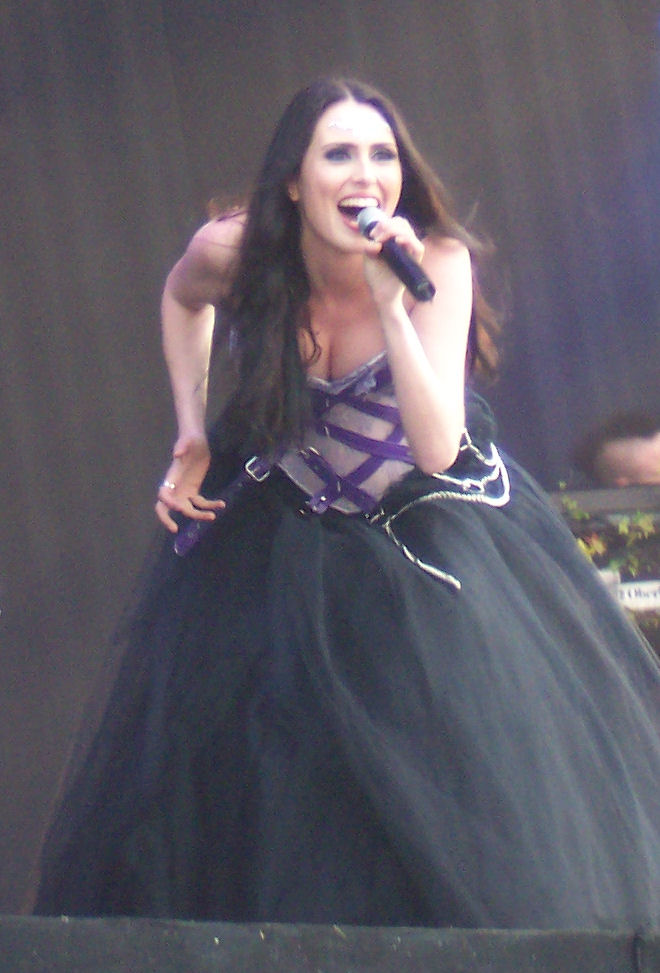
Sharon den Adel

- Lee Aaron
- Sharon den Adel (Within Temptation, Ayreon)
- Anza (Head Phones President)
- Maria Arkhipova "Masha Scream" (Arkona)
- Emily Armstrong (Dead Sara, Linkin Park)
- Anita Auglend (The Sins of Thy Beloved)

== B ==
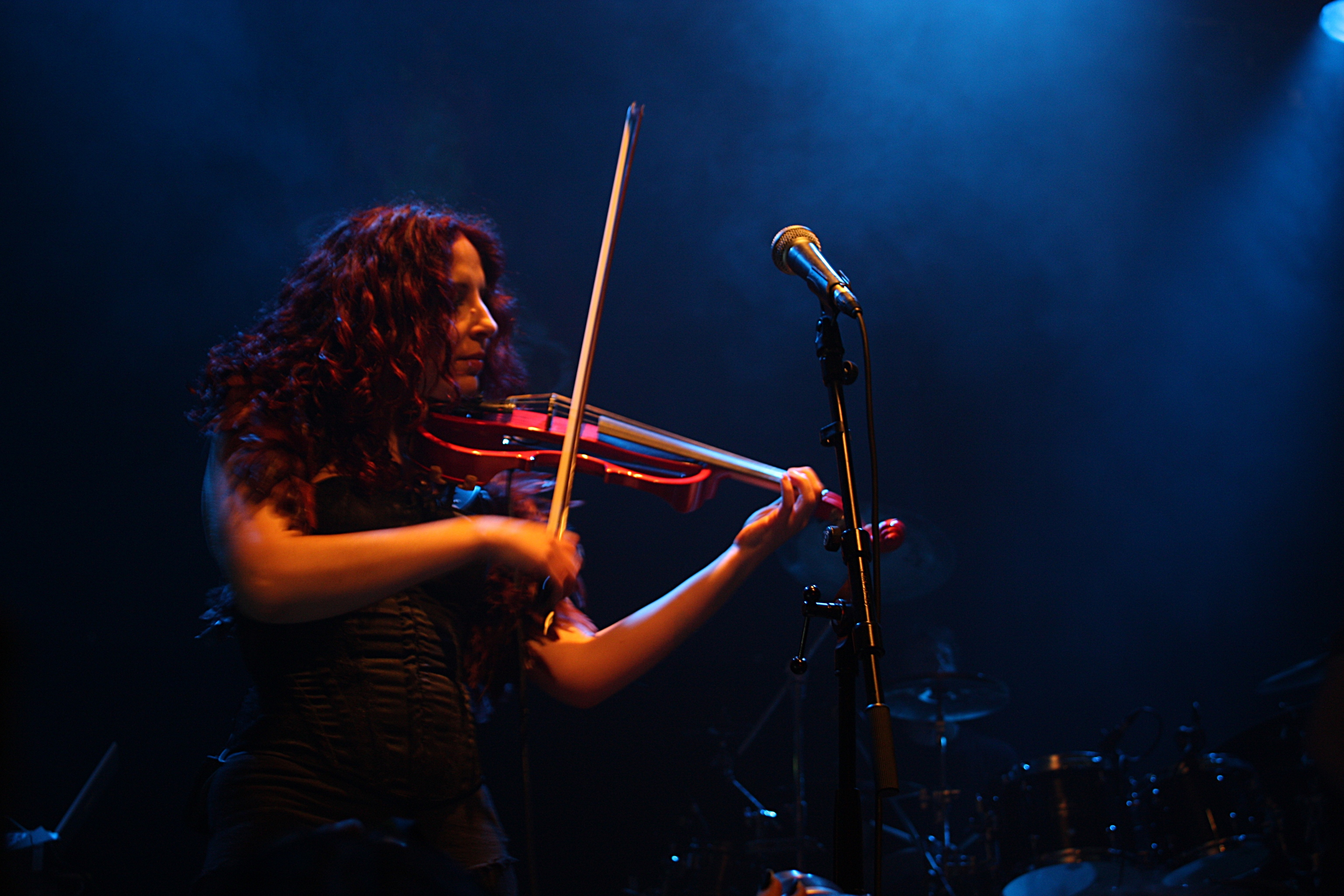
Marcela Bovio

- Tairrie B (My Ruin, Tura Satana)
- Sevi Bliznakova (SEVI)
- Ann Boleyn (Hellion)
- Steffanie Borges (Steffanie, Show-Ya)
- Marcela Bovio (Stream of Passion, MaYaN, Ayreon, Elfonia)
- Fallon Bowman (Kittie)
- Maria Brink (In This Moment)
- Amalie Bruun (Myrkur)

== C ==
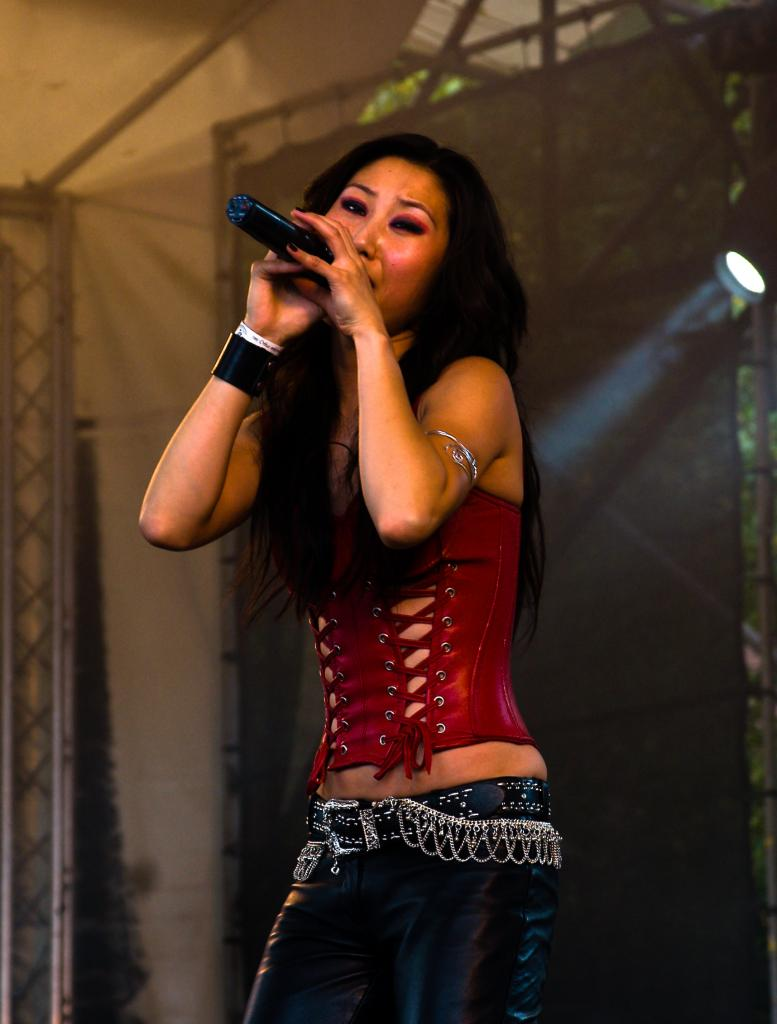
Ji-In Cho

- Cadaveria (Opera IX, Cadaveria)
- Cassiopée (Anemonia)
- Francesca Chiara (The LoveCrave)
- Ji-In Cho (Krypteria)
- Lucia Cifarelli (KMFDM, Drill)
- Sabina Classen (Holy Moses)
- Dorthia Cottrell (Windhand)
- Dawn Crosby (Detente, Fear of God)
- Cherie Currie (The Runaways)
- Julie Christmas (Made Out of Babies, Battle of Mice, Spylacopa)

== D ==
- Clémentine Delauney (Visions of Atlantis, Serenity, Whyzdom, Exit Eden)
- Sarah Jezebel Deva (Angtoria, Cradle of Filth, Therion, The Kovenant)
- Sabine Dünser (Erben der Schöpfung, Elis)

== E ==
- Aimee Echo (Human Waste Project, TheStart)
- Ann-Mari Edvardsen (The Third and the Mortal, Tactile Gemma)
- Eilera (Chrysalis)
- Liv Kristine Espenæs (Theatre of Tragedy, Leaves' Eyes, The Sirens)

== F ==
- Şebnem Ferah (Volvox)
- Melissa Ferlaak (Aesma Daeva, Visions of Atlantis, Echoterra)
- Jennifer Finch (L7)
- Lita Ford (The Runaways, Lita Ford band)
- Veronica Freeman (Benedictum)

== G ==
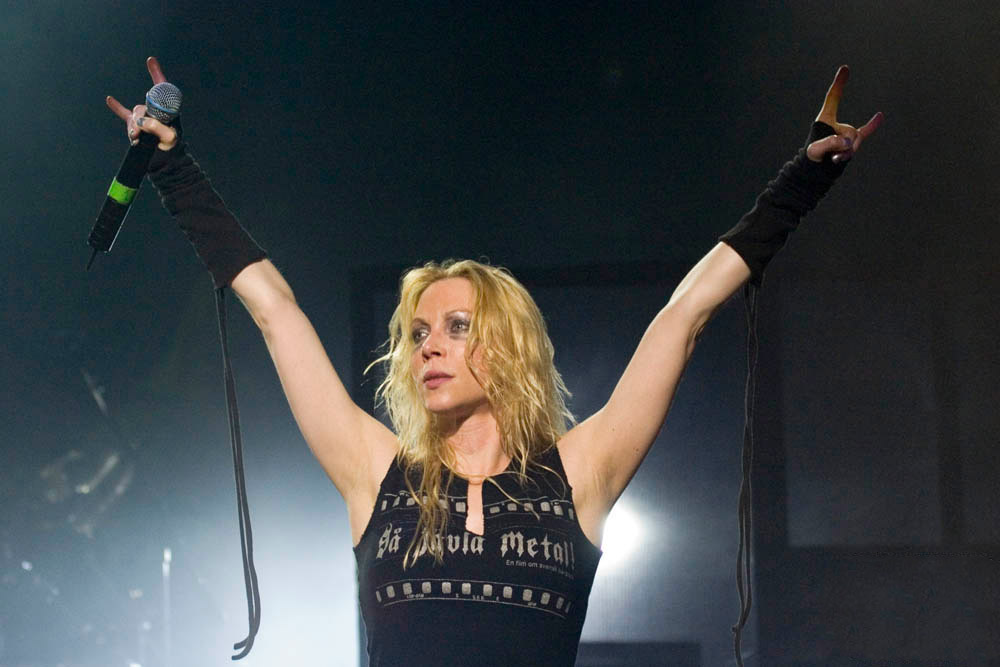
Angela Gossow

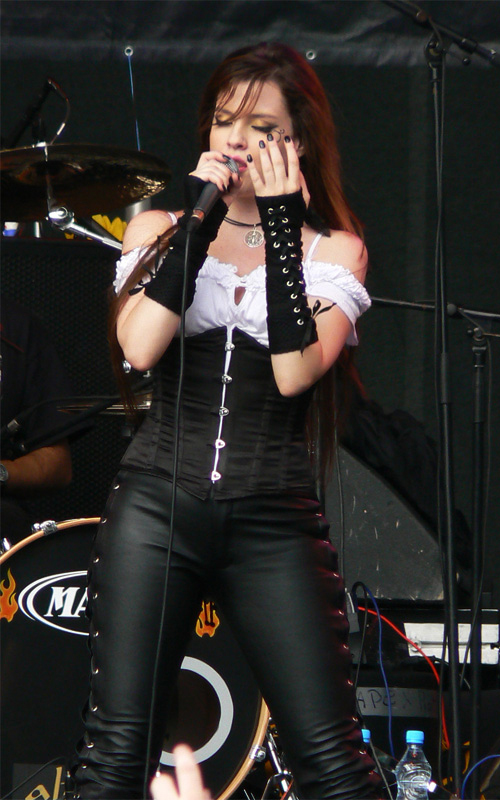
Pilar "Ailyn" Giménez

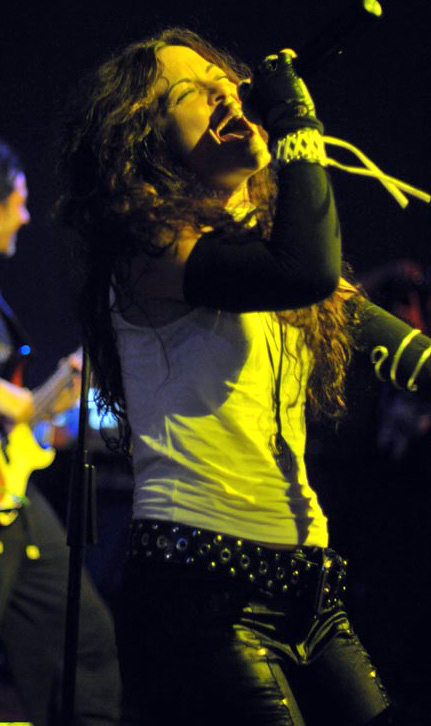
Giorgia Gueglio

- Marta Gabriel (Crystal Viper)
- Runhild Gammelsæter (Thorr's Hammer, Khlyst)
- Janet Gardner (Vixen)
- Suzi Gardner (L7)
- Pilar Giménez "Ailyn" (Sirenia)
- Kimberly Goss (Sinergy, Ancient, Therion)
- Angela Gossow (Arch Enemy)
- Jacqueline Govaert (Ayreon)
- Giorgia Gueglio (Mastercastle)

== H ==
- Lzzy Hale (Halestorm)
- Mari Hamada
- Lauren Harris (Six Hour Sundown, Lauren Harris)
- Carla Harvey (Butcher Babies)
- Laurie Ann Haus (Rain Fell Within, Autumn Tears)
- Hannah Holgersson (Therion)
- Slymenstra Hymen (Gwar)

== I ==
- Ihriel (Peccatum)

== J ==
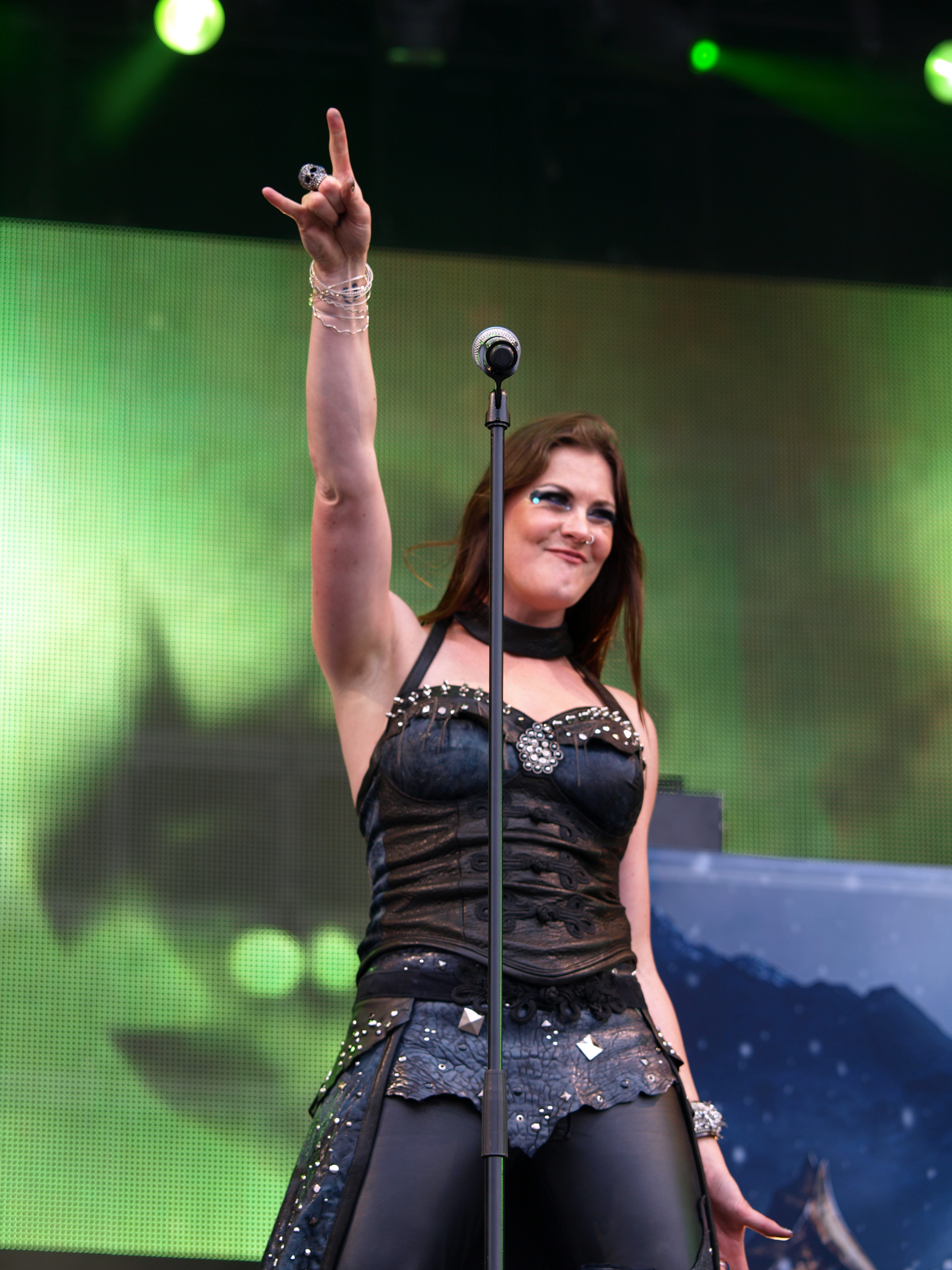
Floor Jansen

- Floor Jansen (ReVamp, After Forever, Ayreon, Nightwish)
- Irene Jansen (Ayreon, Star One)
- Jill Janus (Huntress, The Starbreakers, Chelsea Girls)
- Kelly Johnson (Girlschool)

== K ==
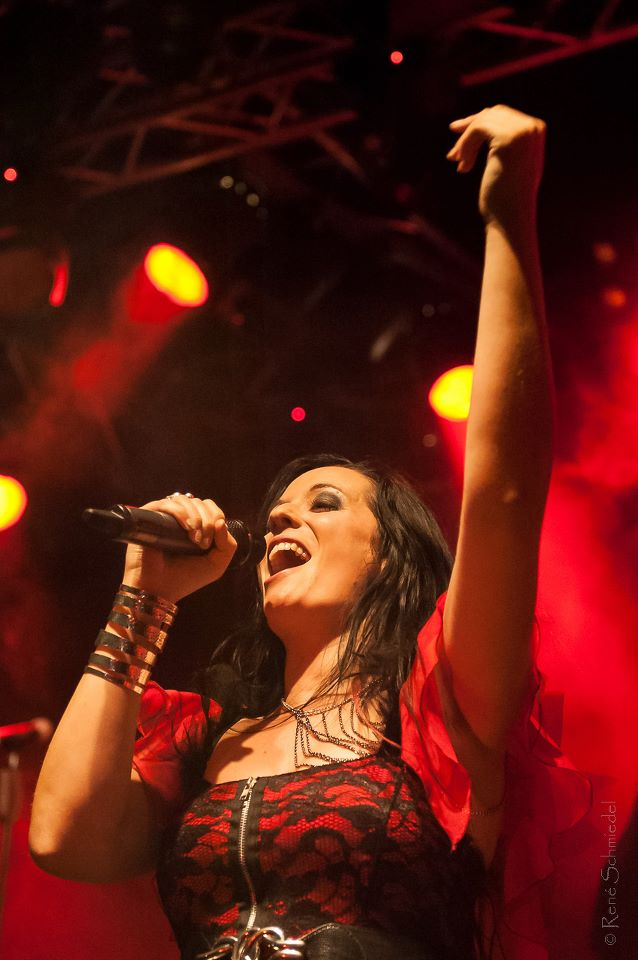
Manuela Kraller

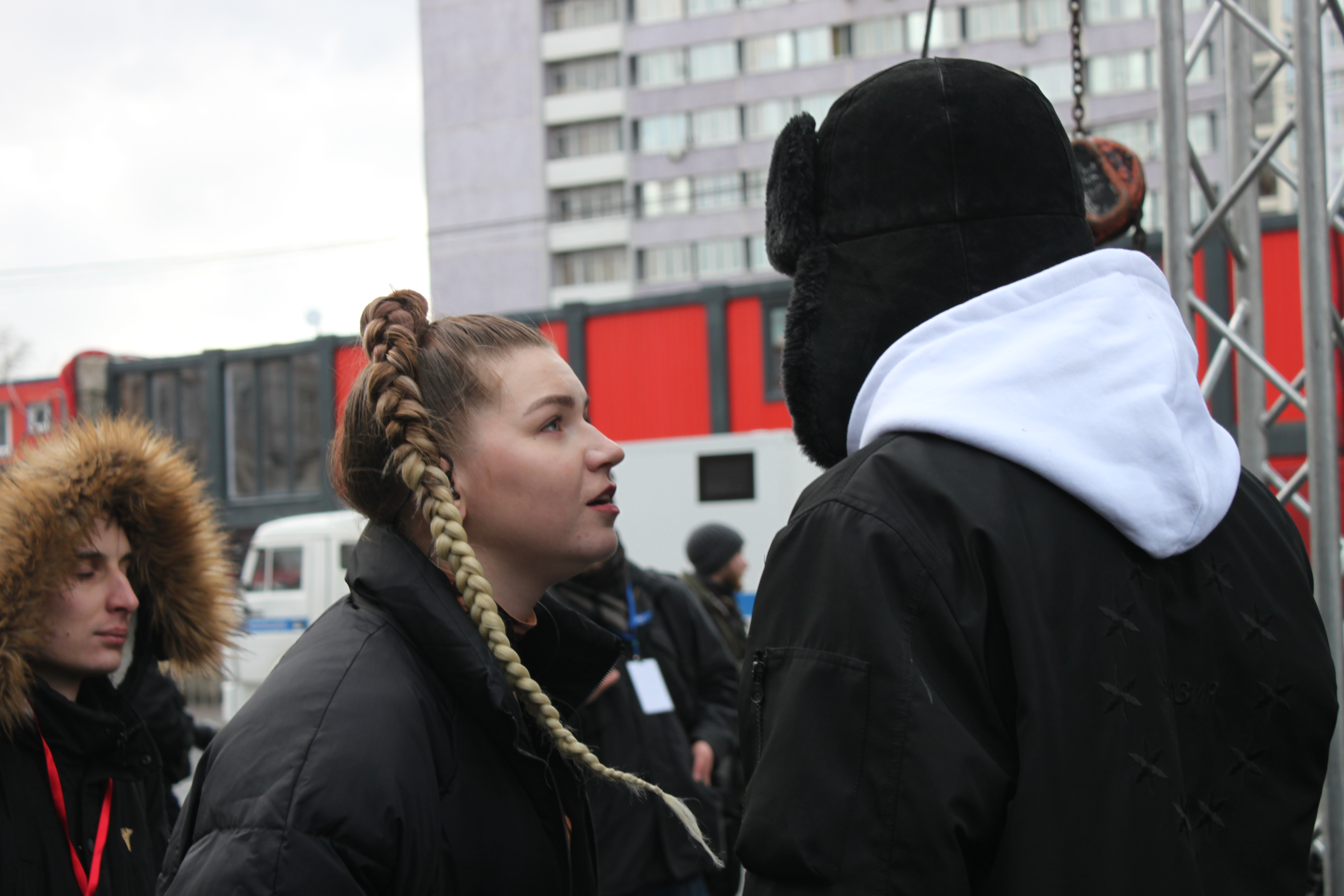
Anastasia Kreslina

- Chez Kane
- Vena Kava (Killing Moon)
- Moa Kikuchi (Babymetal)
- Aja Kim (The Iron Maidens)
- Maria Kolokouri (Astarte)
- Gaby Koss (Haggard, Nota Profana)
- Manuela Kraller (Haggard, Xandria, Nagor Mar)
- Anna Katharina Kränzlein (Schandmaul)
- Eileen Küpper (Therion, The Kovenant)

== L ==
- Lana Lane (Lana Lane, Ayreon)
- Courtney LaPlante (Spiritbox)
- Leah (solo, Dragonlord)
- Jen Ledger (Skillet)
- Amy Lee (Evanescence)
- Leather Leone (Chastain)
- Sara Löfgren (TWDSO)
- Magali Luyten (Virus IV, Beautiful Sin, Ayreon)

== M ==
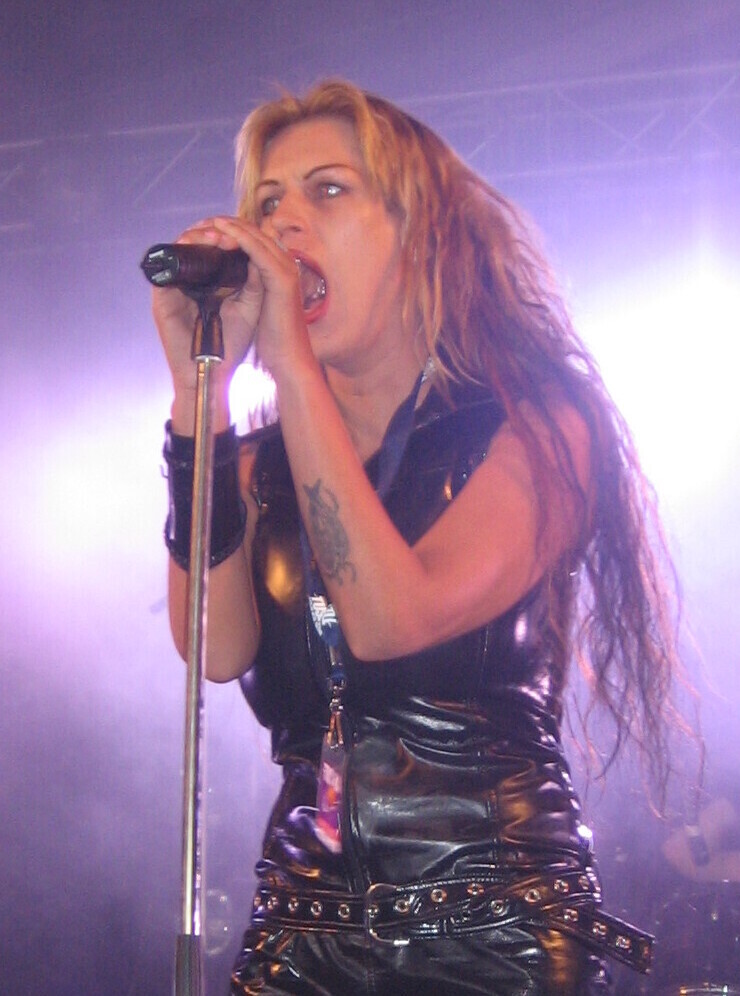
Helena Iren Michaelsen

- Mākii (High and Mighty Color)
- Elisa Martin (Dark Moor, Fairyland, Dreamaker)
- Michie Mee (Raggadeath)
- Helena Iren Michaelsen (Trail of Tears, Imperia, Angel)
- Lisa Middelhauve (Xandria, Whyzdom)
- Mie (Animetal Lady)
- Yui Mizuno (Babymetal)
- Taylor Momsen (The Pretty Reckless)
- Anna Murphy (Eluveitie, Cellar Darling)

== N ==
- Suzuka Nakamoto (Babymetal)
- Sandra Nasić (Guano Apes)
- Maxi Nil (Visions of Atlantis, Elysion, On Thorns I Lay, Jaded Star)
- Anne Nurmi (Lacrimosa)

== O ==
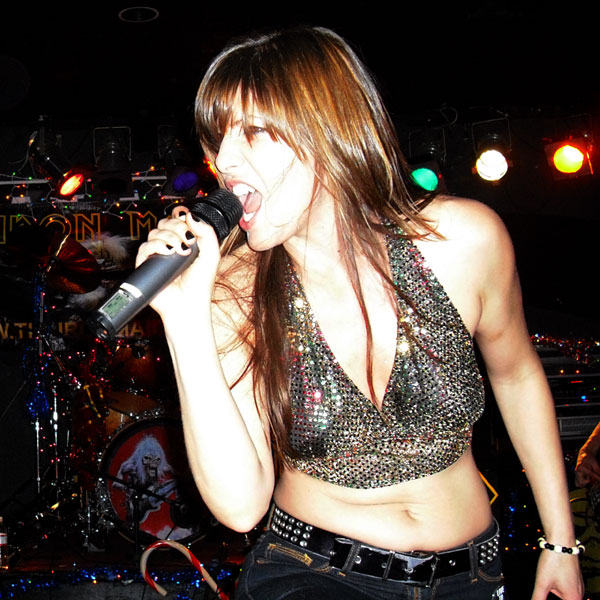
Deb Obarski

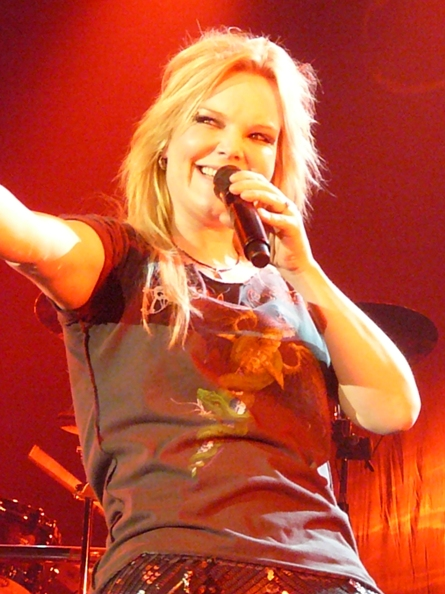
Anette Olzon

- Deb Obarski (The Iron Maidens)
- Kazuha Oda (Kazha)
- Momoko Okazaki (Babymetal)
- Anette Olzon (Nightwish, Alyson Avenue, The Dark Element)
- Manda Ophuis (Nemesea)
- Orianthi

== P ==
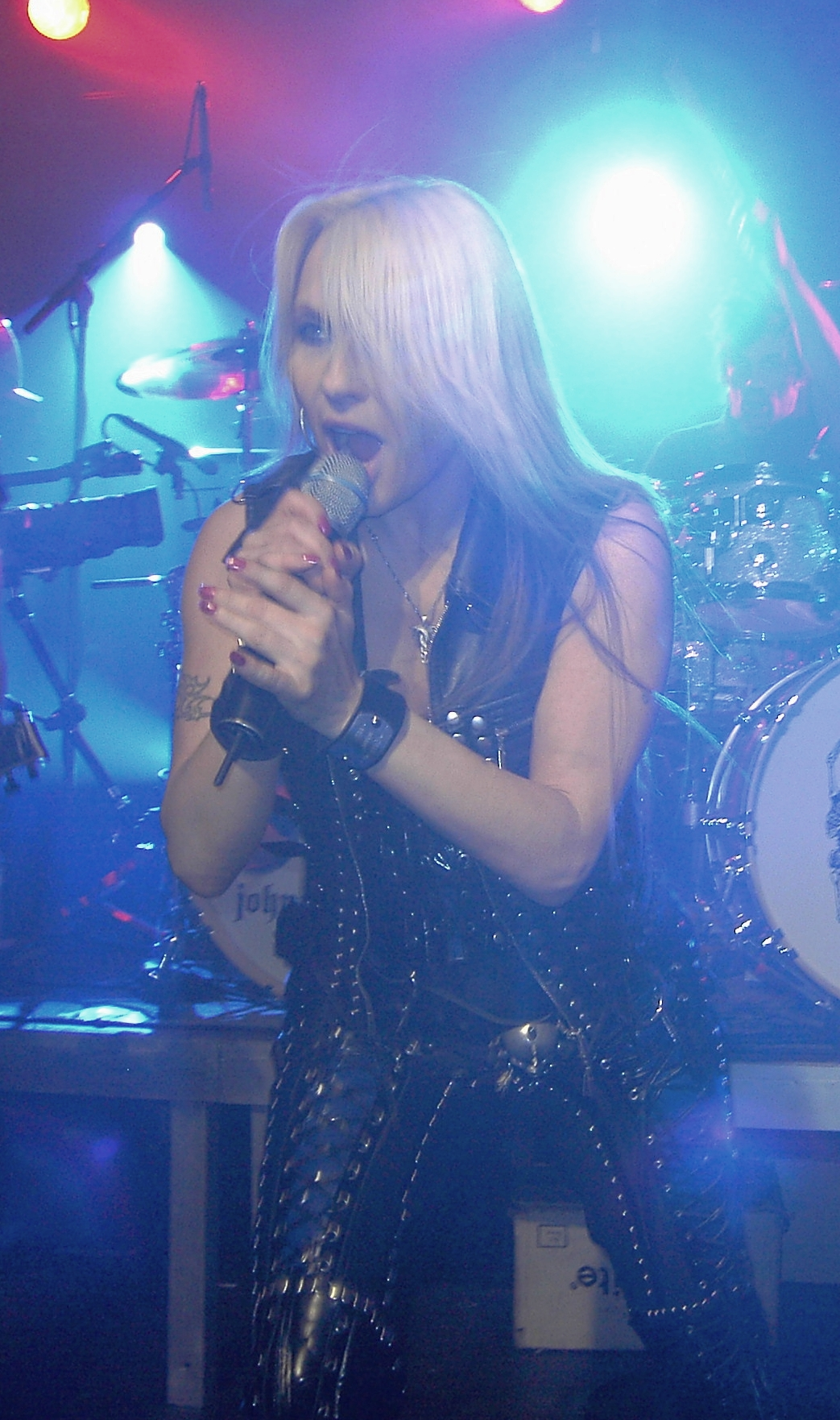
Doro Pesch

- Heidi Parviainen (Amberian Dawn, Dark Sarah)
- Monika Pedersen (Sirenia, Sinphonia)
- Doro Pesch (Warlock, Doro)
- Poppy
- Vicky Psarakis (The Agonist)

== R ==
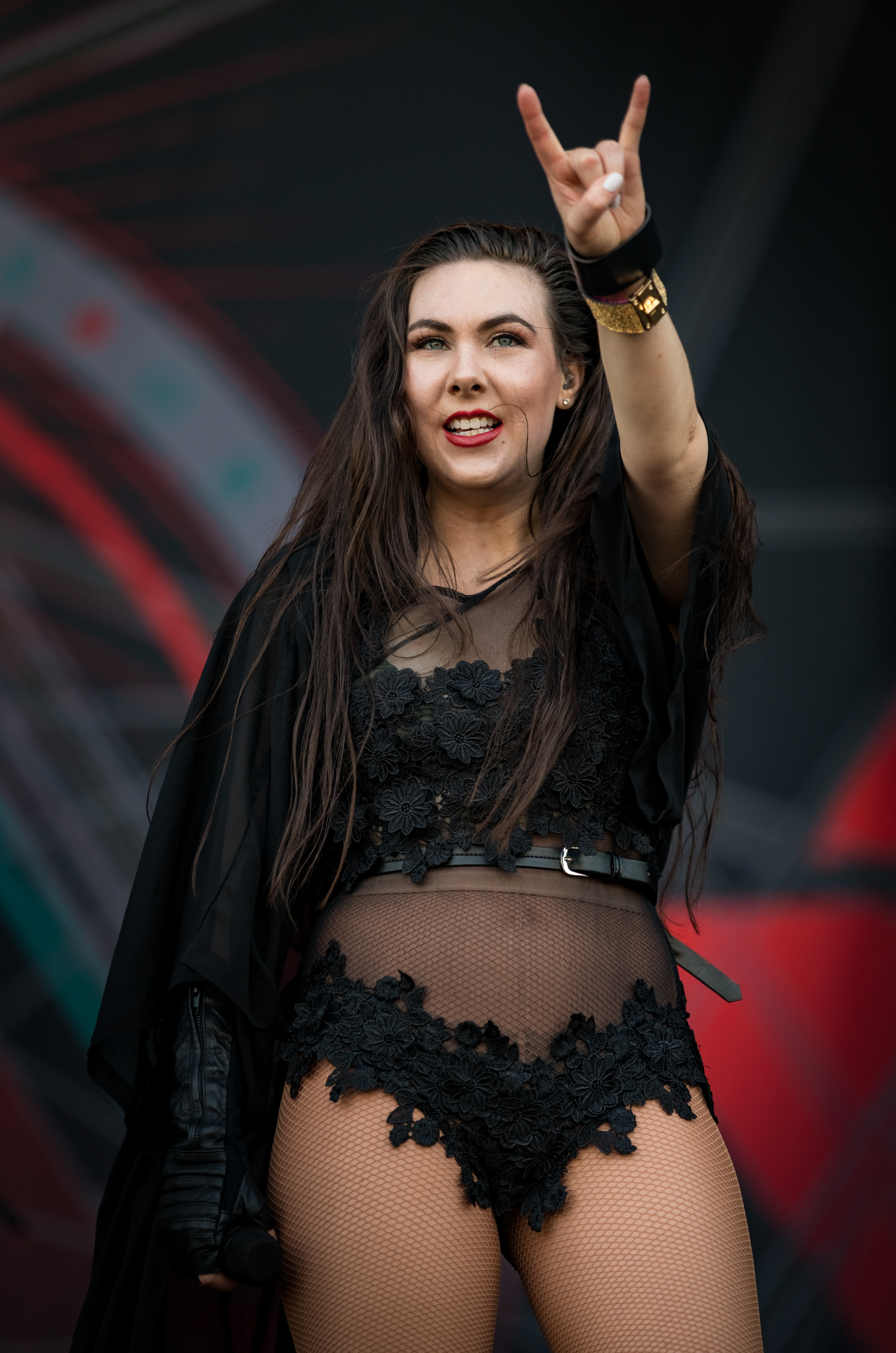
Elize Ryd

- Rami (Aldious)
- Kirsten Rosenberg (The Iron Maidens)
- Nene Royal
- Kari Rueslåtten (The 3rd and the Mortal, Storm, The Sirens)
- Patti Russo (Trans-Siberian Orchestra)
- Elize Ryd (Amaranthe, Kamelot)
- Angelica Rylin (The Murder of My Sweet)

== S ==
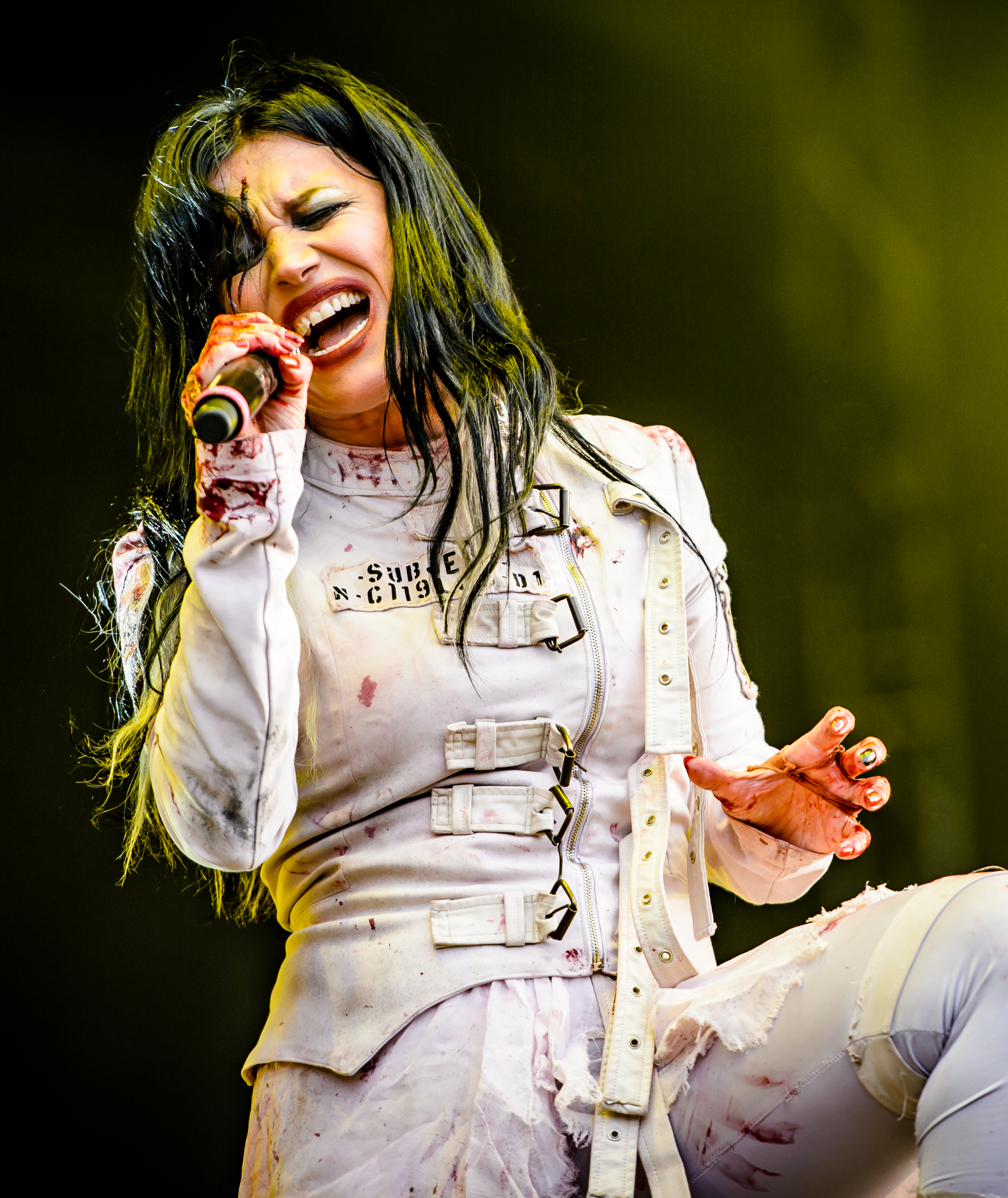
Cristina Scabbia

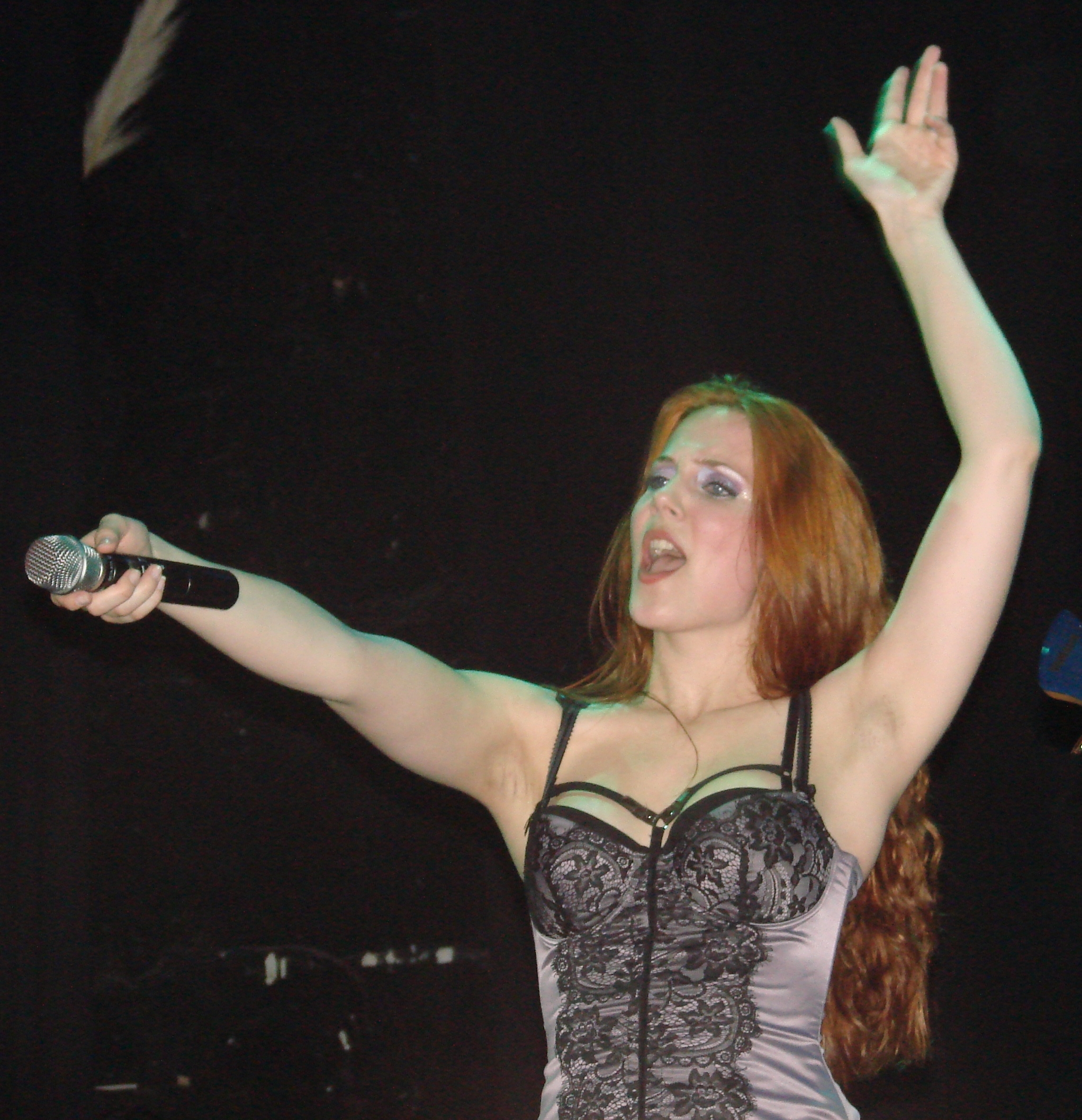
Simone Simons

- Cristina Scabbia (Lacuna Coil)
- Elizabeth Schall (Dreaming Dead)
- Lena Scissorhands (Infected Rain)
- Sandra Schleret (Dreams of Sanity, Siegfried, Elis)
- Otep Shamaya (Otep)
- Nell Sigland (The Crest, Theatre of Tragedy)
- Elina Siirala (Leaves' Eyes, Angel Nation)
- Simone Simons (Epica, Aina, Kamelot, Ayreon)
- Skin (Skunk Anansie)
- Jada Pinkett Smith (Wicked Wisdom)
- Carly Smithson (We Are the Fallen)
- Amanda Somerville (Aina, HDK, Trillium, Avantasia, Docker's Guild, Kiske/Somerville, Epica, Exit Eden)
- Sara Squadrani (Ancient Bards)
- Vibeke Stene (Tristania, God Of Atheists)
- Lacey Sturm (Flyleaf)
- Sever (Sumo Cyco)
- Sylvaine

== T ==
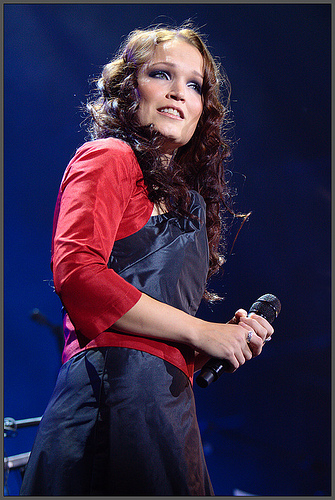
Tarja Turunen

- Keiko Terada (Show-Ya)
- Katherine "The Great Kat" Thomas (The Great Kat)
- Tarja Turunen (Nightwish, Tarja)

== V ==
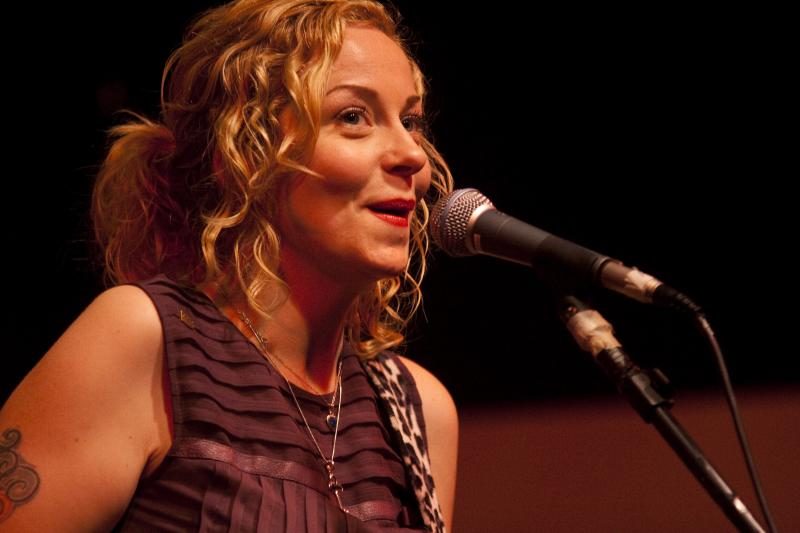
Anneke van Giersbergen

- Anneke van Giersbergen (The Gathering, Agua De Annique, VUUR, Ayreon, The Sirens, The Devin Townsend Project, The Gentle Storm)
- Dianne van Giersbergen (Xandria, Ex Libris)
- Päivi "Capri" Virkkunen (Amberian Dawn)

== W ==
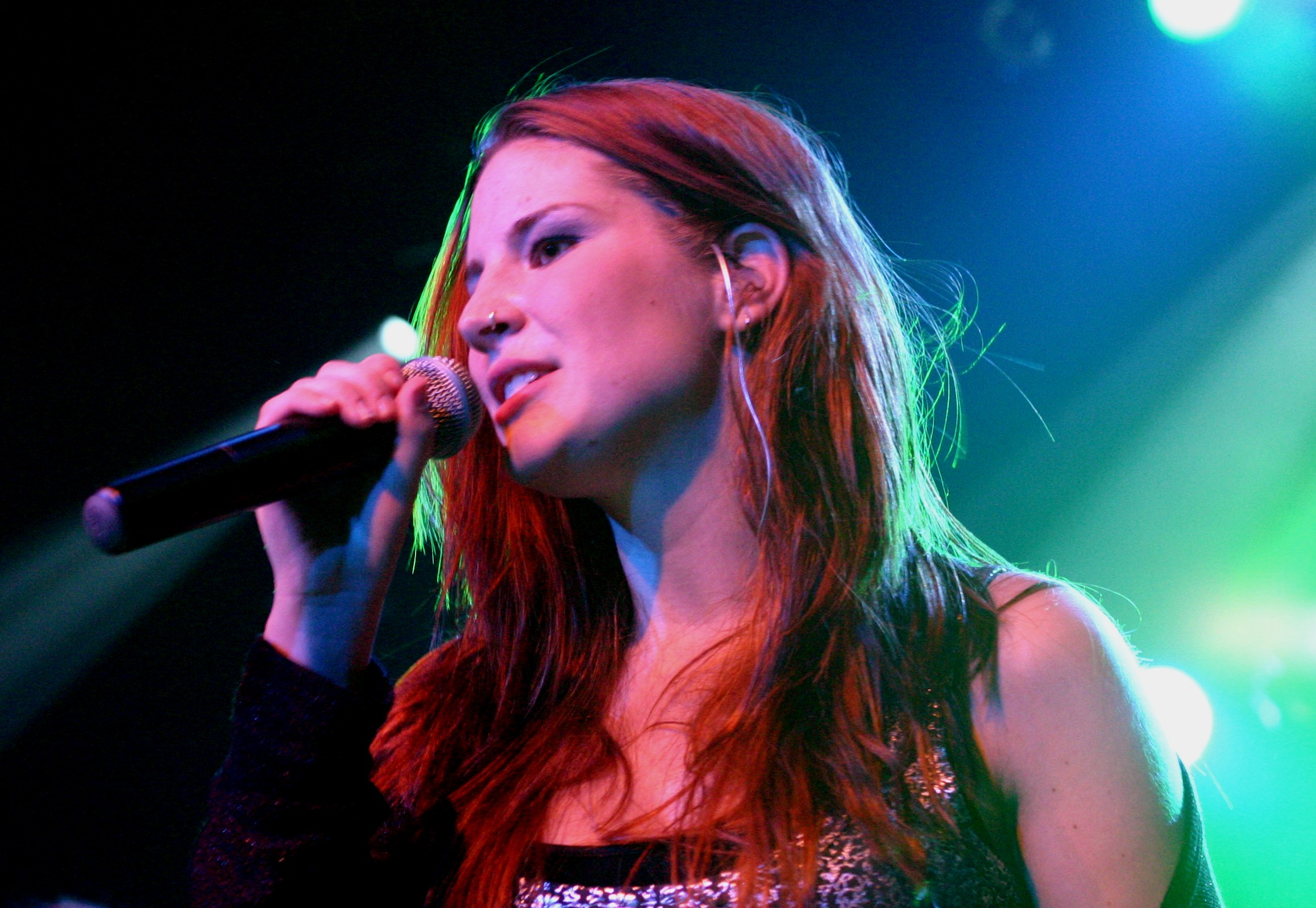
Charlotte Wessels

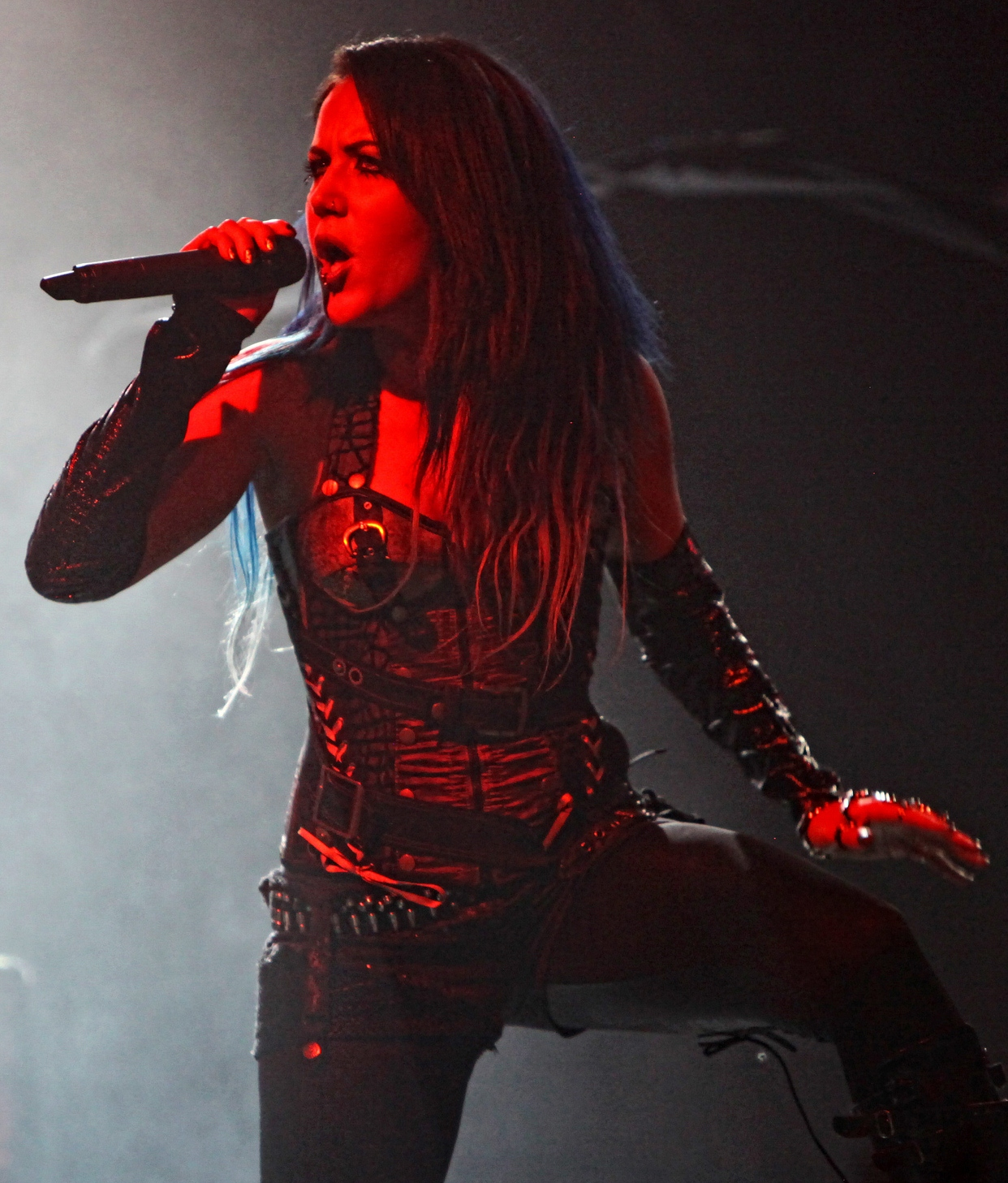
Alissa White-Gluz

- Jenny Warren (The Iron Maidens)
- Quinn Weng (Seraphim)
- Silje Wergeland (Octavia Sperati, The Gathering)
- Charlotte Wessels (Delain)
- Alissa White-Gluz (The Agonist, Arch Enemy)
- Wendy O. Williams (The Plasmatics)

== Z ==
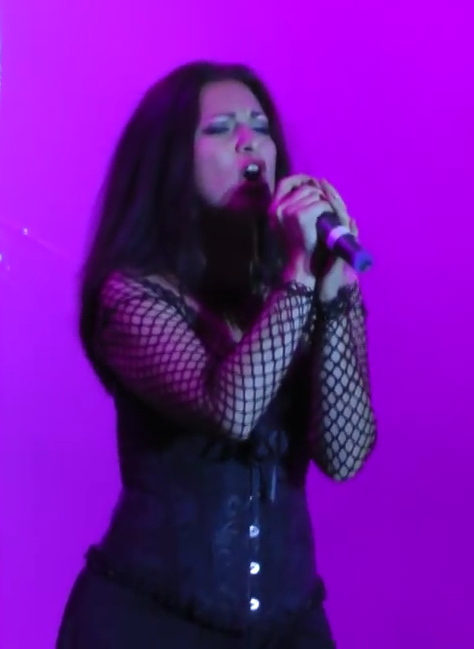
Emmanuelle Zoldan

- Emmanuelle Zoldan (Sirenia)

== See also ==
- List of female rock singers
