= Cataraga =

Cataraga is a surname. Notable people with the surname include:

- Elena Cataraga, better known as Lena Scissorhands (born 1986), Moldovan singer and songwriter
- Tudor Cataraga (1956–2020), Moldovan sculptor
