= Beethoven on Speed =

Studio album by The Great Kat
- Released: September 18, 1990
- Genre: Neoclassical metal
- Length: 29:46
- Label: Roadracer/Intercord Record Service
- Producers: The Great Kat, Jon Mathias, Monte Conner

The Great Kat chronology
Worship Me or Die! (1987)	Beethoven on Speed (1990)	Digital Beethoven on Cyberspeed (1996)

Professional ratings
Review scores
Source	Rating
AllMusic	3/5 stars
Encyclopedia of Popular Music	4/5 stars
Hit Parader	2/5 stars
Kerrang!	"G"
Metal Forces	20/100
Metal Hammer	1/5
NME	−10/10
Rock Hard	5/10
Select	1/5 medals

Beethoven on Speed is the second studio album by The Great Kat, released in 1990.

== Track listing ==
The album is divided into two opuses :

Opus One

1. "Beethoven on Speed (Beethoven's 5th Symphony in C Minor)" — 1:54
2. "Ultra-Dead" — 3:19
3. "Flight of the Bumble-Bee" — 2:08
4. "Revenge Mongrel" — 1:33
5. "Funeral March (Piano Sonata in B Minor, Arranged for guitar)" — 3:07
6. "Kat-Abuse" — 1:54
7. "God!" — 1:17
8. "Made in Japan" — 1:48
9. "Sex & Violins" — 1:28

Opus Two

1. "Beethoven Mosh (Beethoven's 5th Symphony in C Minor)" — 2:08
2. "Gripping Obsession" — 2:21
3. "Paganini's 24th Caprice (Violin Caprice in a Minor, Arranged for Guitar)" — 1:52
4. "Worshipping Bodies" — 2:30
5. "Guitar Concerto in Blood Minor" — 2:41
6. "Total Tyrant" — 2:00
7. "Bach to the Future: For Geniuses ONLY!" — 0:25
