= Worship Me or Die! =

Studio album by The Great Kat
- Released: 1987
- Genre: Heavy metal, speed metal
- Length: 30:17
- Label: Roadracer
- Producer: Kurt Shore & The Great Kat

The Great Kat chronology
Worship Me or Die! (1987)	Beethoven on Speed (1990)

Professional ratings
Review scores
Source	Rating
AllMusic	2/5 stars
Metal Forces	7.7/10

Worship Me or Die! (1987) is the debut studio album by heavy metal guitarist The Great Kat.

== Track listing ==
All songs by The Great Kat

1. "Metal Messiah" — 2:58
2. "Kat Possessed" — 2:44
3. "Death to You" — 2:13
4. "Satan Goes to Church" — 3:05
5. "Worship Me or Die" — 2:02
6. "Demons" — 2:46
7. "Speed Death" — 2:38
8. "Kill the Mothers" — 2:43
9. "Ashes to Dust" — 4:08
10. "Satan Says" — 2:57
11. "Metal Massacre" — 1:57

== Personnel ==
=== Band members ===
- The Great Kat - guitars, vocals, violin
- Tom Von Doom - bass
- Adam Killa - drums
