= Infected Rain =

Moldovan metal band

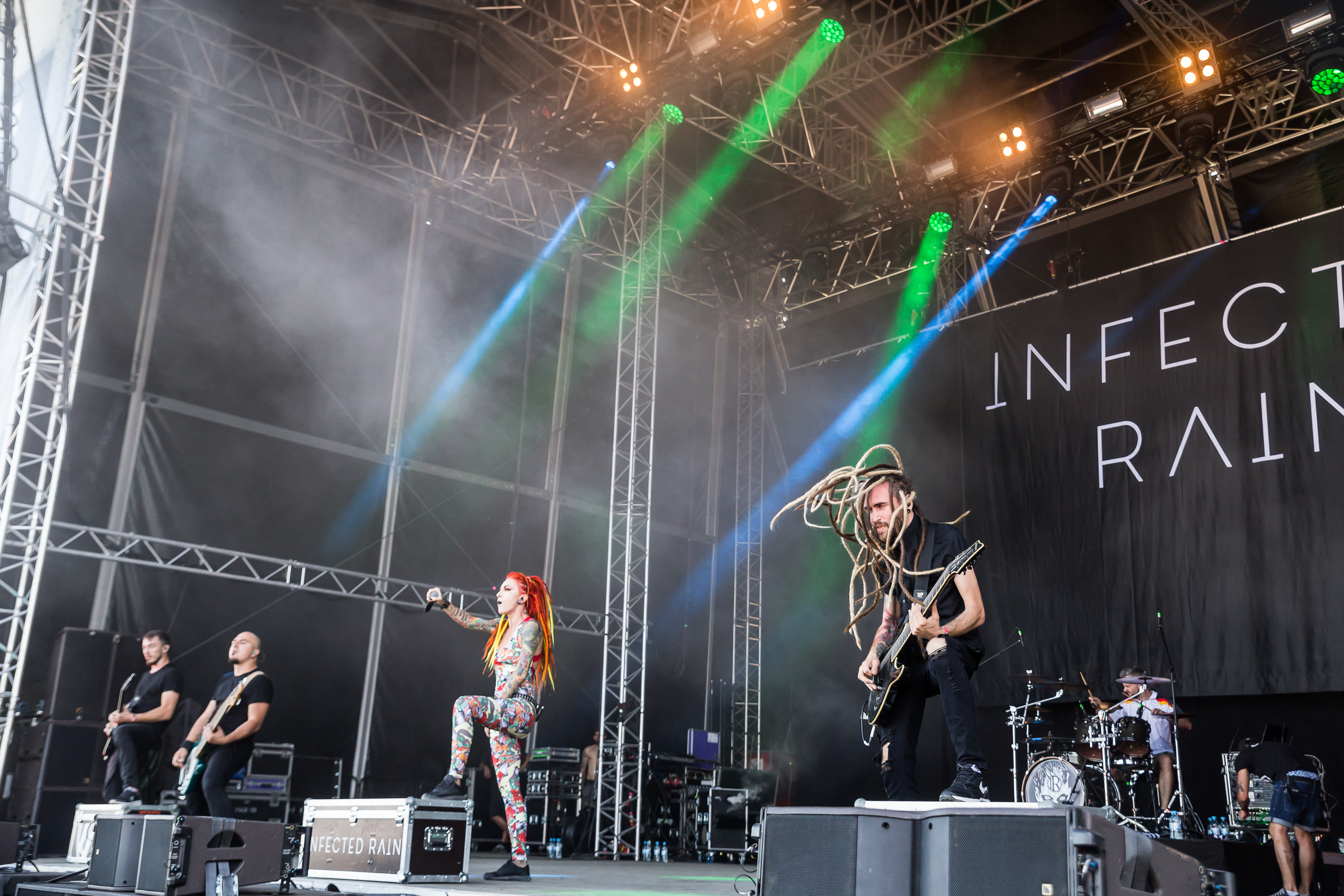
- Infected Rain at Full Force 2019 in Germany

Background information
- Origin: Chișinău, Moldova
- Genres: Nu metal; metalcore; groove metal; nu metalcore
- Years active: 2008–present
- Label: Napalm
- Members: Elena "Lena Scissorhands" Cataraga; Vadim "Vidick" Ojog; Eugen Voluta; Alice Lane
- Past members: Andrei "Mednyi"; Ivan Kristioglo (DJ Kapa); Vadim Protsenko; Vladimir Babich; Sergey Babich
- Website: infectedrain.com

Infected Rain is a Moldovan heavy metal band formed in 2008 in Chișinău. They are signed to Napalm Records.

== History ==
The group was formed in 2008 by guitarist Vadim "Vidick" Ojog, lead vocalist Elena Cataraga a.k.a. Lena Scissorhands, and disc jockey Ivan Kristioglo a.k.a. DJ Kapa. They debuted in August 2008 at a concert dedicated to Slayer. Later that month, Infected Rain took part at the Red Alert heavy metal festival in Crimea and recorded their first demo CD composed of three songs ("With Me", "Parasite", and "No Idols"). The group also held a number of concerts in Chișinău and Ukraine.

Infected Rain took part in various heavy metal festivals like Red Alert 2008, Metal Heads' Mission 2009, RockHausen 2008/2009, Fuckin'FuckFest 3, Big Up! Urban Fest 2009 (where the band took top billing), and Forest Kap 2009/2010. In the summer of 2009, they released "ЕР2009", composed of six songs (Judgmental Trap, Panika, No More, Escape, Go Away, and Homeless). The combination of female screaming, hard riffs, and electronic samples contributed to Infected Rain's individual style. In the winter of 2010 they shot their first video, for the song "Judgemental Trap". The band then held a number of concerts in Moldova and Romania.

On 25 November 2011, the group released their first full-length album, Asylum, before going on tour in Romania. In January 2012 the band's second music video was released, for the song "At the Bottom of the Bottle". In June 2012 Infected Rain performed on the same stage with well-known bands like Mötley Crüe and Dimmu Borgir. In the summer of 2012 were released two songs with their videos: "Me Against You" (collaborating with Moldova Extreme Moto Cross), and "Stop Waiting". In autumn 2013 Infected Rain saw their largest tour yet, with performances in Romania, Ukraine, Russia, and Bulgaria.

On 15 May 2014 they released a new full-length album titled Embrace Eternity. In the summer of 2014 the group took part at festivals like "FajtFest 2014" (in the Czech Republic), Maraton Festival, Route68 Summerfest and Rockstadt Extreme Fest 2014 in Romania, where it performed along with groups like Obituary, Behemoth, Sodom, Katatonia, The Agonist, and others. The band then embarked on a two-month tour across 12 European countries to support their new album. Next year the band released the songs Serendipity, Intoxicating, Mold, and Fool the Gravity.

On 20 April 2017 was released a new full-length album titled 86, as American English slang for getting rid of something, ejecting someone, or refusing service, which is also appeared to be the birth year of the lead vocalist Lena Sсissorhands (1986). The album features 11 tracks. The three albums were recorded in a Moldovan studio named Must Music, and were produced by Valentin Voluța and Infected Rain.

On 4 May 2023, the band announced the departure of the Babich brothers. At this date, it was also announced that a new bass player, Alice Lane, was joining the band.

Their latest album, TIME, was released on February 9, 2024.

== Musical style ==
The lyrics for Infected Rain songs are written by Lena Sсissorhands, and they are in English. The music is composed mainly by the guitarist Vidick, with contributions from all other members. As a female frontwoman, Lena was noted for her tattoos and her strong vocals. She is coached by New York-based Melissa Cross. For her style, Lena was named by local media "the most eccentric vocalist of Moldova".

== Band members ==
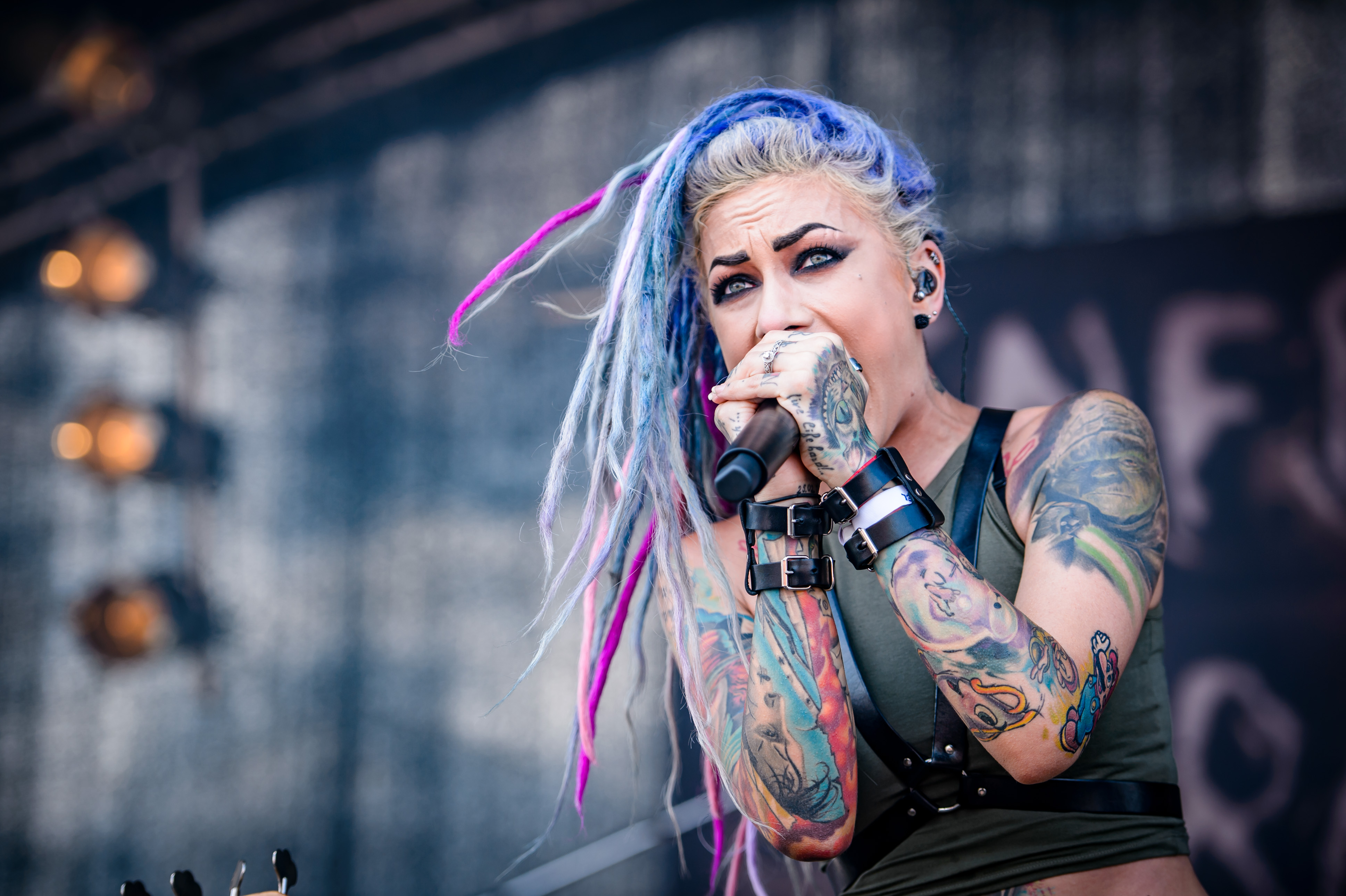
Vocalist Lena Scissorhands

=== Current ===
- Elena "Lena Scissorhands" Cataraga – vocals (2008–present)
- Vadim "Vidick" Ojog – guitars (2008–present)
- Eugen Voluta – drums (2012–present)
- Alice Lane – bass (2023–present)

=== Former ===
- Ivan Kristioglo (DJ Kapa) – disc jockey (2008–2010)
- Andrei "Mednyi" – guitars (2008–2010)
- Vadim Protsenko – drums (2008–2012)
- Vladimir Babich – bass (2008–2023)
- Sergey Babich – guitars (2010–2023)

== Discography ==
=== Studio albums ===
- Asylum (2011)
- Embrace Eternity (2014)
- 86 (2017)
- Endorphin (2019)
- Ecdysis (2022)
- TIME (2024)

=== Live albums ===
- The Devil's Dozen (2023)

=== EPs ===
- Judgemental Trap (2009)

=== Demos ===
- Demo 2008 (2008)

=== Singles ===
- "Stop Waiting" (2013)
- "Serendipity" (2016)
- "Intoxicating" (2016)
- "Mold" (2017)
- "Fool the Gravity" (2017)
- "Passerby" (2019)
- "The Earth Mantra" (2019)
- "Lure" (2019)
- "Storm" (2019)
- "Black Gold" (2019)
- "Postmortem Pt. 1" (2021)
- "Fighter" (2021)
- "The Realm of Chaos" featuring Heidi Shepherd (2022)
- "Longing" (2022)
- "Dying Light" (2023)
- "Never to Return" (2023)
- "Because I Let You" (2023)
- "Vivarium" (2024)
- "Lighthouse" (2024)
- "Stranger" (2026)
