= Lena Scissorhands =

Moldovan singer (born 1986)

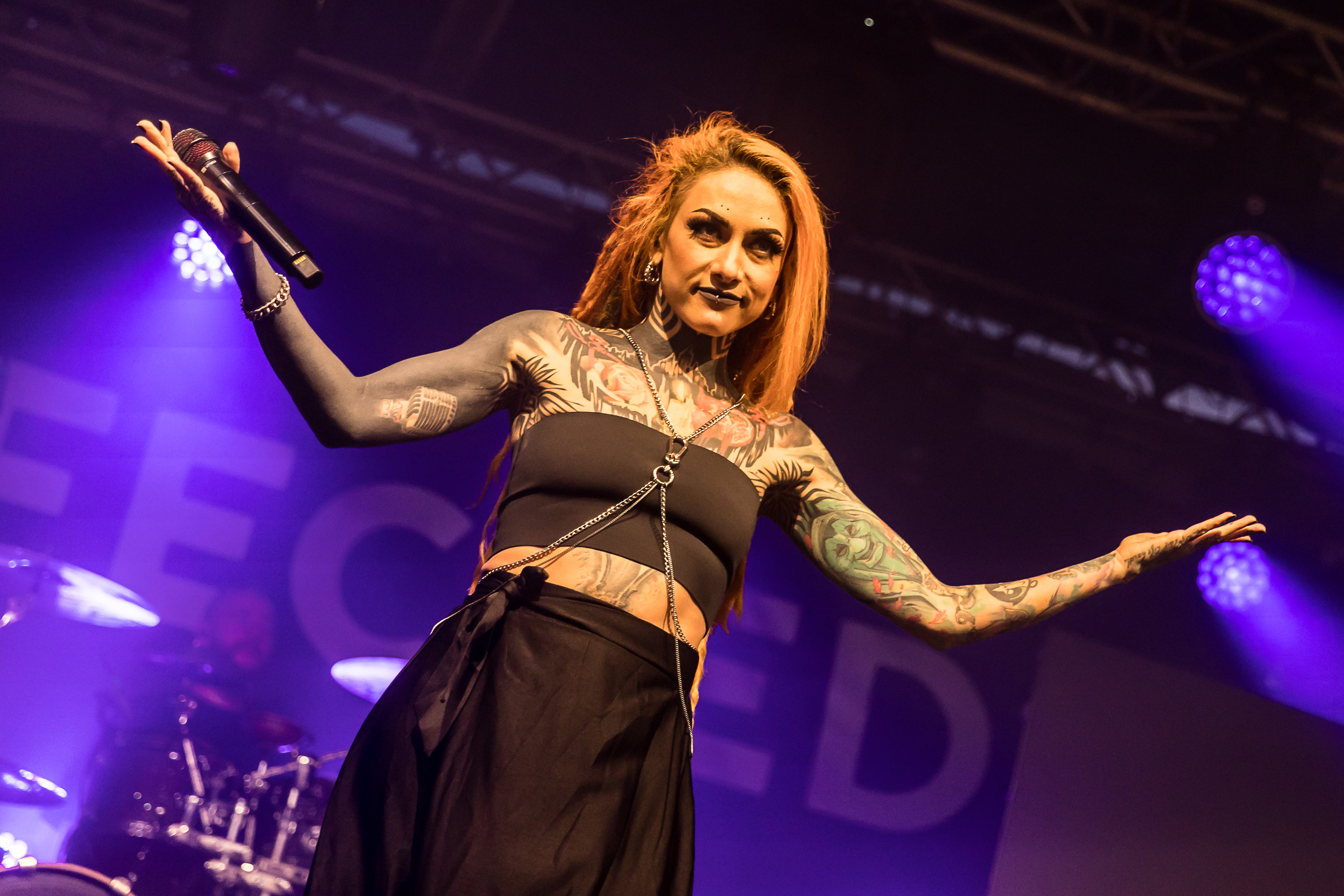
- Scissorhands in 2025

Background information
- Born: Elena Cataraga; 22 November 1986 (age 39); Chișinău, Moldavian SSR, USSR
- Genres: Nu metal; metalcore; groove metal; melodic death metal; alternative metal
- Occupations: Singer; songwriter
- Instrument: Vocals
- Years active: 2008–present
- Member of: Infected Rain
- Formerly of: Death Dealer Union

Elena Cataraga (born 22 November 1986), known professionally as Lena Scissorhands, is a Moldovan heavy metal singer and songwriter, who now resides in the USA. She is the lead singer and one of the founding members of the Moldovan metal band Infected Rain. She is also the former vocalist of the American alternative metal band Death Dealer Union.

== Early life ==
Cataraga was born on 22 November 1986 in Chișinău. As the eldest of three siblings, she grew up in poor circumstances, forcing her to find work at a very young age. Her mother worked as medical assistant. Her father is of Armenian descent, and Lena grew up in a Russian-speaking family in Telecentru sector of Chișinău. Cataraga attended a Romanian-language school in Chișinău, and at the age of 13, she became interested in alternative music. Fascinated by hard riffs and aggressive vocals, she discovered her love for metal music at the age of 14. She later worked as a makeup artist and trained as a hairstylist, giving her the nickname "Scissorhands".

== Musical career ==
=== Infected Rain ===
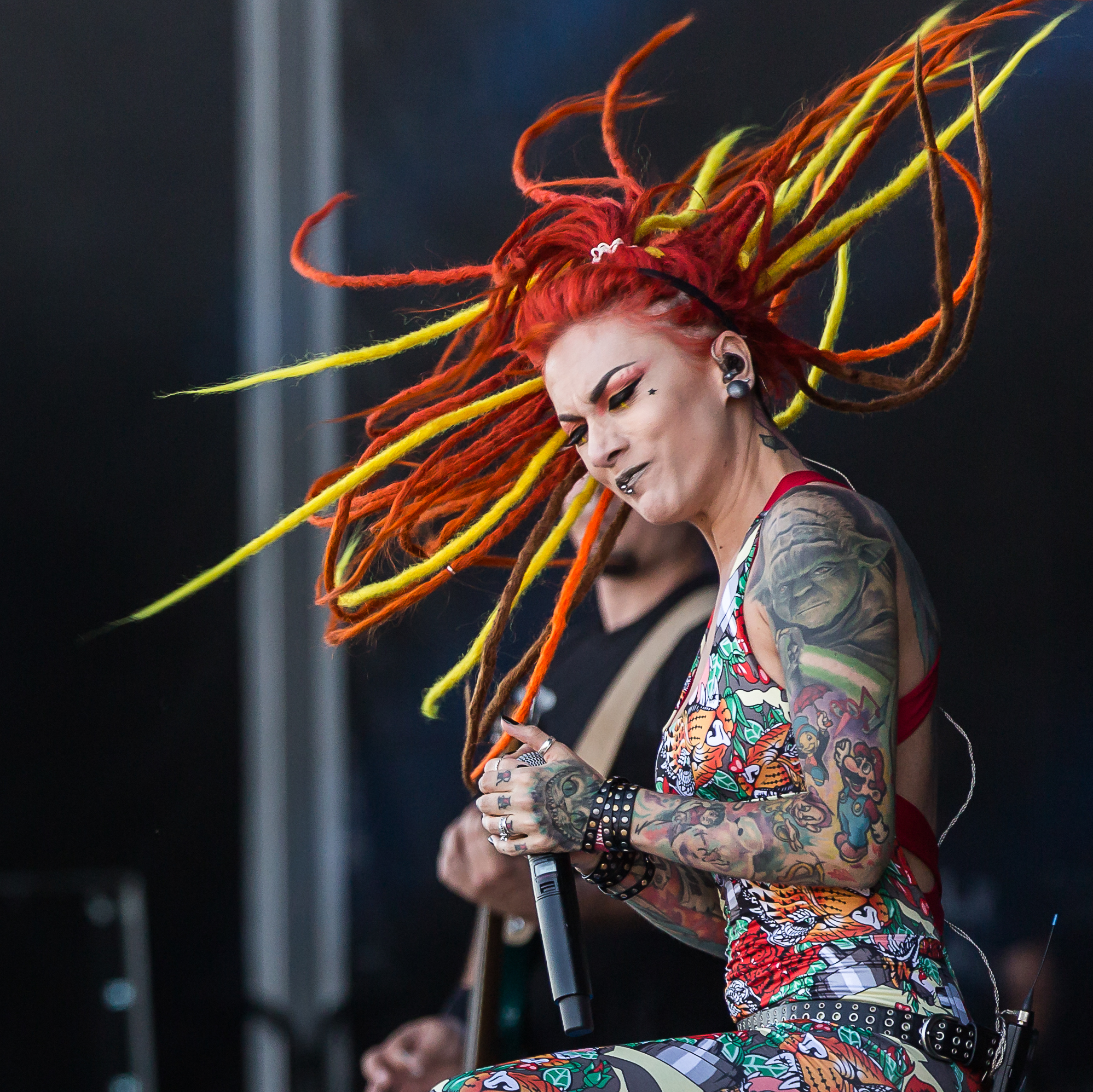
Scissorhands singing with Infected Rain in 2019

In 2008, Scissorhands formed the band Infected Rain with guitarist Vadim "Vidick" Ozhog and Ivan "DJ Kapa" Kristioglo. The band had their first appearance on 3 August 2008 as part of a Slayer tribute concert; the first EP Judgmental Trap followed in 2009. Since she had never had singing lessons before, Scissorhands began taking lessons from singing teacher Tatiana Robertovna. From then on, she also devoted herself to songwriting by writing the lyrics for the songs of Infected Rain. Her lyrics are about personal experiences, fears and disappointments that happened to her in life.

In the years that followed, the band had numerous live appearances at festivals, tours and supporting Eluveitie and Lacuna Coil. In order to meet the growing demands as a singer, Scissorhands took lessons in 2013 from the renowned singing teacher Melissa Cross in New York City, who had already worked with other well-known musicians. On 18 October 2019, the band's fourth studio album Endorphin was released. Once again, Scissorhands wrote the lyrics to all of the songs. The album received mostly positive reviews.

=== Death Dealer Union ===
On April 8, 2022, Death Dealer Union released their first single, Borderlines, featuring Scissorhands. On August 12, the band announced that Scissorhands has officially joined the band. On November 1, they announced that they signed a contract with Napalm Records.

=== Guest appearances and vocal style ===
In addition to singing with Infected Rain, Scissorhands has also guest-sung on other musical projects (including Seas on the Moon, Nu-Nation, Anotherkind, Chase the Comet, Nervosa). A special feature is her guttural singing (growling, screaming); however, she also practices clean singing. The change in vocal technique - very often within the same song - is characteristic of the music of Infected Rain. Due to her style, Scissorhands was named by local media "the most eccentric vocalist of Moldova".

== Personal life ==
Cataraga is a vegan and resides in Las Vegas, Nevada, U.S. She runs her own channel on YouTube. She does not consume drugs nor alcohol but has never given any indication as to whether she is straight edge.

She is also known for her tattoos and she has tattoos of her vocal influences on her leg with one being Mitch Lucker of Suicide Silence and the other being Chino Moreno of Deftones.

== Discography ==
With Infected Rain

With Seas on the Moon

EPs

- 2020: Sanctuary

Singles

- 2016: Hovering
- 2017: Promise
- 2020: Opium
- 2020: Another
- 2020: Sanctuary
- 2021: The Regress
- 2022: The Rule of 21

With Nu-Nation

Singles

- 2016: Let Me Go

With Anotherkind

Singles

- 2020: Aero Zeppelin (Nirvana cover)
- 2021: Back to the Roots (Вернёмся)
- 2021: Listen to Your Heart (Roxette cover)

With Chase the Comet

Singles

- 2020: All the Things She Said (t.A.T.u. cover)

With Awake Again

Singles

- 2021: Busy Doing Nothing

With Oceans

Singles

- 2021: Voices

With Astray Valley

Singles

- 2021: Erased

With Vervain St. Project

Singles

- 2021: Believe
- 2022: Free

With Trembling Sky

Singles

- 2021: Pretend to Fly

With Death Dealer Union

Studio albums

- 2023: Initiation

Singles

- 2022: Borderlines
- 2022: Beneath the Surface

With Metopia

Singles

- 2022: Kriegerin
- 2023: New Dawn

With Staple R

Singles

- 2022: Bumblebee Cemetery

== Bibliography ==
- 2020: Lena Scissorhands’s Lyric Book, created by Vidick
