= Vena Kava =

American singer

- Born: 2 November 1986 (age 39); Zakopane, Poland
- Education: San Francisco Art Institute
- Movement: Avant Garde, New Genre
- Awards: STAND Grant Film Arts Foundation for Independent Cinema
- Website: www.aversion.ca

Vena Kava, born in the Carpathian region of Eastern Europe, is an American artist known mostly for her fantasy art photography and mixed media, singing, and modeling work. Kava originally studied experimental filmmaking at the prestigious San Francisco Art Institute. Kava currently lives in Montreal, Canada.

== Early years ==
Vena Kava was born in Zakopane, Poland where she spent most of her early childhood. When she was 7 years old her family moved to the United States where they have been ever since.

== Filmmaking ==
Kava became interested in the visual arts at college and started painting, taking classes at the Rhode Island School of Design. Becoming frustrated with what she saw as painting's limitation, she abandoned it and moved to Boston to attend Emerson College with a masters specialty in film production. Later in the year, being disappointed with the program, Kava moved to San Francisco and took up experimental and Avant-garde Filmmaking. She decided that the San Francisco Art Institute, a School known for its Laissez-faire attitude towards art, was the only school in America that can offer her the flexibility that she needed in order to fulfill her desire for true experimentation. "[T]here was so much potential I felt in San Francisco, the East Coast Art scene during this time was not really working for me.”

She spent the rest of her college career focused on Filmmaking being heavily influenced by filmmaker Kenneth Anger with films such as Lucifer Rising, Invocation of My Demon Brother, Scorpio Rising and also filmmaker George Kuchar who taught at SFAI. She also started taking classes in New Genre, which was a major available at the school. This short exploration opened up doors and led Vena Kava into the world of performance art.

== Awards ==
In 2005, Kava was the recipient of one of the prestigious STAND grants from The Film Arts Foundation for independent cinema. She made a short experimental film “She Blow Smoke,” which was highly influenced by Keneth Anger and highlighted some of her early frustrations and personal conflicts.

== Music ==
Kava's first band was WhipKraft which was San Francisco based, in which she led, performed, and sang. In the band released a Goth/Metal/ Experimental album titled “Welcome to the Chapel Perilous.” While she lived in Boston, she renamed WhipKraft as Killing Moon, a Death Metal band. Kava incorporating the death growl into her vocal style, which was also proved to be a big hit among her fans.

In 2012 Vena Kave moved to Montreal, Canada where she is currently the lead singer of Aversion, a black metal band.

== Photography ==
Having a love for all art, Kava experimented with many genres if art, but only a few of them stuck. Photography was one of them, when Kava discovered the beauty of the still image. “[I] have been feeling like everything is moving so fast lately, year after year, even film is too fast for me 24 frames per second is a lot of frames for the eye to consume. Photography was perfect, I can meditate on one frame for days and even months.” Kava works typically by photographing herself in a range of costumes, heavily influenced by Photographer Cindy Sherman.
