= Angelica Rylin =

Swedish singer, songwriter and composer (born 1981)

- Born: Angelica Rylin; 27 December 1981 (age 43); Stockholm, Sweden
- Origin: Swedish, Australian
- Genres: Symphonic metal, gothic metal, gothic rock, melodic rock, hard rock, AOR
- Occupations: Singer-songwriter, musician, composer
- Instrument: Vocals
- Years active: 2003–present
- Labels: Frontiers Records, AFM
- Member of: The Murder of My Sweet
- Website: ~~angelica.themurderofmysweet.com~~ N.A

Angelica Maria Estelle Rylin (born 27 December 1981) is a Swedish singer, songwriter and composer, best known as the vocalist of the cinematic metal band The Murder of My Sweet. She has also established a solo career that she named Angelica, which taps into the late 1980s and early 1990s Metal AOR. She sings in the mezzo-soprano range.

== Career ==
Rylin has been featured on albums since 2004 but her singing career took off in 2007 when she started working with drummer, producer and songwriter Daniel Flores. The two shared the same interests and passion for film scores which drew them into forming the Cinematic Metal band The Murder of My Sweet. Their first album, Divanity, was released by Frontiers Records in 2010. The single that preceded it in 2009, "Bleed Me Dry", reached No. 14 in the Swedish National Singles Charts. Their second album, Bye Bye Lullaby, gained the band more recognition and came out in 2012 on AFM Records. That same year, Rylin was featured in the song “Holding me down” for the Swedish movie Isdraken, directed by Martin Högdahl, and screened in theatres. In 2013 Angelica returned to Frontiers Records to release her first Solo album called Thrive. The album taps into the late 1980s, early 1990s melodic rock and AOR but with a modern production. As a songwriter, Rylin has worked with artists like Jesper Strömblad, Magnus Karlsson (guitarist), Fredrik Åkesson, Peter Wichers, Harry Hess, Bobby Ljunggren, Peter Kvint and Magnus Funemyr. She has written songs both for her solo project, her band and other international bands and artists. For example the famous Japanese singer/actress/model Anna Tsuchiya and Japanese pop duo Tackey & Tsubasa.

== Discography ==
=== Singles ===
With The Murder of My Sweet

- "Bleed Me Dry" (2009)
- "Tonight" (2010)
- "Unbreakable" (2012)

As Angelica

- "Breaking My heart" (2013)
- "Calling" (2020)

=== Albums ===
With The Murder of My Sweet

- Divanity (2010)
- Bye Bye Lullaby (2012)
- Beth Out of Hell (2015)
- Echoes of the Aftermath (2017)
- Brave Tin World (2019)
- A Gentleman's Legacy (2021)

As Angelica

- Thrive (2013)
- All I Am (2020)

=== Guest appearance & backing vocals ===
With Play (Swedish group)

- Play Around the Christmas Tree (2004)

With Chrash the System

- The Crowning (2009)

With Jan Johansen (singer)

- En ny bild av mig (2010)

With Isdraken the movie

- Holding me down (2012)

With Joe Lynn Turner, Rated X

- Rated X (2014)

=== As songwriter ===
For Tackey & Tsubasa

- I Came Here to Get (2008)

For Anna Tsuchiya

- Shout in the Rain (2010)

For Xorigin

- Mend My Heart (2011)

For Issa

- Black Clouds (2011)

== Music videos ==
With The Murder of My Sweet

- "Bleed me dry" (2009)
- "The Murder of My Sweet Photo session" (2009)
- "Follow the rain" (2010)
- "Unbreakable" (2012)
- "Black September" (2012)

With Angelica

- "Breaking my heart" (2013)
- "Thrive - EPK" (2013)
