= Killing Moon (band) =

American death metal band

- Origin: Boston
- Genres: Heavy metal, Death metal, Black metal, Power metal
- Years active: 2004 – present
- Labels: Rakehell Records
- Members: Vena Kava; Mike Desmond; Hammer Ash
- Website: http://www.killingmoon.us

Killing Moon is a Boston, Massachusetts-based, female-fronted death metal band, formally known as WhipKraft. Vena Kava, the lead singer and founder of the band, specializes in the death growl.

== History ==
WhipKraft started out as a duo in San Francisco’s industrial Rocker Studios as a musical experiment. Vena Kava officially formed WhipKraft in 2004. However, in 2003, Kava met The Slough Feg to form the early foundations of the band. WhipKraft was soon a live circuit act, with Slough Feg members backing Kava; these included, Maestas, Mike Scalzi and Greg Ha. WhipKraft was a full-on theatrical performance, with dancers, performers and costumes. In 2007, WhipKraft released their debut album Welcome to the Chapel Perilous.

Killing Moon draws from the following musical influences: Iron Maiden, Children of Bodom, Slayer, Behemoth, Megadeth, Stratovarius, Dimmu Borgir, Arch Enemy and Fear of God.

The band was originally named WhipKraft, but, in 2009, the band changed their name to Killing Moon.

== Album information ==
Welcome to the Chapel Perilous was released in 2007. In the summer of 2007, WhipKraft released their single WE MUST DIE. In 2009, Killing Moon released a collectors double-track album, "Twilight Holocaust." Currently, Killing Moon is working on a concept album, Four Horsemen of the Apocalypse.

== Discography ==
- Welcome to the Chapel Perilous (2007)
- "WE MUST DIE" single (2007)
- "Twilight Holocaust" (double track) (2009)

== Videos ==
Twilight Holocaust (2009)

== Current members ==
- Vena Kava (vocalist/death growl)
- Mike Desmond (lead guitarist)
- Hammer Ash (drums)

== Former members ==
- Mike Scalzi (guitar) Slough Feg
- Mark Baggot (guitar)
- Troy Arajas (drums)
- Colin Delaney (drums)
- Lee Grof (drums)
- Hammer Ash (drums)
- Greg Haa (drums) Slough Feg
- Patrick Marcoux (bass)
