= Deb Obarski =

American singer (born 1969)

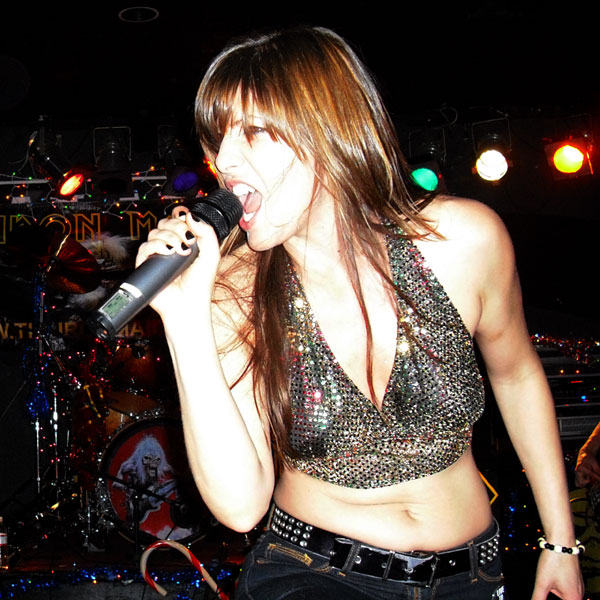
- Deb Obarski performing with The Iron Maidens

Background information
- Also known as: Blizzy Osbourne (The Little Dolls)
- Born: December 10, 1969 (age 55)
- Origin: San Jose, California, US
- Genres: Heavy Metal; Tribute; Contemporary Christian
- Occupation: Singer
- Member of: The Little Dolls, Diary of a Madwoman
- Formerly of: The Iron Maidens

Debbie Obarski (born December 10, 1969) is an American singer, best known as the frontwoman of the Ozzy Osbourne tribute bands The Little Dolls and Diary of a Madwoman, as well as a short stint with The Iron Maidens.

== Biography ==
Deb Obarski was born and raised in San Jose, California, where she took up singing through her sister and grandmother, as well as in church and school choirs.

At the age of 21, Obarski began her career as a cover band singer. Two years later, she moved to Los Angeles, where she performed a handful of her original compositions at coffee houses. Eventually, she joined a local cover band before it disbanded a year later. Shortly after recording a demo of her original songs, Obarski retired from the music scene for 10 years – eventually marrying, buying a home and divorcing within that time span.

Not too long after her divorce, Obarski returned to her musical roots, singing with a heavy metal cover band part-time before joining the all-female Ozzy Osbourne tribute band The Little Dolls (named after a song from Osbourne's second album Diary of a Madman) from 2006 to 2009. As the frontwoman of the Dolls, her stage name was "Blizzy Osbourne", a wordplay on Osbourne's solo debut Blizzard of Ozz. In addition, she fronted another Osbourne tribute band called Diary of a Madwoman from 2007 to 2009.

In July 2008, Obarski joined The Iron Maidens ("World's Only Female Tribute to Iron Maiden") to tour Kuwait and Iraq after their lead vocalist Aja Kim departed from the band. As a substitute musician, she continued to tour with the Maidens in the U.S. for the remainder of the year, as they continue to hold auditions for a new vocalist.

Obarski continues to write songs, mainly contemporary Christian music. She currently runs a cover band called CoverLand (featuring members of the Metallica tribute Damage Inc. and the Judas Priest tribute Just Like Priest). In addition, she occasionally plays the role of Sister Mary in the Queensrÿche tribute Empÿre. While not performing on stage, she works as a massage therapist.

Aside from Osbourne, Obarski cites Pat Benatar as a musical influence.

== Discography ==
=== The Little Dolls ===
- Girls Got Rhythm! (Various artists) (2006)
  - "I Don't Know"
