= Eilera =

French rock/metal musician

- Born: Aurélie Potin Suau
- Origin: Montpellier, France
- Genres: Art rock, folk-rock, celtic metal, art metal, pop rock, experimental rock, gothic rock, progressive metal
- Occupations: singer, songwriter
- Instruments: vocals, guitar, programming
- Years active: 1998–present
- Labels: Spinefarm Records, Adipocère Records, Indie, Echozone (DE), Inverse Records (FI)
- Website: https://eileraofficial.com/

Eilera, born Aurélie Potin Suau, is a French songwriter, guitarist, and producer known for her work within rock and metal genres.

== Biography ==
=== Early life ===
Eilera was born Aurélie Potin Suau in Montpellier, France on 13 August 1986. She began taking classical guitar lessons at the age of twelve.

At the age of seventeen, Eilera began playing electric guitar and experimented with metal music. At the age of nineteen she attempted to form her own metal band, but was unsuccessful in recruiting other players until she entered the metal scene in Montpellier, where she formed a band, Suspiria.

The band's name was later changed to Chrysalis and they released Between Strength and Frailty, a demo distributed by French record label Adipocere Records. Eilera and Chrysalis guitarist Loïc Tézénas worked on a side project called Bliss, which mixed electronic music with metal music.

=== 2003 - 2011 ===
Chrysalis disbanded in 2003, and Eilera and Tézénas focused on the side project, now known as Eilera. In 2003, they self-released their first album, Facettes.

In 2004, the band Eilera signed a recording contract with Finnish label Spinefarm Records. They worked with record producer Hiili Hiilesmaa, cellist Max Lilja, and drummer Antti Lehtinen to record their first album for Spinefarm, an EP titled Precious Moment (2005). In 2007, Eilera released her first solo studio album, Fusion, which she had recorded with Hiilesmaa, Lilja, and Lehtinen.

=== 2011 - 2019 ===
Eilera began working independently after the purchase of Spinefarm by Universal Music Group. In 2011, Eilera self-released the album Darker Chapter… and stars. This featured Jan Sormo on Bass, Loïc Tézénas on Guitar, and Eilera's Vocals.

After touring France, Eilera ended her collaboration with Tézénas and moved to Finland, where she currently resides.

In Finland, Eilera worked on new collaborations, including one with Pariisin Kevät on a first album, Meteoriitti, which featured French and Finnish songwriting and original compositions by Eilera. She also began collaborating with Celtic harp player Lily Neill. They practised together at Sibelius Academy and re-recorded many of Eilera's earlier songs, as well as the Tori Amos song Winter.

Eilera began recording her next studio album, Face Your Demons (2016), at Finnvox with old friend Tero Kinnunen of Nightwish, but ultimately opted for a more intimate sound and recorded the remainder of the album live in studio. Five official videos were released in support of the album, three of them shot live in studio for the songs Angel Made Temptress, Deadly Together and Your Way. The videos were shot by Eilera's friend Mitja Harvilahti, who collaborated with Chilean visual artist David Letelier for two of the videos for "Face Your Demons" and "Male Female Balance."

In January 2019, Eilera released an acoustic-based album, Waves, with a photograph taken from the Finnvox Studios in Helsinki. She stated on Facebook that Waves was a Franco/Finnish/Chilean collaboration.

== Discography ==
Title	Type	Release date	Label
Facettes	Demo Album	2003	Self-Released
Precious Moment	EP	2005	Spinefarm Records
Fusion	Studio Album	2007	Spinefarm Records
Darker Chapter... and stars, Part I	Studio Album	2010	Self-Released
Darker Chapter… and stars, Part II	Studio album	2012	Self-Released
Frozen Path	Single	2014	Self-Released
Into the Sea	Single	2014	Self-Released
Face Your Demons	Studio Album	2016	Echozone
Waves	Studio Album	2019	Inverse Records
