= The Great Kat =

American musician

- Born: Katherine Thomas; June 6, 1966 (age 60); Swindon, England
- Origin: United States
- Genres: Speed metal; heavy metal; thrash metal; neoclassical metal; power metal; melodic death metal; instrumental rock
- Occupation: Musician
- Instruments: Guitar, vocals, violin
- Years active: 1986–present
- Label: Roadrunner
- Members: Kat; Jeff Ingegno; Lionel Cordew
- Past members: Tom Von Doom; Chip Marshall; Adam Killa; Kevin Dedario; Scott Borrero; Rob “Banks” Fitkin
- Website: greatkat.com

Katherine Thomas (born June 6, 1966), best known by her stage name The Great Kat, is an American guitarist and singer best known for her thrash metal interpretations of well-known pieces of classical music. Most feature her using the electric guitar, but on some she uses the violin. Thomas is a classically trained violinist, graduating from the Juilliard School and touring for a time playing conventional classical music before crossing over to metal.

Her classical background, technical skills and self-promotion are sometimes compared to Yngwie Malmsteen . In an interview in metallian.com she claimed to be the reincarnation of Beethoven.

Her public persona, as portrayed in her publicity photos and videos, is mainly compared to that of a dominatrix, albeit in an over-the-top, tongue-in-cheek manner.

In 1990, Swiss black metal band Mordor recorded for their first demo tape "Odes" a tribute song for Thomas, titled "The Great Kat Is God".

== Discography ==
- 1986 – Satan Says (demo)
- 1987 – Worship Me or Die!
- 1990 – Beethoven on Speed
- 1996 – Digital Beethoven on Cyberspeed (EP)
- 1997 – Guitar Goddess (EP)
- 1998 – Bloody Vivaldi (EP)
- 2000 – Rossini's Rape (EP)
- 2002 – Wagner's War (EP)
- 2005 – Extreme Guitar Shred (DVD)
- 2008 – Total Insanity (compilation)
- 2021 – Mozart Beethoven Bach and Shred (EP)
- 2021 – Beethoven, Beethoven and the Reincarnation of Beethoven (EP)
- 2022 – Ludwig Van Shred
