= The Murder of My Sweet =

Swedish metal band

- Origin: Stockholm, Sweden
- Genres: Symphonic metal, gothic metal
- Years active: 2007–present
- Labels: Frontiers Records
- Members: Angelica Rylin; Daniel Flores; Patrik Janson; Mike Palace
- Website: Official MySpace-Site

The Murder of My Sweet is a Swedish metal band, based in Stockholm and founded in 2007.

== Band history ==
The Murder of My Sweet was founded in Stockholm in 2007 by drummer and producer Daniel Flores. It consists of Angelica Rylin (vocals), Patrik Janson (bass), Christopher Vetter (guitar), and Daniel Flores (drums and keyboards). Their debut single Bleed Me Dry reached 14th spot in the national Swedish singles chart. In January 2010, they released their debut album Divanity on the Italian label Frontiers Records.

== Music ==
The lyrics deal with personal experiences, and the music is influenced by books and movie soundtracks.

== Band name ==
The band's name was inspired by the 1944 film noir Murder, My Sweet.

== Band members ==
- Angelica Rylin - vocals
- Mike Palace - guitar
- Patrik Janson - bass
- Daniel Flores - drums, keyboard, backing vocals

== Discography ==
Studio albums

- 2010: Divanity
- 2012: Bye Bye Lullaby
- 2015: Beth Out of Hell
- 2017: Echoes of the Aftermath
- 2019: Brave Tin World
- 2021: A Gentleman's Legacy

Singles

- 2009: "Bleed Me Dry"
- 2010: "Tonight"
- 2012: "Unbreakable"
- 2015: "The Humble Servant"
- 2015: "The Awakening"
- 2017: "Personal Hell"
