= Melissa Cross =

American vocal coach (born 1957)

- Born: 1957 (age 68–69)
- Other name: Scream Queen
- Education: Interlochen Arts Academy; Bristol Old Vic Theatre School
- Occupation: Vocal coach
- Notable work: The Zen of Screaming
- Website: melissacross.com

Melissa Cross is an American vocal coach known for her technical improvements in screaming. She has worked with actors and musicians across genres, mainly in heavy metal and its subgenres, and also in grunge. After damaging her own vocal cords, she developed techniques to scream without injury, which she teaches to reduce strain on the vocal cords.

== Early life and education ==
Cross grew up in Texas, where she enjoyed participating in ballet, piano, and choir. At the age of seven, she developed a love for rock music. Cross struggled to sound like the vocalists she enjoyed until she imitated her idol, Janis Joplin.

Cross studied at the Interlochen Arts Academy and graduated from Bristol Old Vic Theatre School, where she focused on singing for theatre and traditional opera.

== Career ==
After graduating, she initially moved to California, eventually settling in New York in the 1980s. In New York, she worked for record companies and music-business lawyers. She also played in punk bands. Cross damaged her vocal cords trying to achieve the sounds she wanted, causing her to research speech pathology, speech therapy, and the mechanisms of speaking in an effort to heal herself. She also found ways to scream without hurting herself as a result. In the mid-1990s, Cross was asked by a friend to train the vocalists of bands he was producing, noticing that they were also damaging their voices. Her association with those bands allowed Cross to use her classical voice training in combination with the new techniques she discovered. The typical lesson focuses on techniques to reduce strain on the vocal cords, which is the main source of injury.

Cross's first student was going to be Jamey Jasta of Hatebreed, although he never appeared for his lesson.

In 2005, Cross released an instructional DVD, which taught viewers the basics of screaming vocal techniques, titled The Zen of Screaming: Vocal Instruction for a New Breed. The tutorial became a cult classic amongst peers in the metal scene.

In 2008, it was reported in The Seattle Times that Cross had taught a master's class at Columbia University, focusing on screaming techniques.

Beginning in 2009, Cross has given annual presentations on her vocal methodologies to classical voice teachers, voice physicians, and voice therapists at the Voice Foundation Annual Symposium.

In 2017, Cross collaborated with voice scientist Ingo Titze to conduct a workshop at the Pan American Voice Association Congress, presenting four types of intentional vocal distortions. The research emphasized that, when performed correctly, these techniques do not cause hoarseness or vocal damage.

Throughout her career, Cross has worked with prominent musicians and bands, including Jonathan Davis of Korn, Courtney Love of Hole, Angela Gossow of Arch Enemy, Jesse Leach of Killswitch Engage, Randy Blythe of Lamb of God, Andrew W.K., Melissa Auf der Maur, Slipknot, Sick of It All, Thursday, Shadows Fall, Slayer, Cradle of Filth, Unearth, Maroon 5, The Bravery, Ben Lee, Shinedown, Coheed and Cambria, Stone Sour, Megadeth, Sara Bareilles, A Day to Remember, Beartooth, Bring Me the Horizon, Chiodos, The Devil Wears Prada, Disturbed, Every Time I Die, Falling in Reverse, Halestorm, Taking Back Sunday, Trivium, and Volbeat. She has also worked with actors, such as Kevin Bacon. Cross is a member of The Voice Foundation, the National Association of Teachers of Singing, and the Pan American Vocology Association.

== Filmography ==
Year	Title
2005	The Zen of Screaming: Vocal Instruction for a New Breed
2007	The Zen of Screaming 2
2008	Scream Queens

== Recognition ==
In July 2025, Cross was presented with a Lifetime Achievement Award from the Contemporary Commercial Music Vocal Pedagogy Institute at Shenandoah University.
