= Disturbed discography =

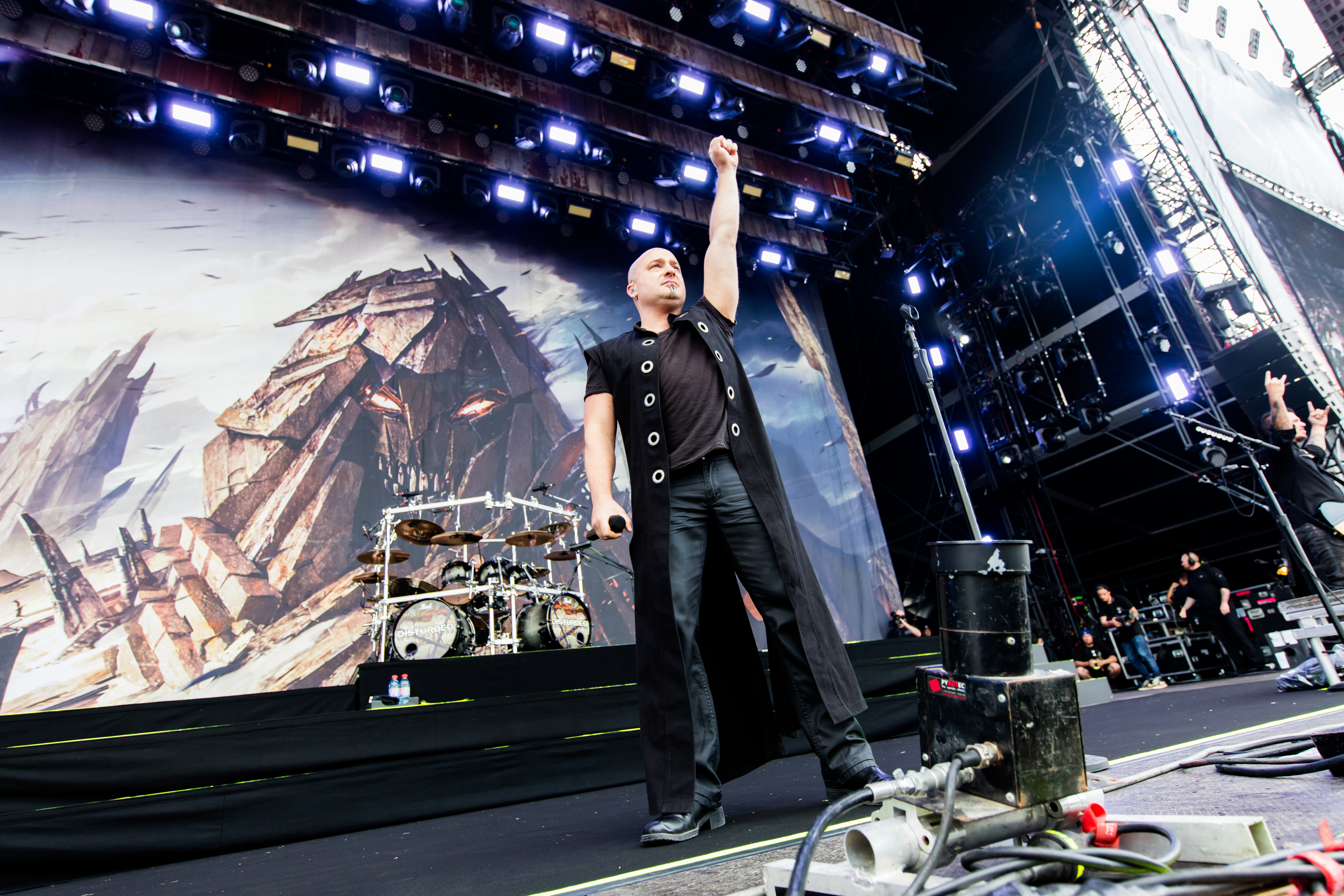
- Disturbed at Rock am Ring 2016
- Studio albums: 8
- Extended plays: 1
- Live albums: 2
- Compilation albums: 1
- Singles: 31
- Video albums: 3
- Music videos: 27

The discography of American heavy metal band Disturbed includes eight studio albums, two live albums, one compilation album, one extended play, 31 singles, three video albums, and 27 music videos. The band formed when guitarist Dan Donegan, drummer Mike Wengren and bassist Steve "Fuzz" Kmak hired vocalist David Draiman in 1996. A demo tape led to their signing to Giant Records, which released their debut album, The Sickness, in March 2000. The album reached the top 30 on the United States' Billboard 200, and the Australian ARIA Charts. Since its release, The Sickness was certified 5× platinum, a measure of its high sales volume, in the US by the Recording Industry Association of America (RIAA), 3× platinum in Canada by Music Canada, platinum in both Australia by the Australian Recording Industry Association (ARIA) and New Zealand by Recorded Music NZ (RMNZ), and gold in the United Kingdom by the British Phonographic Industry (BPI). Four singles were released from the album, "Stupify", "Voices", "The Game", and "Down with the Sickness"; the latter of which was the most successful, having been certified eight-times platinum by the RIAA.

In March 2002, Disturbed released the documentary M.O.L., which showed some of the band's more personal moments in the studio and during tours, and featured several music videos and live performances. M.O.L. was later certified platinum by ARIA. Disturbed then released their second studio album, Believe, in September 2002. It peaked at number one on the US Billboard 200 and New Zealand's Recorded Music NZ (RMNZ) charts, as well as number two on the Canadian Albums Chart. Believe was certified double platinum by the RIAA, and platinum by ARIA and Music Canada (MC). The album's first single, "Prayer", peaked at number 14 on the Canadian Singles Chart, and number 31 on the UK Singles Chart. A music video directed by the Brothers Strause included the song, but because scenes in the video resembled footage of the September 11 attacks, most television stations refused to play it. The single was followed-up by "Remember", which failed to reach the success of its predecessor. The 2003 tour Music as a Weapon II was documented on the live album, which also featured the bands Taproot, Chevelle, and Ünloco. It was released in February 2004, and reached number 148 on the US Billboard 200.

Three years after the release of Believe, Disturbed released their third studio album, Ten Thousand Fists, in September 2005. The album reached the same positions that its predecessor had; topping the US Billboard 200 and New Zealand RIANZ charts, and peaking at number two on the Canadian Albums Charts. It also was certified 3× platinum in the US, 2× in Canada, platinum in Australia, and gold in Germany, New Zealand and the United Kingdom. Ten Thousand Fists spawned singles such as "Guarded", "Just Stop", the Genesis cover of "Land of Confusion", and "Stricken". The latter charted at number 95 on the US Billboard Hot 100, and at number 88 on the UK Singles Chart. "Stricken" was later certified 3× platinum by the RIAA. Disturbed's fourth studio album, Indestructible, was released in June 2008. Like its predecessor, it peaked at number one on the US and New Zealand charts; it also reached the top position of the Canadian and Australian charts. Four singles were released for Indestructible, the title track, "Perfect Insanity", "The Night" and "Inside the Fire" (which peaked at number-one on the Mainstream Rock Songs, was certified 2× platinum by the RIAA, and was nominated for a Grammy Award in the category Best Hard Rock Performance). The band has released five consecutive number-one albums that have charted on the Billboard 200, with the release of their fifth studio album Asylum. Asylum was followed five years later by Immortalized (2015). The album featured a cover of "The Sound of Silence", which became their highest peaking song on the Billboard Hot 100, peaking at number 42 and was certified nine-times platinum by the RIAA.

== Albums ==
=== Studio albums ===
List of studio albums, with selected chart positions
Title	Album details	Peak chart positions										Sales	Certifications
Title	Album details	US	AUS	AUT	CAN	GER	NLD	NZ	SWE	SWI	UK	Sales	Certifications
The Sickness	Released: March 7, 2000; Label: Giant, Reprise; Formats: CD, CS, LP	29	30	—	—	81	—	—	—	—	102	US: 4,200,000; UK: 145,989	RIAA: 5× Platinum; ARIA: Platinum; BPI: Gold; MC: 3× Platinum; RMNZ: Platinum
Believe	Released: September 17, 2002; Label: Reprise; Format: CD, LP, CS, DVD-A	1	32	42	2	68	—	1	35	91	41	US: 1,800,000	RIAA: 2× Platinum; ARIA: Platinum; BPI: Gold; MC: Platinum; RMNZ: Gold
Ten Thousand Fists	Released: September 19, 2005; Label: Reprise; Format: CD, LP, CS	1	11	37	2	21	87	1	24	62	59	US: 1,900,000	RIAA: 3× Platinum; ARIA: Platinum; BPI: Gold; BVMI: Gold; MC: 2× Platinum; RMNZ: Gold
Indestructible	Released: June 3, 2008; Label: Reprise; Format: CD, LP	1	1	10	1	11	57	1	15	15	20	US: 1,100,000	RIAA: 2× Platinum; ARIA: Platinum; BPI: Gold; BVMI: Gold; MC: 3× Platinum; RMNZ: 2× Platinum
Asylum	Released: August 31, 2010; Label: Reprise; Format: CD, DL, LP	1	2	3	2	4	22	1	7	14	7		RIAA: Gold; ARIA: Platinum; BPI: Gold; MC: 2× Platinum; RMNZ: Platinum
Immortalized	Released: August 21, 2015; Label: Reprise; Format: CD, DL, LP	1	1	2	1	2	11	2	9	5	8	US: 507,000	RIAA: 2× Platinum; ARIA: Platinum; BPI: Gold; BVMI: Platinum; IFPI AUT: Gold; MC: 2× Platinum; RMNZ: 2× Platinum
Evolution	Released: October 19, 2018; Label: Reprise; Format: CD, DL, LP	4	3	5	4	2	28	2	9	4	7	US: 430,000	BPI: Silver; RMNZ: Gold
Divisive	Released: November 18, 2022; Label: Reprise; Format: CD, DL, LP	13	5	11	9	9	78	7	—	11	17	US: 184,000	
"—" denotes a recording that did not chart or was not released in that territory.

=== Compilation albums ===
List of compilation albums, with selected chart positions
Title	Album details	Peak chart positions									Sales
Title	Album details	US	AUS	AUT	CAN	GER	NZ	SWE	SWI	UK	Sales
The Lost Children	Released: November 8, 2011; Label: Reprise; Format: CD, DI	13	12	35	17	29	10	59	59	85	US: 238,000

=== Live albums ===
List of live albums, with selected chart positions
Title	Album details	Peak chart positions	
Title	Album details	US	AUS
Music as a Weapon II	Released: February 24, 2004; Label: Reprise; Format: CD, DVD	148	—
Live at Red Rocks	Released: November 18, 2016; Label: Reprise; Format: CD	98	43
"—" denotes a recording that did not chart or was not released in that territory.

== Extended plays ==
Title	EP details
Live & Indestructible (Note: Live & Indestructible was released exclusively through iTunes Store for digital download and at Hot Topic stores for CD release.)	Released: September 30, 2008; Label: Reprise; Formats: DL, CD

== Singles ==
=== 2000s ===
Year	Song	Peak chart positions										Certifications	Album
Year	Song	US	US Alt.	US Main.	US Rock	US Hard Rock Digital	AUS	CAN	FIN	NZ	UK	Certifications	Album
2000	"Stupify"	— (Note: "Stupify" did not enter the US Billboard Hot 100, but peaked at number 12 on the Bubbling Under Hot 100 chart.)	10	12	×	14	—	—	—	—	—	RIAA: 2× Platinum; ARIA: Gold; MC: Gold; RMNZ: Gold	The Sickness
2000	"Down with the Sickness"	— (Note: "Down with the Sickness" did not enter the US Billboard Hot 100, but peaked at number 4 on the Bubbling Under Hot 100 chart.)	8	5	×	2	—	—	—	—	— (Note: "Down With the Sickness" did not enter the UK Singles Chart, but peaked at number 37 on the UK Rock & Metal Singles Chart.)	RIAA: 8× Platinum; ARIA: 4× Platinum; BPI: Platinum; BVMI: Gold; MC: 6× Platinum; RMNZ: 4× Platinum	The Sickness
2000	"Voices"	—	18	16	×	—	—	—	—	—	52	RIAA: Gold	The Sickness
2001	"The Game"	—	—	34	×	—	—	—	—	—	—	RIAA: Gold; ARIA: Gold; MC: Gold	The Sickness
2002	"Prayer"	58	3	3	×	—	—	14	—	—	31	RIAA: Gold; MC: Gold	Believe
2002	"Remember"	— (Note: "Remember" did not enter the US Billboard Hot 100, but peaked at number 10 on the Bubbling Under Hot 100 chart.)	22	6	×	—	—	—	—	—	56		Believe
2003	"Liberate"	— (Note: "Liberate" did not enter the US Billboard Hot 100, but peaked at number 21 on the Bubbling Under Hot 100 chart.)	22	4	×	—	—	—	—	—	—		Believe
2005	"Guarded"	— (Note: "Guarded" did not enter the US Billboard Hot 100, but peaked at number 17 on the Bubbling Under Hot 100 chart.)	28	7	×	—	—	—	—	—	—		Ten Thousand Fists
2005	"Stricken"	95	13	2	×	17	—	—	—	—	88	RIAA: 3× Platinum; ARIA: Platinum; BPI: Silver; MC: 2× Platinum; RMNZ: Platinum	Ten Thousand Fists
2006	"Just Stop"	—	24	4	×	—	—	—	—	—	—		Ten Thousand Fists
2006	"Land of Confusion" (Genesis cover)	— (Note: "Land of Confusion" did not enter the US Billboard Hot 100, but peaked at number 5 on the Bubbling Under Hot 100 chart.)	18	1	×	—	— (Note: "Land of Confusion" did not enter the Billboard Canadian Hot 100, but peaked at number 8 on the Canadian Rock chart.)	—	—	—	79	RIAA: Platinum; ARIA: Gold; MC: Platinum; RMNZ: Gold	Ten Thousand Fists
2006	"Ten Thousand Fists"	—	37	7	×	—	—	—	—	—	—	RIAA: Platinum; ARIA: Gold; MC: Platinum; RMNZ: Gold	Ten Thousand Fists
2008	"Inside the Fire"	73	4	1	×	—	43	60	19	18	—	RIAA: 2× Platinum; ARIA: Gold; MC: Platinum; RMNZ: Platinum	Indestructible
2008	"Indestructible"	72	10	2	×	—	57	—	—	—	— (Note: "Indestructible" did not enter the UK Singles Chart, but peaked at number 34 on the UK Singles Sales Chart.)	RIAA: 2× Platinum; ARIA: Platinum; BPI: Silver; MC: 2× Platinum; RMNZ: Gold	Indestructible
2009	"The Night"	—	18	2	8	—	—	—	—	—	—	RIAA: Gold; MC: Gold	Indestructible
"—" denotes a recording that did not chart or was not released in that territory. "×" denotes periods where charts did not exist or were not archived.

=== 2010s ===
Year	Song	Peak chart positions										Certifications	Album
Year	Song	US	US Alt.	US Main.	US Rock	AUS	CAN	FIN	NZ	SWE	UK	Certifications	Album
2010	"Another Way to Die"	81	15	1	1	—	62	—	—	—	— (Note: "Another Way to Die" did not enter the UK Singles Chart, but peaked at number 10 on the UK Rock & Metal Singles Chart.)	RIAA: Gold	Asylum
2010	"The Animal"	—	20	2	6	—	—	—	—	—	—	RIAA: Gold	Asylum
2011	"Warrior"	— (Note: "Warrior" did not enter the US Billboard Hot 100, but peaked at number 3 on the Bubbling Under Hot 100 chart.)	29	4	14	—	—	—	—	—	—	RIAA: Gold; MC: Gold	Asylum
2011	"Hell"	—	— (Note: "Hell" did not enter the US Billboard Alternative Airplay chart, but peaked at number 8 on the US Alternative Digital Song Sales chart.)	15	35	—	—	—	—	—	—		The Lost Children
2015	"The Vengeful One"	—	— (Note: "The Vengeful One" did not enter the US Billboard Alternative Airplay chart, but peaked at number 7 on the US Alternative Digital Song Sales chart.)	1	17	—	— (Note: "The Vengeful One" did not enter the Billboard Canadian Hot 100, but peaked at number 35 on the Canadian Rock chart.)	—	—	—	— (Note: "The Vengeful One" did not enter the UK Singles Chart, but peaked at number 1 on the UK Singles Sales Chart.)	RIAA: Platinum; ARIA: Gold; MC: Platinum; RMNZ: Gold	Immortalized
2015	"The Light"	—	—	1	18	—	— (Note: "The Light" did not enter the Billboard Canadian Hot 100, but peaked at number 29 on the Canadian Rock chart.)	—	—	—	—	RIAA: Platinum; ARIA: Gold; MC: Gold	Immortalized
2015	"The Sound of Silence" (Simon & Garfunkel cover)	42	22	1	3	4	40	40	32	17	29	RIAA: 9× Platinum; ARIA: 8× Platinum; IFPI AUT: Platinum; BPI: 3× Platinum; BVMI: Diamond; MC: Diamond; IFPI SWI: Gold; RMNZ: 7× Platinum	Immortalized
2016	"Open Your Eyes"	—	—	1	32	—	—	—	—	—	—		Immortalized
2018	"Are You Ready"	— (Note: "Are You Ready" did not enter the US Billboard Hot 100, but peaked at number 42 on the US Digital Song Sales chart.)	— (Note: "Are You Ready" did not enter the US Billboard Alternative Airplay chart, but peaked at number 5 on the US Alternative Digital Song Sales chart.)	1	12	—	— (Note: "Are You Ready" did not enter the Billboard Canadian Hot 100, but peaked at number 14 on the Canadian Rock chart.)	95	—	—	—	RIAA: Gold; MC: Gold	Evolution
2018	"A Reason to Fight"	—	— (Note: "A Reason to Fight" did not enter the US Billboard Alternative Airplay chart, but peaked at number 16 on the US Alternative Digital Song Sales chart.)	1	24	—	— (Note: "A Reason to Fight" did not enter the Billboard Canadian Hot 100, but peaked at number 31 on the Canadian Rock chart.)	—	—	—	—		Evolution
2019	"No More"	—	—	1	24	—	— (Note: "No More" did not enter the Billboard Canadian Hot 100, but peaked at number 39 on the Canadian Rock chart.)	87	—	—	—		Evolution
"—" denotes a recording that did not chart or was not released in that territory. "×" denotes periods where charts did not exist or were not archived.

=== 2020s ===
Year	Song	Peak chart positions										Certifications	Album
Year	Song	US Dig.	US Main.	US Rock	CAN	FIN	NOR	NZ Hot	RUS Air.	UK	WW	Certifications	Album
2020	"Hold On to Memories"	—	3	46	—	—	—	—	—	—	—		Evolution
2022	"Hey You"	40	1	28	— (Note: "Hey You" did not enter the Billboard Canadian Hot 100, but peaked at number 35 on the Canadian Digital Song Sales chart.)	97	—	33	—	—	—		Divisive
2022	"Bad Man"	—	2	49	— (Note: "Bad Man" did not enter the Billboard Canadian Hot 100, but peaked at number 32 on the Canadian Rock chart.)	—	—	38	—	—	—		Divisive
2023	"Unstoppable"	—	1	—	— (Note: "Unstoppable" did not enter the Billboard Canadian Hot 100, but peaked at number 29 on the Canadian Rock chart.)	67	—	—	—	—	—		Divisive
2023	"Don't Tell Me" (featuring Ann Wilson)	—	2	—	— (Note: "Don't Tell Me" did not enter the Billboard Canadian Hot 100, but peaked at number 37 on the Canadian Rock chart.)	—	—	—	—	—	—		Divisive
2024	"The Sound of Silence" (Cyril remix; Simon & Garfunkel cover)	17	—	—	—	27	17	23	16	47 (Note: Charting as the original version by Disturbed.)	93	ARIA: 2× Platinum; RMNZ: Gold	Non-album single
2025	"Glass Shatters" (New Mix)	—	— (Note: "Glass Shatters - New Mix" did not enter the US Mainstream Rock Songs chart, but peaked at number 24 on the US Hot Hard Rock Songs chart.)	— (Note: "Glass Shatters - New Mix" did not enter the US Hot Rock Songs chart, but peaked at number 7 on the US Hard Rock Digital Songs Sales chart.)	—	—	—	—	—	—	—		The Sickness (25th Anniversary Edition)
2025	"I Will Not Break"	23	1	24	— (Note: "I Will Not Break" did not enter the Canadian Hot 100, but peaked at number 6 on the Canada Mainstream Rock chart.)	—	—	25	—	— (Note: "I Will Not Break" did not enter the UK Singles Chart, but peaked at number 51 on the UK Singles Sales Chart.)	—		Non-album single
"—" denotes a recording that did not chart or was not released in that territory. "×" denotes periods where charts did not exist or were not archived.

=== Promotional singles ===
Year	Title	Chart peaks				Certifications	Album
Year	Title	US Rock	US Rock Digital	US Hard Rock	US Hard Rock Digital	Certifications	Album
2003	"Believe"	—	—	—	—		Believe
2007	"This Moment"	—	—	—	—		Transformers: The Album
2008	"Perfect Insanity"	—	—	—	—		Indestructible
2010	"Asylum"	—	29	—	—		Asylum
2011	"3"	—	—	—	—		The Lost Children
2015	"Immortalized"	36	19	—	5	RIAA: Gold	Immortalized
2015	"What Are You Waiting For"	—	20	—	3		Immortalized
2015	"Fire It Up"	—	—	—	12		Immortalized
2015	"Never Wrong"	—	—	—	—		Immortalized
2018	"The Best Ones Lie"	—	—	—	10		Evolution
2020	"If I Ever Lose My Faith in You" (Sting cover)	—	3	8	1		Non-album single
2022	"Divisive"	—	20	17	5		Divisive
"—" denotes a recording that did not chart or was not released in that territory.

== Videos ==
=== Video albums ===
Title	Video details	Certifications
M.O.L.	Released: June 4, 2002; Label: Warner Bros. (#38548); Formats: DVD, VHS	ARIA: Platinum
Indestructible in Germany (Note: Indestructible in Germany was released exclusively through Best Buy.)	Released: November 27, 2008; Label: Reprise; Format: DVD	
Decade of Disturbed	Released: August 31, 2010; Label: Reprise; Format: DVD	

=== Music videos ===
Year	Song	Album	Director(s)	Type	Ref.
1998	"Perfect Insanity"	M.O.L. / Indestructible	Erika Muller	Narrative	
2000	"Stupify"	The Sickness	Nathan "Karma" Cox	Performance	
2001	"Voices"	The Sickness	Gregory Dark	Narrative	
2001	"Want"	The Sickness	—N/a	Performance	
2001	"Down with the Sickness"	The Sickness	Nathan Cox	Tour footage	
2002	"Prayer"	Believe	Brothers Strause	Narrative	
2003	"Remember"	Believe	Marc Webb	Performance	
2003	"Liberate"	Believe	Nathan Cox / Hank Lena	Live footage	
2005	"Bound"	Believe	Nathan Cox / Hank Lena	Live footage	
2005	"Stricken"	Ten Thousand Fists	Nathan Cox	Performance	
2006	"Land of Confusion"	Ten Thousand Fists	Todd McFarlane / Terry Fitzgerald	Narrative	
2008	"Inside the Fire"	Indestructible	Nathan Cox	Narrative	
2008	"Indestructible"	Indestructible	Noble Jones	Performance	
2009	"The Night"	Indestructible	Noble Jones	Performance	
2010	"Another Way to Die"	Asylum	Roboshobo	Narrative	
2010	"Asylum"	Asylum	Roboshobo	Narrative	
2010	"The Animal"	Asylum	Charlie Terrell	Performance	
2015	"The Vengeful One"	Immortalized	Phil Mucci	Narrative	
2015	"The Light"	Immortalized	Culley Bunker / Craig Bernard	Narrative	
2015	"The Sound of Silence"	Immortalized	Matt Mahurin	Narrative	
2018	"Are You Ready"	Evolution	Robert Schober	Performance	
2018	"A Reason to Fight"	Evolution	Matt Mahurin	Performance	
2019	"No More"	Evolution	Matt Mahurin	Performance	
2020	"Hold On to Memories"	Evolution	Matt Mahurin	Performance	
2020	"If I Ever Lose My Faith in You"	Non-album single	Matt Mahurin	Narrative	
2022	"Hey You"	Divisive	Josiah	Narrative	
2022	"Bad Man"	Divisive	Tristan Holmes	Narrative	
2023	"Unstoppable"	Divisive	Greatwork	Narrative	
2024	"Don't Tell Me"	Divisive	Matt Mahurin	Narrative	
