= The Animal (song) =

Single by Disturbed

from the album Asylum
- Released: October 4, 2010
- Recorded: February–April 2010 at
- Studio: Groovemaster Studios, Chicago
- Genre: Alternative metal
- Length: 4:13 (album version); 3:43 (radio edit)
- Label: Reprise
- Songwriter(s): Dan Donegan; Mike Wengren; David Draiman
- Producer(s): Dan Donegan

Disturbed singles chronology
| "Asylum" (2010) | "The Animal" (2010) | "Warrior" (2011) |

Music video
- "The Animal" on YouTube

"The Animal" is a song by American heavy metal band Disturbed. It was released on October 4, 2010, as the third single from their studio album, Asylum. According to vocalist David Draiman, "The Animal" was heavily inspired by the movie The Wolfman (2010).

== Music video ==
A music video for "The Animal", directed by Charlie Terrell, premiered on 16 November 2010, on MTV2. It was the first music video from the album Asylum to feature all the band members, as "Another Way to Die" did not feature any of them and "Asylum" only featured lead singer David Draiman. The video also features Draiman's then-fiancée and former WWE Diva Lena Yada.

== Charts ==
=== Weekly charts ===
| Chart (2010–2011) | Peak position |
|---|---|
| US Hot Rock & Alternative Songs (Billboard) | 6 |

=== Year-end charts ===
| Chart (2011) | Position |
|---|---|
| US Hot Rock & Alternative Songs (Billboard) | 33 |

== Certifications ==
| Region | Certification | Certified units/sales |
|---|---|---|
| United States (RIAA) | Gold | 500,000^{‡} |
^{‡} Sales+streaming figures based on certification alone.

== Personnel ==
- David Draiman – lead vocals, backing vocals
- Dan Donegan – guitars, electronics
- John Moyer – bass guitar, backing vocals
- Mike Wengren – drums, percussion
