= Another Way to Die (Disturbed song) =

Single by Disturbed

from the album Asylum
- Released: June 14, 2010
- Studio: Groovemaster (Chicago, Illinois)
- Genre: Alternative metal; heavy metal
- Length: 4:13
- Label: Reprise
- Songwriter(s): Dan Donegan; Mike Wengren; David Draiman
- Producer(s): Dan Donegan

Disturbed singles chronology
"The Night" (2009)	"Another Way to Die" (2010)	"Asylum" (2010)

Music video
- "Another Way to Die" on YouTube

"Another Way to Die" is a song by American heavy metal band Disturbed, released as the first single from their fifth studio album, Asylum. Airplay for the single began on the morning of June 14, 2010. That same day, a lyric video was posted by the band on their official YouTube channel and was released as a digital download on June 15, 2010, via iTunes. On August 31, 2010, an excerpt of the song played in a newly released second trailer for the 2011 Mortal Kombat game.

== Lyrical content ==
In an interview with The Pulse of Radio, frontman David Draiman explained how the track contains some very timely subject matter:

Obviously it's referring to the global catastrophe that we know as global warming, and the effects that it continues to have on our planet; our irresponsibility in doing what we do as species, our constant appetite, our constant consumption at all costs. No matter what is destroyed, no matter what is laid to waste. And, certainly, what's happening in the Gulf now is horrific.

== Track listing ==
Digital single

1. "Another Way to Die" – 4:13

CD single

1. "Another Way to Die" – 4:13
2. "Living After Midnight" (Judas Priest cover) – 4:25

The B-side "Living After Midnight" (originally by Judas Priest) is also included on the band's B-side compilation, The Lost Children, along with their cover of "Midlife Crisis" by Faith No More, which was originally recorded for the tribute album Covered, A Revolution in Sound.

== Music video ==
The band shot a music video for the track directed by Robert Schober (also known as Roboshobo) and was released on August 9. It is the first music video since "Land of Confusion" to not feature any of the band members; the video focuses on worldwide events relating with the song, such as pollution and poverty.

== Chart performance ==
In the week ending September 25, 2010, "Another Way to Die" peaked on the U.S. Billboard Rock Songs chart at number one, becoming Disturbed's first single to reach the top spot on the chart.

=== Weekly charts ===
Chart (2010)	Peak position
Canada (Canadian Hot 100)	62
Canada Rock (Billboard)	23
US Billboard Hot 100	81
US Hot Rock & Alternative Songs (Billboard)	1

=== Year-end charts ===
Chart (2010)	Position
US Hot Rock Songs (Billboard)	17

== Certifications ==
Region	Certification	Certified units/sales
United States (RIAA)	Gold	500,000^{‡}
^{‡} Sales+streaming figures based on certification alone.

== Release history ==
Format	Date	Label
US radio	June 14, 2010	Reprise
Digital download (US)	June 15, 2010	Reprise
Digital download (Worldwide)	June 16–23, 2010	Reprise

== Personnel ==
- David Draiman – lead vocals
- Dan Donegan – guitar, electronics
- John Moyer – bass guitar, backing vocals
- Mike Wengren – drums, percussion
