= Live & Indestructible =

EP by Disturbed
- Released: September 30, 2008
- Recorded: May 30, 2008
- Venue: Deep Rock Drive Studios in Las Vegas, Nevada
- Genre: Heavy metal; alternative metal; nu metal
- Length: 16:14
- Label: Reprise

Disturbed chronology
Indestructible (2008)	Live & Indestructible (2008)	Asylum (2010)

Live & Indestructible is an extended play (EP) by American heavy metal band Disturbed. It was released on September 30, 2008 exclusively through iTunes Store and on October 7, 2008 via other online retailers. It features three live tracks from Disturbed's first online concert at Deep Rock Drive and includes the music video for Indestructible's third official single and title track, "Indestructible". The EP was also sold at Hot Topic stores exclusively in CD format, featuring an alternative cover. This version features an extra song, "Stupify", and lacks the music video for "Indestructible".

== Track listing ==
All tracks written and performed by David Draiman, Dan Donegan, Mike Wengren and John Moyer, credited as Disturbed.

=== Digital ===
No.	Title	Length
1.	"Inside the Fire" (Live from Deep Rock Drive)	3:51
2.	"Stricken" (Live from Deep Rock Drive)	4:05
3.	"The Game" (Live from Deep Rock Drive)	3:50
4.	"Indestructible" (Video version; iTunes exclusive)	4:30
Total length:		16:14

=== CD ===
No.	Title	Length
1.	"Inside the Fire"	3:53
2.	"The Game"	3:52
3.	"Stupify"	4:11
4.	"Stricken"	4:06

== Personnel ==
- David Draiman – lead vocals
- Dan Donegan – guitar
- Mike Wengren – drums
- John Moyer – bass, backing vocals
- CJ De Villar – mixing
