= Indestructible in Germany =

Video by Disturbed
- Released: November 27, 2008
- Recorded: June 7, 2008, at Rock am Ring at Nürburgring, Germany
- Genre: Alternative metal, nu metal, hard rock
- Length: 28:00
- Label: Reprise
- Producer: Dan Donegan

Indestructible in Germany is a live DVD by American heavy metal band Disturbed. It contains six live tracks from Disturbed's performance at Rock am Ring at Nürburgring, Germany, recorded on June 7, 2008.

== Track listing ==
All tracks written, arranged and performed by Disturbed.

No.	Title	Length
1.	"Perfect Insanity"	5:03
2.	"Liberate"	3:41
3.	"Stupify"	4:18
4.	"Ten Thousand Fists"	3:34
5.	"The Game"	5:29
6.	"Down with the Sickness"	8:10
Total length:		28:00

== Personnel ==
- David Draiman – lead vocals
- Dan Donegan – guitar
- Mike Wengren – drums
- John Moyer – bass, backing vocals
- Neal Avron – mixing
- Paul Shyvers – director
