= The Night (Disturbed song) =

Single by Disturbed

Single by Disturbed

from the album Indestructible
- Released: March 31, 2009
- Recorded: February 2007 – January 2008 at Groovemaster Studios in Chicago, Illinois
- Genre: Heavy metal
- Length: 4:46
- Label: Reprise
- Songwriter(s): Dan Donegan; Mike Wengren; David Draiman
- Producer(s): Dan Donegan

Disturbed singles chronology
"Indestructible" (2008)	"The Night" (2009)	"Another Way to Die" (2010)

"The Night" is a song by American heavy metal band Disturbed. It was released on 31 March 2009, as the fourth single from their studio album, Indestructible. The song was the first from Indestructible to be completed musically. It is lyrically meant to portray the night as a living entity. Musically, "The Night" is dark and textural. Disturbed guitarist Dan Donegan was almost universally praised for his work on this song, specifically during the guitar solo. A music video to correspond with the song was filmed in January 2009 and later released in late March 2009.

== Recording and production ==
"The Night" was the first song from Indestructible to be completed musically. Disturbed vocalist David Draiman composed the vocal melody line for the song in just three days. Draiman later explained, "The instrumentation was so cool and so dark and textural that I right away kind of jumped into it." This caused Draiman to tentatively call the record The Night.

== Musical style and lyrical themes ==
Vocalist David Draiman said that, lyrically, "The Night" is meant to, "portray the night almost as like a living entity that sets you free. You're enveloped by it, and masked by it." 411mania writer Dan Marsicano claims that, musically, "The Night" is an "epic-sounding track that has one of the best solos that Donegan has ever done and a catchy chorus."

Artistdirect writer Paul Gargano compares "The Night" to American thrash metal band Metallica's fourth album, ...And Justice for All, claiming that Disturbed guitarist Dan Donegan, "[emerges] loud and clearly as a guitar hero for the modern day as the bottom end crushes through the darkness with a conviction that is not only catchy, but comforting."

PopMatters writer Andrew Blackie claims that the song is "one rare moment of spontaneity on Indestructible," because "drums and guitars pummel through conflicting times." Blackie then dismisses this idea, explaining "This ... suggests a climate of turmoil, one that ... fails to materialize here." The guitar solo in "The Night" was almost universally noted, as well.

== Music video ==
The music video corresponding with "The Night" was filmed in January 2009, directed by Nobles Jones, and then released in late March 2009. Jones was inspired by science fiction/horror films such as Alien and The Thing, and the result was "fitting for the track's dark guitar tones and brooding vocal melodies."

The music video takes place in a car garage where Disturbed is performing and vocalist David Draiman is sitting in front of a car, singing. Several times throughout the music video, a dark entity is shown moving behind Draiman, or materializing around other objects. Eventually, a security officer notices via a security camera that the dark entity is materializing around the car, with Draiman no longer there. The officer heads to the car, and investigates it. The band is then shown taking a lift out of the garage, while the officer is still investigating. The dark entity attacks the officer as the band leaves the garage.

== Chart positions ==
Chart (2009)	Position
Hot Mainstream Rock Tracks	2
Hot Modern Rock Tracks	18
Rock Songs	8

== Certifications ==
Region	Certification	Certified units/sales
Canada (Music Canada)	Gold	40,000^{‡}
United States (RIAA)	Gold	500,000^{‡}
^{‡} Sales+streaming figures based on certification alone.

== Personnel ==
- Dan Donegan – guitar, producer, electronics
- David Draiman – lead vocals, backing vocals, co-producer
- Mike Wengren – drums, co-producer
- John Moyer – bass guitar, backing vocals
- Neal Avron – mixing
- David Finch – artwork
