= Just Stop =

Single by Disturbed

from the album Ten Thousand Fists
- Released: February 7, 2006
- Studio: Groovemaster (Chicago, Illinois)
- Length: 3:46
- Label: Reprise
- Songwriters: Dan Donegan; Mike Wengren; David Draiman
- Producer: Johnny K

Disturbed singles chronology
"Stricken" (2005)	"Just Stop" (2006)	"Land of Confusion" (2006)

"Just Stop" is a song by American heavy metal band Disturbed. It was released on February 7, 2006, as the third single from their third studio album, Ten Thousand Fists (2005).

== Track listing ==
All tracks are written by Dan Donegan, Mike Wengren, David Draiman.

No.	Title	Length
1.	"Just Stop (Live at House of Blues – Chicago)"	3:51
2.	"Just Stop"	3:43
3.	"Just Stop (Music Video)"	3:58
Total length:		11:32

== US promo ==
No.	Title	Length
1.	"Just Stop"	3:43

== Charts ==
Chart (2006)	Peak position
US Alternative Airplay (Billboard)	24
US Mainstream Rock (Billboard)	4

== Personnel ==
- David Draiman – lead vocals, backing vocals
- Dan Donegan – guitars, electronics
- John Moyer – bass, backing vocals
- Mike Wengren – drums
