= Guarded =

Promotional single by Disturbed

from the album Ten Thousand Fists
- Released: June 28, 2005
- Studio: Groovemaster (Chicago, Illinois)
- Length: 3:22
- Label: Reprise
- Songwriters: Dan Donegan; Mike Wengren; David Draiman
- Producer: Johnny K

Disturbed singles chronology
"Liberate" (2003)	"Guarded" (2005)	"Stricken" (2005)

"Guarded" is a song by American heavy metal band Disturbed. It was released on June 28, 2005, as a promotional single from their third studio album, Ten Thousand Fists (2005). It was the band's first overall single to feature new bassist John Moyer.

== Lyrical themes ==
According to vocalist David Draiman, "Guarded" is about how his lifestyle forces him to protect himself emotionally. He said, "It's a song that reflects what choosing this life forces certain people to do in a certain way—you have to remain guarded on a certain level."

== Release ==
"Guarded" was released to radio stations as a promotional single on June 28, 2005. Vocalist David Draiman said, "[The song] was put out there to just whet everybody's appetite. It's one of the more aggressive tracks on the record—just to remind everybody where we came from and who we are. Kind of give back to the core a little bit."

== Personnel ==
- David Draiman – vocals
- Dan Donegan – guitars
- John Moyer – bass
- Mike Wengren – drums

== Charts ==
Year	Chart	Position
2005	US Mainstream Rock Tracks	7
2005	US Modern Rock Tracks	28
2005	US Bubbling Under Hot 100	17
