= Ten Thousand Fists (song) =

Single by Disturbed

from the album Ten Thousand Fists
- Released: December 28, 2006
- Studio: Groovemaster (Chicago, Illinois)
- Genre: Nu metal
- Length: 3:33
- Label: Reprise
- Songwriters: Dan Donegan; Mike Wengren; David Draiman
- Producer: Johnny K

Disturbed singles chronology
"Land of Confusion" (2006)	"Ten Thousand Fists" (2006)	"Inside the Fire" (2008)

"Ten Thousand Fists" is a song by American heavy metal band Disturbed. It was released on December 28, 2006, as the fifth and final single from their third studio album, Ten Thousand Fists (2005).

== Themes ==
According to Disturbed's vocalist David Draiman, the song "signifies strength, unity, conviction, power, and the exhilaration that you feel when you get to see that at one of our shows. It's one of my favorite moments, and people know that I have an affinity for asking people to put their fists in the air, and it's just, it's exhilaration to be able to see ten thousand raised fists or more."

== Personnel ==
- David Draiman – vocals
- Dan Donegan – guitars, electronics
- John Moyer – bass
- Mike Wengren – drums

== In other media ==
The song was featured in the PlayStation 2, GameCube, and Xbox version of Madden NFL 06.

== Charts ==
Chart (2007)	Peak position
US Mainstream Rock Tracks (Billboard)	7
US Modern Rock Tracks (Billboard)	37

== Certifications ==
Region	Certification	Certified units/sales
Australia (ARIA)	Gold	35,000^{‡}
Canada (Music Canada)	Platinum	80,000^{‡}
New Zealand (RMNZ)	Gold	15,000^{‡}
United States (RIAA)	Platinum	1,000,000^{‡}
^{‡} Sales+streaming figures based on certification alone.
