= Warrior (Disturbed song) =

Single by Disturbed

from the album Asylum
- Released: March 3, 2011
- Recorded: February–April 2010 at Groovemaster Studios in Chicago, Illinois
- Genre: Heavy metal; alternative metal
- Length: 3:25
- Label: Reprise
- Songwriters: Dan Donegan; Mike Wengren; David Draiman
- Producer: Dan Donegan

Disturbed singles chronology
"The Animal" (2010)	"Warrior" (2011)	"Hell" (2011)

"Warrior" is a song by American heavy metal band Disturbed. It was released on 3 March 2011, as the fourth single from their album, Asylum.

== Background ==
The song was featured on Disturbed's Asylum Interactive Game, used to promote the album. Before being released as a single, "Warrior" peaked at number three on the Billboard Bubbling Under Hot 100.

== Music video ==
A newly announced music video was directed by Chris Marrs Piliero, however, Disturbed's frontman David Draiman stated on his Twitter page that the video was canceled.

== Charts ==
=== Weekly charts ===
Chart (2010–11)	Peak position
US Bubbling Under Hot 100 (Billboard)	3
US Digital Song Sales (Billboard)	56
US Hot Rock & Alternative Songs (Billboard)	14

=== Year-end charts ===
Chart (2011)	Position
US Hot Rock Songs (Billboard)	50

== Certifications ==
Region	Certification	Certified units/sales
Canada (Music Canada)	Gold	40,000^{‡}
United States (RIAA)	Gold	500,000^{‡}
^{‡} Sales+streaming figures based on certification alone.
