= The Lost Children (album) =

- The cover of The Lost Children, featuring The Guy, Disturbed's mascot

Compilation album by Disturbed
- Released: November 8, 2011
- Recorded: 1999–2010
- Genres: Heavy metal; alternative metal; nu metal; hard rock
- Length: 60:52
- Label: Reprise
- Producers: Disturbed; Johnny K

Disturbed chronology
Asylum (2010)	The Lost Children (2011)	Immortalized (2015)

Singles from The Lost Children
- 1. "3" Released: April 28, 2011; 2. "Hell" Released: October 11, 2011

The Lost Children is a B-sides compilation album by American heavy metal band Disturbed. It was released on November 8, 2011. The album was announced in August 2011 by David Draiman via Twitter, where he answered several questions regarding the album.

== Background ==
The title comes from the band calling the songs "their children", because they can't pick a favorite. The Lost Children features all of Disturbed's B-side tracks that were recorded during a time period of 11 years with the exception of the song "Glass Shatters" which is only available on WWF Forceable Entry. The only song on the album not previously available is "Mine". A track titled "3", which was originally released as a digital single on the band's website for a campaign backing the West Memphis Three, was not originally intended to be released on the album. However, it was included due to a surprise hearing for the West Memphis Three; the hearing resulted in their release from prison. The album artwork was revealed on September 22, 2011. "Hell" was announced as the first radio single for the album.

== Songs ==
According to David Draiman, the album's first single, "Hell", is "about a relationship with someone who keeps coming in and out of your life, and every time they come back they fuck up your whole world." The track "Mine" is about religion as a catalyst for war.

== Critical reception ==
Professional ratings
Review scores
Source	Rating
AllMusic	3.5/5 stars
Artistdirect	4/5 stars
Blabbermouth.net	7/10
Revolver	4/5 stars
Sputnikmusic	3/5

The first online review of The Lost Children was posted by the website Artistdirect, and Rick Florino had given the album a positive review. Florino states about the album, "One of the reasons why Disturbed stood out from the turn of the century pack is because they've always been as diverse as they are dangerous in their approach. The band wasn't afraid to take risks, while crafting pulse-pounding, arena-filling heavy metal. The Lost Children screams that loud and clear." Revolver also reviewed the album and gave it a 4 out of 5, saying "Granted, it is a collection of B-sides, but any lack of overall cohesiveness or structure makes this album an enjoyably random pile of 16 good-to-great songs that force the listener to pick through and find their favorite."

== Commercial performance ==
In the United States, the album debuted at No. 13 on the Billboard 200 chart with 43,000 copies sold, according to Nielsen SoundScan. The album has sold 238,000 copies in the United States as of July 2015.

== Track listing ==
All tracks written by Dan Donegan, Mike Wengren, and David Draiman, except where noted

No.	Title	Writer(s)	Originally from	Length
1.	"Hell"		2005 ~ B-side of "Stricken" (UK single) from Ten Thousand Fists	4:15
2.	"A Welcome Burden"	Steve Kmak, Donegan, Wengren, Draiman	2000 ~ Track from Dracula 2000: Music from the Dimension Motion Picture	3:31
3.	"This Moment"		2007 ~ Track from Transformers: The Album	3:05
4.	"Old Friend"		Unreleased track from Asylum	3:34
5.	"Monster"		2005 ~ Bonus track from Ten Thousand Fists iTunes Deluxe version	4:04
6.	"Run"		2008 ~ Bonus track from Indestructible Limited edition	3:13
7.	"Leave It Alone"		2010 ~ Bonus track from Asylum Deluxe and Japanese editions	4:07
8.	"Two Worlds"		2006 ~ Bonus from Ten Thousand Fists Tour Editions	3:33
9.	"God of the Mind"	Kmak, Donegan, Wengren, Draiman	2001 ~ Track from Valentine	3:05
10.	"Sickened"		2006 ~ B-side of "Land of Confusion" from Ten Thousand Fists	4:00
11.	"Mine"		Unreleased track from Asylum	5:04
12.	"Parasite"		2008 ~ Bonus track from Indestructible Japanese pressings	3:25
13.	"Dehumanized"	Kmak, Donegan, Wengren, Draiman	2005 ~ B-side of "Stricken" (US single) from Ten Thousand Fists	3:32
14.	"3"		2011 ~ Digital single to benefit the West Memphis Three	4:02
15.	"Midlife Crisis" (Faith No More cover)	Mike Patton, Roddy Bottum, Mike Bordin, Billy Gould	2008 ~ Track from Covered, A Revolution in Sound	4:04
16.	"Living After Midnight" (Judas Priest cover)	Rob Halford, K. K. Downing, Glenn Tipton	2010 ~ Track from The Metal Forge Volume One: A Tribute To Judas Priest	4:25
Total length:				60:52

- "Hell" was originally released as a B-side to the "Stricken" UK single off of Ten Thousand Fists, July 25, 2005.
- "A Welcome Burden", recorded during The Sickness sessions, was originally released on Dracula 2000: Music from the Dimension Motion Picture on December 12, 2000, and later released on The Sickness: 10th Anniversary Edition, March 23, 2010.
- "This Moment" was originally released as a track from Transformers: The Album, June 26, 2007.
- "Old Friend" and "Mine" were previously unreleased tracks from the Asylum sessions.
- "Monster" was originally released as a bonus track to the Ten Thousand Fists iTunes Deluxe version, September 20, 2005.
- "Run" was originally released as a bonus track from Indestructible Limited edition, June 3, 2008.
- "Leave It Alone" was originally released as a bonus track from Asylum, both as a Deluxe Edition track and in Japanese pressings.
- "Two Worlds" was originally released as a bonus track to the Ten Thousand Fists tour edition, September 2006.
- "God of the Mind" was originally released as a track from Valentine soundtrack, January 30, 2001, and later released as a bonus track on the 2002 reissue of The Sickness, May 29, 2002.
- "Sickened" was originally release as a B-side to the "Land of Confusion" single off of Ten Thousand Fists, October 2, 2006.
- "Parasite" was originally released as a bonus track from Indestructible Japanese pressings, June 3, 2008.
- "Dehumanized", recorded during the Believe sessions, was originally released a B-side to the "Stricken" UK single off of Ten Thousand Fists, July 25, 2005. A live version appeared earlier on the Music as a Weapon II live album, February 24, 2004.
- "3", recorded during the Asylum sessions, was originally released as a digital download, April 28, 2011.
- "Midlife Crisis", recorded during the Indestructible sessions, was originally released as a track from Covered, A Revolution in Sound, March 10, 2009.
- "Living After Midnight" was originally released as a track The Metal Forge Volume One: A Tribute To Judas Priest by Metal Hammer UK music magazine on May 4, 2010, and later released as a B-side to the "Another Way to Die" single off of Asylum, June 14, 2010.

== Personnel ==
Disturbed

- David Draiman – lead vocals
- Dan Donegan – guitar, keyboards
- John Moyer – bass, backing vocals
- Mike Wengren – drums, percussion
- Steve Kmak – bass (tracks: 2, 9, 13)

Production

- Johnny K – producer (tracks: 1–3, 5, 8–10, and 13), mixing (track 16)
- Disturbed – producers (tracks: 1–3, 5, 8–10, and 13)
- Dan Donegan – producer (tracks: 4, 6, 7, 11, 12, and 14–16)
- David Draiman – producer (tracks: 4, 6, 7, 11, 12, and 14–16)
- Mike Wengren – producer (tracks: 4, 6, 7, 11, 12, and 14–16)
- Ben Grosse – mixing (tracks: 1, 3, 5, 8, 10, and 13)
- Neal Avron – mixing (tracks: 2, 4, 6, 7, 9, 11, 12, 14, and 15)
- Ted Jensen – mastering
- Travis Shinn – photography
- Raymond Swanland – illustration
- Denny Phillips – design
- Frank Maddocks – creative direction
- Norman Wonderly – creative direction

== Chart positions ==
Chart (2011)	Peak position
Australian Albums Chart	12
Austrian Albums Chart	35
German Albums Chart	29
New Zealand Albums Chart	10
Scottish Albums	88
Swedish Albums Chart	59
Swiss Albums Chart	59
UK Albums Chart	85
US Billboard 200	13
