= Asylum (Disturbed album) =

- The cover art of Asylum featuring Disturbed's mascot, The Guy

Studio album by Disturbed
- Released: August 31, 2010
- Recorded: February 8 – April 20, 2010
- Studio: Groovemaster Studios in Chicago, Illinois
- Genres: Heavy metal; alternative metal; hard rock
- Length: 52:54
- Label: Reprise
- Producers: Dan Donegan; David Draiman; Mike Wengren

Disturbed chronology
Live & Indestructible (2008)	Asylum (2010)	The Lost Children (2011)

Singles from Asylum
- 1. "Another Way to Die" Released: June 14, 2010; 2. "Asylum" Released: July 19, 2010 (radio); 3. "The Animal" Released: October 4, 2010; 4. "Warrior" Released: March 3, 2011

Asylum is the fifth studio album by American heavy metal band Disturbed. It was released on August 31, 2010, in the United States through Reprise Records. The album is meant to take a fresh direction in the band's music career, while remaining consistent with the band's previous albums. Most of the lyrical content was inspired by aspects of frontman David Draiman's life prior to making the album. Asylum is also the third consecutive Disturbed album to not feature the Parental Advisory label (although the deluxe version on iTunes is marked explicit for live versions of their earlier material from The Sickness). A tour in support of the album, titled the Asylum Tour, started in late August 2010.

Asylum debuted at number one on the Billboard 200 chart with sales of approximately 179,000 according to Nielsen Soundscan. This is the fourth consecutive number one album in the U.S. for Disturbed. The other two bands ever to accomplish this feat in the Soundscan era are metal band Metallica and folk rock/jam band Dave Matthews Band. On March 31, 2011, Asylum was certified Gold by the Recording Industry Association of America (RIAA).

== Development and recording ==
In a November 2008 interview, David Draiman stated that their album would be lyrically as dark as their previous album, Indestructible, if not darker. In an earlier interview with Mike Wengren and John Moyer, it was stated that, judging by Draiman's feelings on the last few years of his life, the album would be aggressive, angry, and "hard-hitting," but similar musically to their album Believe.

In a July 2009 interview with FaceCulture, Draiman said "A couple of [song riffs] that Danny has come up with are really amazing. But they're just little pieces...it's not even in two-three part progression [yet]." It was later confirmed that the title of the album would be Asylum.

Songwriting for the album began in late 2009. On February 8, 2010, it was announced that the band had entered the studio in Chicago, Illinois to begin recording their fifth album. Guitarist Dan Donegan stated that the band had written around 15 to 18 songs, and 17 were recorded. On April 20, 2010, roughly two months after they entered the studio, Disturbed announced that they had finished recording the album, and were ready to begin mixing the album in Los Angeles, California. As they did with their last album Indestructible, Disturbed stated that they self-produced Asylum.

== Style and lyrical themes ==
Asylum, musically, showcases a much heavier sound opposed to their past couple of albums. The band's vocalist David Draiman stated in an earlier interview that he wanted Asylum to be a darker album, lyrically, than Indestructible, and mature themes for the album were inspired by several events that took place during Draiman's life in recent years. Draiman described the album as "still identifiably Disturbed, but showing more maturation. We feel this is one of the strongest bodies of work we've ever put together. It definitely goes in familiar areas, but with new levels of precision and skill." Lyrically, Draiman says, "the themes range from very personal and introspective, to the political and provocative." In an interview with Music Vice, Dan Donegan says, "We're definitely not trying to wave the flag here, all we're doing is trying to build a little bit of awareness. If it makes you think about it for a minute and change some of the small things in your life then that's good too."

The album's first official single, titled "Another Way to Die", is about the acknowledgment of global warming. The title track has a dual meaning, with the concept of a person losing a loved one as both an asylum driving the person insane, as well as a place of comfort. The first song on the album, titled "Remnants", is an instrumental which originally was meant to be combined with the song "Asylum" to make a 7:30-long track, but instead it was split into two parts for setting the mood of the album, and for possible appearances on the radio. "Serpentine" is a song intended to be "ethereal and frightening", about a demonic woman who "utilizes her sexuality to prey on the weaknesses of men." In the same interview, Draiman pointed out the technical aspects of some songs that include vocals from himself, as well as Wengren, Donegan, and Moyer all at the same time, creating an interplay Draiman described as "gang vocals". Draiman concluded the interview by likening the album as a whole to the film Gladiator for its "moments of loss, the moments of triumph... struggle... mysticism." "The Animal" is reported to be about an individual turning into a werewolf from the light of the full moon, taking inspiration from the 2010 remake film The Wolfman. "The Infection" is another relationship song Draiman wrote, talking about the depression a person feels after a break-up, and treating it as if it were an infection, something that is "eating away inside them." The song was described as having a fast guitar riff with melodic vocals and the solo section was described as having an orchestrated feel to it.

"Crucified" is a song about a relationship of Draiman's that fell apart and the "desperation it brings you to". A B-side titled "Old Friend" is about the main character of the television show Dexter (based on the novel Darkly Dreaming Dexter) and how he has no emotions, calling upon his dark side known as "The Dark Passenger" and how it teaches him "The Code", a way to channel his violent urges towards people who deserve death, stating how death is just an "old friend" of his. The song "Never Again" is about the Nazi Holocaust of World War II. The song "My Child" is about Draiman getting a girlfriend pregnant, and how he readied himself mentally for the child, but his girlfriend miscarried and lost the child in the first trimester. A song called "Innocence" talks about "corrupt attorneys and the criminals that they choose to defend." The song "Sacrifice" speaks about how people seem to have two sides to their personality, a light and a dark side, taking inspiration from Strange Case of Dr Jekyll and Mr Hyde.

Two other B-sides for the album were talked about. In the July 2010 issue of Metal Hammer Magazine, Donegan talked about the B-side "3": "There's also a song about the West Memphis Three...these kids that came from this Bible Belt town and just because they wore black and listened to heavy metal they were found guilty of murder, even though there was no evidence!" Another B-side was mentioned, titled "Mine", a song about religion as a catalyst for war.

== Promotion and release ==
On July 15, Disturbed released a free download of the song "Asylum" on their official website. On July 19, the song "Asylum" was released in the United States via the iTunes Store. They have also announced an iTunes deluxe version of the album which included a code to download Decade of Disturbed online for free, and five bonus tracks, "Leave It Alone", live performances of "Down with the Sickness" and "Stricken" and two videos of guitarist Dan Donegan showing how to play the main riffs for the band's first two singles, "Down with the Sickness" and "Stupify" both of which were titled "Dissected" instead of "Disturbed". A hidden track titled "ISHFWILF", which is a cover of U2's song "I Still Haven't Found What I'm Looking For", is available on all versions of the album. The band also released a limited-edition version of Asylum, featuring the Decade of Disturbed DVD and bonus tracks on the CD (live performances of "Down with the Sickness" and "Stricken").

The songs "Asylum", "Another Way to Die" and "The Animal" were released as downloadable content for the video game Rock Band on August 24, seven days before the album's release date. The song "Asylum" has the album's opening track, titled "Remnants", attached to it in the game.

On August 16, 2010, the music video for "Asylum" was released on the band's official website and MySpace page. On August 24, the track "Never Again" was available for download on the band's official website, after the band announced the song's release on their Twitter page. The third music video was for "The Animal", and was released on November 16, 2010. A short, forty-second trailer for this video was displayed on the band's official website 4 days before its release.

Disturbed toured in support of Asylum as a headlining act in the Uproar Festival, along with Stone Sour, Hellyeah, and Avenged Sevenfold. The first show of the tour took place in Minneapolis, Minnesota at the Target Center on August 17, with the last show played in Madison, Wisconsin, at the Alliant Energy Center Memorial Coliseum on October 4, 2010.

As a Hot Topic exclusive, those who purchased the CD there also received an "Asylum" wristband, similar to a real one from a real psychiatric ward. The wristband includes a false bar code, a DOB (which is 8/31/10, the album's release date), along with the word Disturbed and a website for the album (DisturbedAsylum.com), as well as a specific unique number for each wristband with an amalgamation of two letters and six numbers.

On March 3, 2011, it was announced that the band had filmed a music video for the song "Warrior"; however, David Draiman stated on his Twitter page that the video was cancelled.

== Reception ==
Professional ratings
Aggregate scores
Source	Rating
Metacritic	70/100
Review scores
Source	Rating
AllMusic	4/5 stars
About.com	3/5 stars
Billboard	4/5 stars
Blabbermouth	6.5/10
Classic Rock	3/5 stars
Entertainment Weekly	B−
Kerrang!	3/5 stars
Rock Sound	7/10
Rolling Stone	3/5 stars
PopMatters	7/10

Asylum received positive reviews from music critics, averaging a score of 70 on the review aggregate website Metacritic and is the best reviewed album by Disturbed from critics. James Zahn of Kick-Axe gave the album a 4 out of 5, summarizing his review by stating "Admittedly, I've long respected Disturbed as a band, while not considering myself 'a fan.' Asylum has changed that." Also, giving the album a positive review, Merlin Alderslade of Rock Sound stated "Asylum won't set the world alight, but it's certainly not monotonous enough to send anyone to the madhouse." Gary Graff of Billboard gave Asylum a short and positive review ending with "There are enough brains and brawn to make this an 'Asylum' any head-banger would be crazy to avoid."

Damon Harrison of Rinse Review Repeat said of the band and Asylum that "Disturbed have hit a nail with their hammering aesthetics, finally, and build an aggressive foundation that's sure to leave both fans and critics alike standing firm in their territory." Chris Colgan of PopMatters compared Asylum to Disturbed's previous efforts, remarking how well-balanced it is by comparison. He said, "If Ten Thousand Fists is the large tiger of Disturbed's discography, oversized with more muscle than necessary, and Indestructible is the lean jaguar, fine-cut to just the foundation and essentials, then Asylum is the lion, king of the jungle, perfectly balanced in both core strength and added power to create the purest musical engine for emotional expression."

Ben Czajkowski of 411mania stated about the album, "After five albums, Disturbed has perfected their sound; they might have even become a bit more hard rock than before. Sadly, though, all of the humor that made me fall in love with the band is gone. Replacing it is the darkness of the world, sounds about death, corruption, and depression that come across as a bit uninspired, even though it has perplexed [David] Draiman for the last few years."

Vinnie Paul, former drummer of Pantera and Hellyeah reviewed Asylum in four words, stating, "That thing kicks ass."

On the day of its release, Asylum (Deluxe Edition) topped the iTunes Top Albums and Top Rock Albums chart, and the regular edition of the album ranked No. 2 on the same charts.

== Track listing ==
All tracks are written by Disturbed, except where noted.

No.	Title	Length
1.	"Remnants" (Prelude)	2:43
2.	"Asylum"	4:36
3.	"The Infection"	4:08
4.	"Warrior"	3:24
5.	"Another Way to Die"	4:13
6.	"Never Again"	3:33
7.	"The Animal"	4:13
8.	"Crucified"	4:37
9.	"Serpentine"	4:09
10.	"My Child"	3:18
11.	"Sacrifice"	4:00
12.	"Innocence"	4:31
13.	"ISHFWILF (I Still Haven't Found What I'm Looking For)" (hidden track) (U2 cover; 1:34 silence to begin track – actual time 3:49)	5:28
Total length:		52:53

Deluxe
No.	Title	Length
14.	"Leave It Alone" (Japanese edition bonus track)	4:08
15.	"Down with the Sickness" (Live)	5:55
16.	"Stricken" (Live)	4:17
17.	"Living After Midnight" (Judas Priest cover)	4:25
Total length:		71:35

iTunes deluxe
No.	Title	Length
14.	"Leave It Alone" (Japanese edition bonus track)	4:06
15.	"Down with the Sickness" (Live)	5:54
16.	"Stricken" (Live)	4:16
17.	"Dissected / Down with the Sickness"	2:07
18.	"Dissected / Stupify"	1:45
Total length:		70:54

Spotify edition bonus track
No.	Title	Length
19.	"Old Friend"	3:32
Total length:		74:26

== Personnel ==
Disturbed

- David Draiman – lead vocals
- Dan Donegan – guitars, electronics
- John Moyer – bass, backing vocals
- Mike Wengren – drums, percussion

Production

- Dan Donegan – production
- David Draiman – production
- Mike Wengren – production
- Neal Avron – mixing
- Nicolas Fournier – mixing
- Jeremy Parker – engineering
- Ted Jensen – mastering
- Raymond Swanland – illustrations
- Donny Phillips – art direction and design
- Ellen Wakayama – art direction
- Travis Shinn – photography

== Charts ==
=== Weekly charts ===
Chart (2010)	Peak position
Australian Albums (ARIA)	2
Austrian Albums (Ö3 Austria)	3
Belgian Albums (Ultratop Flanders)	21
Belgian Albums (Ultratop Wallonia)	31
Canadian Albums (Billboard)	2
Danish Albums (Hitlisten)	8
Dutch Albums (Album Top 100)	22
European Top 100 Albums	7
Finnish Albums (Suomen virallinen lista)	2
German Albums (Offizielle Top 100)	4
Greek Albums (IFPI)	10
Irish Albums (IRMA)	16
Italian Albums (FIMI)	57
Japanese Albums (Oricon)	46
New Zealand Albums (RMNZ)	1
Norwegian Albums (VG-lista)	17
Scottish Albums (Official Charts)	11
Spanish Albums (Promusicae)	56
Swedish Albums (Sverigetopplistan)	7
Swiss Albums (Schweizer Hitparade)	14
UK Albums (Official Charts)	7
US Billboard 200	1
US Top Alternative Albums (Billboard)	1
US Top Hard Rock Albums (Billboard)	1
US Top Rock Albums (Billboard)	1

=== Year-end charts ===
Chart (2010)	Position
Australian Albums (ARIA)	58
Canadian Albums (Billboard)	48
New Zealand Albums (RMNZ)	27
US Billboard 200	81
US Top Rock Albums (Billboard)	18

== Certifications ==
Region	Certification	Certified units/sales
Australia (ARIA)	Platinum	70,000^{‡}
Canada (Music Canada)	2× Platinum	160,000^{‡}
New Zealand (RMNZ)	Platinum	15,000^{‡}
United Kingdom (BPI)	Gold	100,000^{‡}
United States (RIAA)	Gold	500,000^{^}
^{^} Shipments figures based on certification alone.^{‡} Sales+streaming figures based on certification alone.

== Release history ==
Region	Date	Distributing label	Format	Catalog
Australia	August 27, 2010	Warner Music Australia	CD and music download services	
Germany	August 27, 2010	Warner	CD and music download services	
United Kingdom	August 30, 2010	Reprise	CD and music download services	
Europe	August 31, 2010	Reprise	CD and music download services	
United States	August 31, 2010	Reprise	CD and music download services	
