= Hell (Disturbed song) =

Single by Disturbed

from the album The Lost Children
- Released: October 4, 2011 (digital) October 11, 2011 (radio)
- Recorded: January – April 2005 at Groovemaster Studios in Chicago, Illinois
- Genre: Heavy metal; alternative metal; hard rock
- Length: 4:14
- Label: Reprise
- Songwriters: Dan Donegan; Mike Wengren; David Draiman
- Producer: Johnny K

Disturbed singles chronology
"Warrior" (2011)	"Hell" (2011)	"The Vengeful One" (2015)

"Hell" is a single by American heavy metal band Disturbed from their compilation album, The Lost Children. The song was originally released as a B-side on the single "Stricken" (2005). As a single in its own right, the song hit radio stations on October 11, 2011. Disturbed's frontman David Draiman stated on his Twitter page that there is no video shoot for the single. An audio-only recording is available on YouTube.

According to David Draiman, "Hell" is "about a relationship with someone who keeps coming in and out of your life, and every time they come back they fuck up your whole world."

== Charts ==
Chart (2011–12)	Peak position
US Rock Songs (Billboard)	35
