= Liberate (Disturbed song) =

Single by Disturbed

from the album Believe
- Released: February 18, 2003
- Studio: Groovemaster Studios in Chicago, Illinois
- Length: 3:30
- Label: Reprise
- Songwriters: Steve Kmak; Dan Donegan; Mike Wengren; David Draiman
- Producer: Johnny K

Disturbed singles chronology
"Remember" (2002)	"Liberate" (2003)	"Guarded" (2005)

"Liberate" is a song by the American heavy metal band Disturbed. The song was released as the third and last single from their second studio album, Believe.

The single peaked at number 21 on the Bubbling Under Hot 100 Singles chart, number 4 in the Mainstream Rock Tracks chart and number 22 in the Modern Rock Tracks chart.

== Chart performance ==
Year	Chart	Position
2003	US Bubbling Under Hot 100 Singles	21
2003	US Mainstream Rock Tracks	4
2003	US Modern Rock Tracks	22

== Personnel ==
- David Draiman – lead vocals, backing vocals
- Dan Donegan – guitar
- Steve Kmak – bass guitar
- Mike Wengren – drums

== See also ==
- Isaiah 1
- Isaiah 2
