= Stricken (song) =

Single by Disturbed

from the album Ten Thousand Fists
- Released: July 25, 2005
- Studio: Groovemaster Studios in Chicago
- Genre: Alternative metal; nu metal
- Length: 4:07
- Label: Reprise
- Songwriters: Dan Donegan; Mike Wengren; David Draiman
- Producer: Johnny K

Disturbed singles chronology
"Guarded" (2005)	"Stricken" (2005)	"Just Stop" (2006)

Music video
- "Stricken" on YouTube

"Stricken" is a song by the American heavy metal band Disturbed. The song was released on July 25, 2005, as the second single from their third studio album, Ten Thousand Fists. The song was certified 3× platinum in the United States by the RIAA on March 6, 2025, for selling 3,000,000 copies. The single is also certified 2× platinum in Canada, platinum in both Australia and New Zealand, and silver in the United Kingdom. It is one of the first of Disturbed's songs to include a guitar solo.

The musical video for the song was filmed in an abandoned hospital in which some scenes from the 1984 horror film A Nightmare on Elm Street were filmed. "Stricken" was used as official theme for WWE's PPV New Year's Revolution, in 2006.

== Music video ==
The video for "Stricken" takes place in an abandoned asylum. There are two women in the video. A man has an affair with both of them. As a result, the man's original girlfriend is shown upset and screaming. The other woman is shown having sexual intercourse with the man. The man, on the other hand, does not show emotion to the very end, with hands on his face. All the while, Disturbed is shown playing, in the background, and random objects are either dropped or thrown.

== Track listing ==
=== CD 1 ===
1. "Stricken" – 4:07
2. "Hell" – 4:14
3. "Darkness" (Live from Music as a Weapon II) – 4:02

=== CD 2 ===
1. "Stricken" – 4:07
2. "Dehumanized" – 3:31

=== 7" vinyl ===
1. "Stricken" – 4:07
2. "Dehumanized" – 3:31

=== German promo ===
1. "Stricken" – 4:06

=== US promo ===
1. "Stricken" (album version) – 4:05

The first B-side, "Hell", is also a bonus track on Ten Thousand Fists. The second B-side, "Dehumanized", was recorded during the recording of Believe. Both songs are also included on the B-side compilation, The Lost Children.

== Chart positions ==
Year	Chart	Position
2006	US Billboard Hot 100	95
2006	Mainstream Rock Tracks	2
2006	Modern Rock Tracks	13
2006	Pop 100	89

== Certifications ==
Region	Certification	Certified units/sales
Australia (ARIA)	Platinum	70,000^{‡}
Canada (Music Canada)	2× Platinum	160,000^{‡}
Denmark (IFPI Danmark)	Gold	45,000^{‡}
New Zealand (RMNZ)	Platinum	30,000^{‡}
United Kingdom (BPI)	Silver	200,000^{‡}
United States (RIAA)	3× Platinum	3,000,000^{‡}
^{‡} Sales+streaming figures based on certification alone.

== Personnel ==
- David Draiman – vocals
- Dan Donegan – guitars, electronics
- John Moyer – bass
- Mike Wengren – drums

Production

- Johnny K – producer
- Ben Grosse – mixing
- Ted Jensen – mastering

== Covers ==
"Stricken" is covered in a more melodic, softer style by David Draiman's brother, Ben Draiman in Ben's EP entitled, The Past Is Not Far Behind.
