= Stereo Satellite =

American rock band

Stereo Satellite is an American rock band featuring guitarist Mike Orlando and Jordan Cannata of Adrenaline Mob, former Rock Star Supernova singer Lukas Rossi, and Disturbed bassist John Moyer. The band was formed in 2017.

Their first single is called Glass Houses, released in 2017 which also includes a video.

== Singles ==
- 2017 - "Glass Houses"
