= Kustom Amplification =

American amplifier manufacturer

- Company type: Private
- Industry: Amplification
- Founded: Chanute, Kansas (1964; 62 years ago)
- Founder: Charles A. "Bud" Ross
- Headquarters: Hebron, Kentucky, United States
- Products: guitar amplifiers
- Parent: Hanser Music Group
- Website: kustom.com

Kustom Amplification or Kustom Electronics is a manufacturer of guitar and bass amplifiers and PA equipment and accessories.

== History ==
"Kustom" was a brand and trademark of Ross, a company founded in 1964 by Charles A. "Bud" Ross (May 31, 1940 to March 10, 2018) in Chanute, Kansas.

== Gallery ==
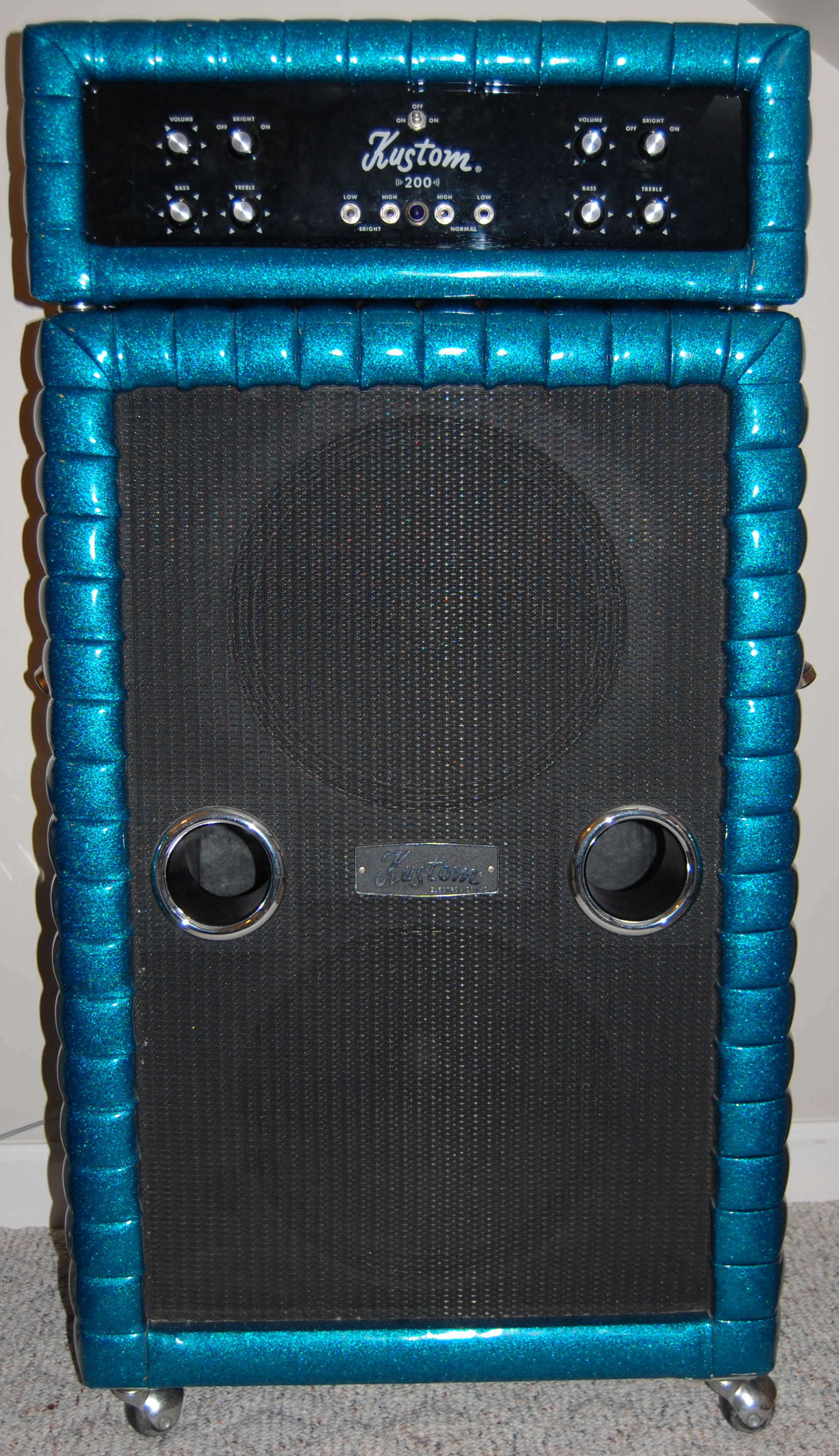
Kustom 200 Bass Amplifier, 100 watts RMS, two 15" speakers, cascade sparkle, 1971

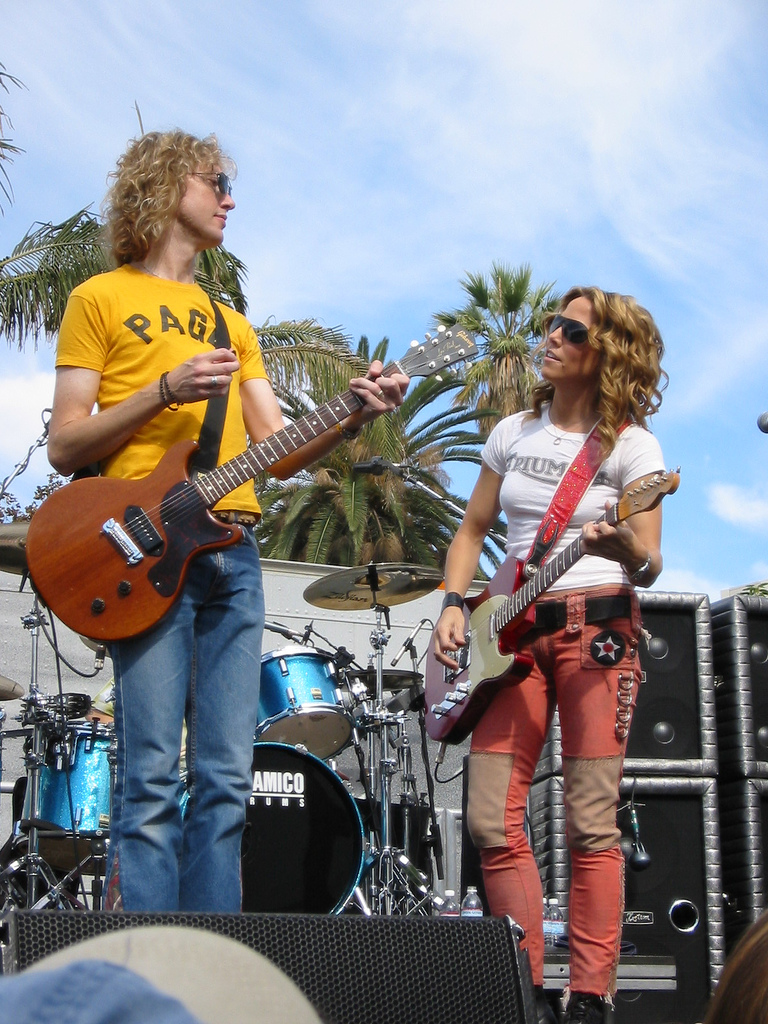
Sheryl Crow (right) with Kustom amps
