= Land of Confusion =

1986 single by Genesis

- Original single cover parodying 1963's With the Beatles

Single by Genesis

from the album Invisible Touch
- B-side: "Feeding the Fire"
- Released: 10 November 1986 (UK)
- Genre: Pop rock; progressive rock
- Length: 4:45 (LP and 7-inch version); 6:55 (12-inch version)
- Label: Virgin (UK); Atlantic (US)
- Songwriters: Mike Rutherford; Tony Banks; Phil Collins
- Lyricist: Mike Rutherford
- Producers: Genesis; Hugh Padgham

Genesis singles chronology
"In Too Deep" (1986)	"Land of Confusion" (1986)	"Tonight, Tonight, Tonight" (1987)

Audio sample
- file; help

"Land of Confusion" is a song by the English rock band Genesis from their thirteenth studio album, Invisible Touch (1986). The music was written by the band, while the lyrics were written by guitarist Mike Rutherford. The song was the third track on the album and the third single, released in October 1986 in the US, where it reached No. 4 in January 1987. The single was released in November 1986 in the United Kingdom, reaching No. 14. It also reached the top 10 in several other countries including Canada, Ireland, West Germany and the Netherlands. The song's video features puppets from the 1980s UK sketch show Spitting Image.

== Critical reception ==
Billboard said it has an "anxious beat" and a "tentatively hopeful lyric." Cashbox called it a "biting and aggressive cut" highlighted by "a tough electronic rhythm and Phil Collins' searching vocal."

== Music video ==
The band members (Banks, Collins and Rutherford) as they appeared in the video

The song's music video had heavy airplay on MTV. The video features caricature puppets by the British television show Spitting Image. After Phil Collins saw a caricatured version of himself on the show, he commissioned the show's creators, Peter Fluck and Roger Law, to create puppets of the entire band, as well as all the characters in the video.

The video opens with a caricatured Ronald Reagan (voiced by Chris Barrie), Nancy Reagan, and a chimpanzee (a reference to the 1951 movie Bedtime for Bonzo which starred Reagan), going to bed at 4:30 p.m. Nancy is absorbed in reading His Way, Kitty Kelley's unauthorised biography of Frank Sinatra. Reagan, holding a teddy bear, kisses the chimp goodnight, falls asleep and begins to have a nightmare, which sets the premise for the entire video. The video intermittently features a line of feet in combat boots marching through a swamp past the heads of Cold War–era political figures including François Mitterrand, Margaret Thatcher, Ferdinand Marcos, and Henry Kissinger.

Caricatured versions of the band members are shown playing instruments on stage during a concert: Tony Banks on an array of synthesizers (as well as a cash register full of cookies), Mike Rutherford on a four-necked guitar, and two Phil Collins puppets: one on the drums, and one singing.

During the second verse, the video shows, in order: Benito Mussolini, Ayatollah Khomeini, Mikhail Gorbachev and his aides, and Muammar Gaddafi giving speeches on large video screens in front of mass crowds. Meanwhile, Reagan is shown putting on a Superman suit and running down a street while Collins sings,

Oh Superman where are you now
When everything's gone wrong somehow
The men of steel, the men of power
Are losing control by the hour.

Meanwhile, the "real world" Reagan is shown in a large pool of his own sweat (in which a rubber duck floats), as Nancy and the chimp look out the window. During the bridge, the Superman-costumed Reagan and a dinosaur resembling a ceratopsid watch a television showing various clips including Ed McMahon and Johnny Carson, Walter Cronkite, Richard Nixon, Mr. Spock (with a Rubik's Cube), and Bob Hope (reading out from cue cards).

This segues into a sequence set in prehistoric times, where the ceratopsid from earlier and a large theropod wearing a bow tie meet with Ronald and Nancy Reagan, as a pig-nosed mammal eats an egg and reads a newspaper, and Sylvester Stallone as Rambo standing in the background. At the end of this part, the chimp from the prologue takes a large bone from Reagan and tosses it in the air, mimicking the first part of 2001: A Space Odyssey (1968).

As the bone begins to fall, there is a shift to Collins catching a falling phone, into which he states: he "won't be coming home tonight, my generation will put it right", while a caricature of Prince applies mustard, ketchup, and a bun to his own tongue and devours it, and a caricature of Pete Townshend plays a guitar and gives a thumbs-up. On the other end of the phone line are Tina Turner, Madonna, and Grace Jones, each looking into hand-held mirrors. On the verse "we're not just making promises", the bone lands on top of David Bowie and Bob Dylan, barely missing Mick Jagger. Reagan is then shown dressed as a cowboy riding the ceratopsid dinosaur through the streets.

There are periodic scenes spoofing the 1985 all-star Live Aid anthem performances of "Do They Know It's Christmas?" by Band Aid and "We Are the World" by USA for Africa. The caricatured benefit recordings show a large group of spoofed celebrity and leader puppets, including Bruce Springsteen, Tina Turner, Sting, Cliff Richard, Bette Midler, Michael Jackson, Madonna (with a second mouth in place of her navel), Bill Cosby, Queen Elizabeth II, Paul McCartney, Ringo Starr, Princess Diana and Hulk Hogan singing along to the chorus of the song, with Pope John Paul II playing an electric guitar.

At the end of the video, Reagan awakens and surfaces from the pool of sweat surrounding him; Nancy is wearing a snorkel. After attempting to drink from a water glass (missing his mouth and even his face à la Airplane!), he fumbles for a button next to his bed. He intends to push the one labelled "Nurse", but instead presses the one titled "Nuke", setting off a nuclear explosion. Reagan then announces: "That's one heck of a nurse!" and mugs for the camera as Nancy strikes him with her snorkel.

The video, directed by John Lloyd and Jim Yukich, and produced by Jon Blair, won the short-lived Grammy Award for Best Concept Music Video during the 30th Annual Grammy Awards. The video was also nominated for an MTV Video Music Award for Video of the Year in 1987, but lost to "Sledgehammer" by Peter Gabriel (the former lead vocalist of Genesis). It also made the number-one spot on The Village Voice critic Robert Christgau's top 10 music videos in his year-end "Dean's List" feature, and number three on the equivalent list in his annual survey of music critics, Pazz & Jop (again losing out to "Sledgehammer").

== Live performances ==
The song was played on their Invisible Touch, The Way We Walk, Calling All Stations (with Ray Wilson on vocals), Turn It On Again and The Last Domino? tours.

== Track listings ==
7-inch: Virgin / GENS 3 (UK)

1. "Land of Confusion" – 4:45
2. "Feeding the Fire" – 5:54

7-inch: Atlantic / 7-89336 (U.S.)

1. "Land of Confusion" (LP Version) – 4:45
2. "Feeding the Fire" – 5:54

12-inch: Virgin / GENS 3–12 (UK)

1. "Land of Confusion" (Extended Remix) – 6:55
2. "Land of Confusion" – 4:45
3. "Feeding the Fire" – 5:54

12-inch: Virgin / 608 632-213 (Germany)

1. "Land of Confusion" (Extended Remix) – 6:55
2. "Land of Confusion" – 4:45
3. "Feeding the Fire" – 5:54

CD: Virgin / SNEG 3–12 (UK)

1. "Land of Confusion" – 4:45
2. "Land of Confusion" (Extended Remix) – 6:55
3. "Feeding the Fire" – 5:54
4. "Do the Neurotic" – 7:08

12-inch: Atlantic / PR 968 (U.S.)

1. "Land of Confusion" (Extended Remix) – 6:55
2. "Land of Confusion" – 4:45
- Remixes by John Potoker

UK enhanced version

1. "Land of Confusion"
2. "Sickened"
3. "Land of Confusion" (video)

UK, European and US vinyl 12-inch limited edition picture disc

1. "Land of Confusion"
2. "Sickened"

European version

1. "Land of Confusion" (version 1)
2. "Land of Confusion" (version 2)

== Personnel ==
- Phil Collins – vocals, acoustic and electronic drums
- Mike Rutherford – electric and bass guitars
- Tony Banks – keyboards, synth bass

== Charts ==
=== Weekly charts ===
Chart (1986–1987)	Peak position
Australia (Kent Music Report)	21
Austria (Ö3 Austria Top 40)	27
Belgium (Ultratop 50 Flanders)	14
Canada Top Singles (RPM)	8
Finland (Suomen virallinen lista)	18
Ireland (IRMA)	9
Netherlands (Dutch Top 40)	8
Netherlands (Single Top 100)	10
New Zealand (Recorded Music NZ)	9
Sweden (Sverigetopplistan)	10
Switzerland (Schweizer Hitparade)	8
UK Singles (Official Charts)	14
US Billboard Hot 100	4
US Album Rock Tracks (Billboard)	11
US Cash Box	5
West Germany (GfK)	7

Chart (2019)	Peak position
Poland Airplay (ZPAV)	82

=== Year-end charts ===
Chart (1987)	Rank
Canada Top Singles (RPM)	63
Netherlands (Dutch Top 40)	95
US Billboard Hot 100	40
West Germany (Media Control)	57

== Disturbed version ==
"Land of Confusion"

Single by Disturbed

from the album Ten Thousand Fists
- Released: 2006
- Genre: Heavy metal; hard rock; nu metal
- Length: 4:47
- Label: Reprise
- Songwriters: Mike Rutherford; Tony Banks; Phil Collins
- Producer: Johnny K

Disturbed singles chronology
"Just Stop" (2006)	"Land of Confusion" (2006)	"Ten Thousand Fists" (2006)

Music video
- "Land of Confusion" on YouTube

The American heavy metal band Disturbed released a cover of the song on their third studio album, Ten Thousand Fists (2005). The song became the fourth single from that album. Vocalist David Draiman commented that the aim of covering the song was "taking a song that's absolutely nothing like us and making it our own." The line "And the sound of your laughter" in the original's bridge was replaced by "In the wake of this madness," while the bridge of the song was replaced with a short solo by guitarist Dan Donegan.

It was accompanied by a music video animated by Todd McFarlane, known as the creator of the comics series Spawn. McFarlane had previously directed the animated music videos for the songs "Freak on a Leash" by Korn and "Do the Evolution" by Pearl Jam. According to McFarlane, the music video is "a big view of the corporate world and how it all ties into just one big beast for me... The world is run by one giant thing, which is driven by greed and lust." "Land of Confusion" reached No. 1 in the Hot Mainstream Rock Tracks; making it Disturbed's first No. 1 single on that chart.

The video starts out with The Guy, Disturbed's mascot, falling to earth. It then shows military forces bearing the symbol of a dollar sign within a circle of white within a field of red, followed by legions of black-clad soldiers reminiscent of Adolf Hitler's Schutzstaffel (SS). The video then shows the Guy, escaping bondage from chains, as the military forces continue to assault cities and civilians. Later on, leaders of various nations of the world (bearing close physical resemblance to George W. Bush, Vladimir Putin, Jacques Chirac, Junichiro Koizumi and Tony Blair) are shown sitting at a table with the same dollar sign on it. Eventually, the Guy confronts the soldiers, and leads the people in rebellion. Flags of several powerful nations are then shown, with the final flag sporting the dollar sign. The Guy leads the rebels to the headquarters of the United Nations where they disrupt a meeting of the U.N. representatives. The Guy then leads the angry mob into a back room where they confront the real power behind the throne, a gigantic, bloated Fat Cat. The mob then drags him to the ground and once immobilized, the Guy destroys the Fat Cat, who explodes into a shower of dollar bills.

=== Charts ===
Chart (2006)	Peak position
UK Singles (Official Charts)	79
US Billboard Mainstream Rock	1
US Alternative Airplay (Billboard)	18
US Bubbling Under Hot 100	5

=== Certifications ===
Region	Certification	Certified units/sales
Australia (ARIA)	Gold	35,000^{‡}
Canada (Music Canada)	Platinum	80,000^{‡}
New Zealand (RMNZ)	Gold	15,000^{‡}
United States (RIAA)	Platinum	1,000,000^{‡}
^{‡} Sales+streaming figures based on certification alone.

== See also ==
- List of Billboard Mainstream Rock number-one songs of the 2000s
