= Covered, A Revolution in Sound =

Studio album by various artists
- Released: March 10, 2009
- Length: 50:16
- Label: Warner Bros.
- Producer: Warner Bros. Records

Professional ratings
Review scores
Source	Rating
AllMusic	2/5 stars

Covered, A Revolution in Sound is a tribute album produced and released by Warner Bros. Records to commemorate its 50th anniversary as a record label. The album consists of some of the greatest hits from previous and current artists from the late 20th century, while the songs featured on the album themselves are performed by current artists that are signed to Warner Bros. Records. Warner's sister label Elektra Records had done something similar to this nearly 20 years before with an album titled Rubáiyát: Elektra's 40th Anniversary, which featured then-current Elektra artists covering other songs originally released on Elektra or sister label Asylum Records.

== Track listing ==
No.	Title	Writer(s)	Original artist	Length
1.	"Just Got Paid" (Mastodon)	Frank Beard; Billy Gibbons; Bill Ham	ZZ Top	3:35
2.	"Her Eyes Are a Blue Million Miles" (The Black Keys)	Don Van Vliet	Captain Beefheart	3:46
3.	"A Case of You" (Michelle Branch)	Joni Mitchell	Joni Mitchell	4:17
4.	"Here Comes a Regular" (Against Me!)	Paul Westerberg	The Replacements	5:07
5.	"More Than This" (Missy Higgins)	Bryan Ferry	Roxy Music	3:02
6.	"Into the Mystic" (James Otto)	Van Morrison	Van Morrison	3:44
7.	"Like a Hurricane" (Adam Sandler)	Neil Young	Neil Young and Crazy Horse	4:54
8.	"You Wreck Me" (Taking Back Sunday)	Tom Petty; Mike Campbell	Tom Petty	2:57
9.	"Burning Down the House" (The Used)	Talking Heads	Talking Heads	3:40
10.	"Midlife Crisis" (Disturbed)	Michael Bordin; Roddy Bottum; Bill Gould; James Martin; Michael Patton	Faith No More	4:04
11.	"Paranoid" (Avenged Sevenfold)	Anthony Iommi; William Ward; Terrence Butler; John Osbourne	Black Sabbath	2:44
12.	"Borderline" (The Flaming Lips with Stardeath and White Dwarfs)	Reggie Lucas	Madonna	5:56
