= Ten Thousand Fists =

- The cover of Ten Thousand Fists by Greg Capullo featuring the mascot of Disturbed, known as The Guy

Studio album by Disturbed
- Released: September 19, 2005
- Recorded: January – June 2005
- Studio: Groovemaster Studios (Chicago, Illinois)
- Genre: Heavy metal; alternative metal; nu metal; hard rock
- Length: 56:09
- Label: Reprise; Intoxication
- Producer: Johnny K; Disturbed

Disturbed chronology
| Music as a Weapon II (2004) | Ten Thousand Fists (2005) | Indestructible (2008) |

Singles from Ten Thousand Fists
- 1. "Guarded" Released: June 28, 2005; 2. "Stricken" Released: July 25, 2005; 3. "Just Stop" Released: February 7, 2006; 4. "Land of Confusion" Released: October 2, 2006; 5. "Ten Thousand Fists" Released: December 28, 2006

Ten Thousand Fists is the third studio album by American heavy metal band Disturbed. Released on September 19, 2005, by Reprise Records, it became the band's second consecutive number 1 debut on the Billboard 200 in the United States, shipping around 239,000 copies in its opening week. It has been certified 3× platinum by the RIAA and 2× platinum by Music Canada, and was the band's second number 1 in New Zealand, where it was certified gold. It is also the first Disturbed album not to have a Parental Advisory label.

Ten Thousand Fists marks the first album with bassist John Moyer, who replaced Steve Kmak following his dismissal in 2003. However, Moyer was considered a session musician during the recording, and only became a full-time member during the ensuing tour. The band's third and final collaboration with producer Johnny K, Ten Thousand Fists is also the first album to feature their mascot The Guy on the cover. He would later appear full-bodied in the video for the band's "Land of Confusion" cover.

Ten Thousand Fists is, as of 2010, Disturbed's second highest selling album in the United States, with sales of around 2 million copies. The Sickness, the band's debut, has shifted almost 4.2 million copies in the United States. The album was dedicated to Dimebag Darrell, murdered the year before the album's release.

== Promotion ==
The album title was announced via Disturbed's website on June 16, 2005. Later that month, the track listing was revealed. The song "Guarded" was released to radio stations in late June 2005 as a teaser. Vocalist David Draiman said the motive behind releasing the song was to promote the album. He said, "[The song] was put out there to just whet everybody's appetite. It's one of the more aggressive tracks on the record, just to remind everybody where we came from and who we are."

The first single, "Stricken", was released on July 25, 2005. On August 19, 2005, the music video "Stricken", directed by Nathan Cox, was posted on the Warner Bros. Records website. The music video was filmed in an abandoned hospital, in the same location where some scenes from the 1984 horror film A Nightmare on Elm Street were filmed. In early August 2005, viral marketing was used to promote Ten Thousand Fists. A piece of software was sent via e-mail to certain recipients, who passed it along to other recipients. When the software was passed along to at least 250,000 recipients, it unlocked the song "Ten Thousand Fists". In early July 2006, the third single, "Land of Confusion" (originally written by Genesis), was released, alongside an animated music video directed by Todd McFarlane.

== Style ==
The album features several styles, including alternative metal, heavy metal, nu metal, and hard rock.

== Themes ==
Vocalist David Draiman said that Ten Thousand Fists "seems to fuse the brutality and darkness of The Sickness with the added melodic nature and complexity of Believe. It's more aggressive than the last record, and at times, more aggressive than the first one." The song "Overburdened" is about soldiers going to Hell. Draiman said that the song "Guarded" is about Draiman guarding himself from other people. He said the song "reflects what choosing this life forces certain people to do in a certain way — you have to remain guarded on a certain level." Draiman said the song "Ten Thousand Fists" is meant to "[signify] strength, unity, conviction, power, and the exhilaration that you feel when you get to see that at one of our shows." Draiman continued to say, "It's one of my favorite moments, and people know that I have an affinity for asking people to put their fists in the air, and it's just, it's exhilaration to be able to see ten thousand raised fists or more."

Other themes explored on the album include war and civil disorder. According to band members, while Ten Thousand Fists was not written as a political album, it was their most political record to date. Vocalist David Draiman's lyrics for the title song, "Ten Thousand Fists", were heavily influenced by his feelings towards American president George W. Bush, and several of the songs included anti-war themes, including "Deify", for which the intro features audio clips of Bush urging the nation to push forward in war, interlaced with an individual's political commentary, while the video for "Land of Confusion" depicts big business and capitalism as being a corrupting Nazi-style enemy being overthrown by an army of the people led by The Guy, the band's mascot.

== Critical reception ==
Professional ratings
Aggregate scores
| Source | Rating |
|---|---|
| Metacritic | 59/100 |
Review scores
| Source | Rating |
| AllMusic | 4/5 stars |
| Blender | 3/5 stars |
| IGN | 7.0/10 |
| Los Angeles Times | 2.5/4 stars |
| NME | 1/10 |
| Rolling Stone | 2/5 stars |

Ten Thousand Fists earned mixed reviews from critics; it received a score of 59% on the review-aggregating website Metacritic, based on seven reviews. AllMusic reviewer Johnny Loftus gave the album a positive review; however, regarding the album's sound, he stated "Ten Thousand Fists does start to sound the same after a while." The Village Voice's reviewer Phil Freeman also gave the album a positive review, "The guitarist and drummer are an airtight team, and the session bassist capably underpins the guitar solos that are a welcome new addition to the band's sound. Program out the cover of 'Land of Confusion' and you've got the best mainstream metal release since Judas Priest's Angel of Retribution." NME gave it a 1/10 review describing it as "unfocused rage" and "you'll find nothing more despicable this year".

=== Accolades ===
| Region | Year | Publication | Accolade | Rank |
|---|---|---|---|---|
| United States | 2015 | Loudwire | 10 Best Rock Albums of 2005 | 1 |
| United States | 2024 | Loudwire | The Best Hard Rock Album of Each Year Since 1970 | 1 |

== Track listing ==
All tracks are written by Disturbed, except "Land of Confusion", which was originally written by Tony Banks, Phil Collins, and Mike Rutherford.

| No. | Title | Length |
|---|---|---|
| 1. | "Ten Thousand Fists" | 3:32 |
| 2. | "Just Stop" | 3:45 |
| 3. | "Guarded" | 3:21 |
| 4. | "Deify" | 4:17 |
| 5. | "Stricken" | 4:06 |
| 6. | "I'm Alive" | 4:41 |
| 7. | "Sons of Plunder" | 3:49 |
| 8. | "Overburdened" | 5:58 |
| 9. | "Decadence" | 3:26 |
| 10. | "Forgiven" | 4:14 |
| 11. | "Land of Confusion" (Genesis cover) | 4:49 |
| 12. | "Sacred Lie" | 3:07 |
| 13. | "Pain Redefined" | 4:09 |
| 14. | "Avarice" | 2:55 |
| Total length: | | 56:09 |

iTunes deluxe bonus track
| No. | Title | Length |
|---|---|---|
| 15. | "Monster" | 4:03 |
| Total length: | | 60:12 |

Tour edition bonus tracks
| No. | Title | Length |
|---|---|---|
| 15. | "Monster" | 4:03 |
| 16. | "Two Worlds" | 3:30 |
| Total length: | | 63:42 |

Tour edition (bonus DVD)
| No. | Title | Length |
|---|---|---|
| 1. | "Just Stop" (live from Riviera) | 3:57 |
| 2. | "Just Stop" (from Yahoo Music Artist Mods) | 3:44 |
| 3. | "Stricken" | 4:10 |
| 4. | "The Making of Stricken" | 20:07 |
| 5. | "Land of Confusion" | 4:47 |
| 6. | "Network Live Show: 1: Liberate – 3:52; 2: Decadence – 3:47; 3: Fear – 3:53; 4: Prayer – 3:42; 5: Remember – 4:11; 6: Stupify – 4:09; 7: Deify – 4:16; 8: Just Stop – 3:35; 9: Voices – 3:29; 10: Land of Confusion – 4:47; 11: The Game – 4:00; 12: Stricken – 6:49; 13: Down with the Sickness – 6:02" | 57:22 |
| Total length: | | 94:07 |

The UK and Tour editions of the album both feature four bonus tracks ("Monster", "Two Worlds", "Hell", and "Sickened"), the first of which was also included as an iTunes bonus track. All four songs are also included in the band's B-side compilation The Lost Children.

== Personnel ==
Disturbed

- David Draiman – lead vocals
- Dan Donegan – guitars, electronics
- Mike Wengren – drums, percussion

Session member

- John Moyer – bass, backing vocals

Production

- Johnny K – production
- Disturbed – production, art direction
- Ben Grosse – mixing
- Paul Pavao – assistant mixing
- Ted Jensen – mastering
- Aiden Mullen – guitar technician
- Jeff Aldrich – A&R
- Ellen Wakayama – art direction
- Matt Taylor – art direction, design
- Todd McFarlane – artwork
- Greg Capullo – artwork
- Clay Patrick McBride – photography

== Charts ==
=== Weekly charts ===
| Chart (2005–2008) | Peak position |
|---|---|
| Australian Albums (ARIA) | 11 |
| Austrian Albums (Ö3 Austria) | 37 |
| Canadian Albums (Billboard) | 2 |
| Dutch Albums (Album Top 100) | 87 |
| German Albums (Offizielle Top 100) | 21 |
| New Zealand Albums (RMNZ) | 1 |
| Scottish Albums (OCC) | 62 |
| Swedish Albums (Sverigetopplistan) | 24 |
| Swiss Albums (Schweizer Hitparade) | 62 |
| UK Albums (OCC) | 59 |
| US Billboard 200 | 1 |
| US Top Catalog Albums (Billboard) | 13 |
| US Top Hard Rock Albums (Billboard) | 17 |
| US Top Rock Albums (Billboard) | 9 |

| Chart (2025) | Peak position |
|---|---|
| Croatian International Albums (HDU) | 7 |
| Hungarian Physical Albums (MAHASZ) | 16 |

=== Year-end charts ===
| Chart (2005) | Position |
|---|---|
| US Billboard 200 | 113 |
| Chart (2006) | Position |
| US Billboard 200 | 80 |

=== Singles ===
| Year | Song | Chart | Peak position |
|---|---|---|---|
| 2005 | "Guarded" | Hot Mainstream Rock Tracks | 7 |
| 2005 | "Guarded" | Alternative Songs | 28 |
| 2006 | "Just Stop" | Hot Mainstream Rock Tracks | 4 |
| 2006 | "Just Stop" | Alternative Songs | 24 |
| 2006 | "Land of Confusion" | Hot Mainstream Rock Tracks | 1 |
| 2006 | "Land of Confusion" | Alternative Songs | 18 |
| 2006 | "Land of Confusion" | UK Singles Chart | 79 |
| 2006 | "Stricken" | US Billboard Hot 100 | 95 |
| 2006 | "Stricken" | Hot Mainstream Rock Tracks | 2 |
| 2006 | "Stricken" | Alternative Songs | 13 |
| 2006 | "Stricken" | Pop 100 | 89 |
| 2006 | "Stricken" | UK Singles Chart | 88 |
| 2007 | "Ten Thousand Fists" | Hot Mainstream Rock Tracks | 7 |
| 2007 | "Ten Thousand Fists" | Alternative Songs | 37 |

== Certifications ==
| Region | Certification | Certified units/sales |
|---|---|---|
| Australia (ARIA) | Platinum | 70,000^{^} |
| Canada (Music Canada) | 2× Platinum | 200,000^{‡} |
| Denmark (IFPI Danmark) | Platinum | 20,000^{‡} |
| Germany (BVMI) | Gold | 100,000^{‡} |
| New Zealand (RMNZ) | Gold | 7,500^{^} |
| United Kingdom (BPI) | Gold | 100,000^{^} |
| United States (RIAA) | 3× Platinum | 3,000,000^{‡} |
^{^} Shipments figures based on certification alone.^{‡} Sales+streaming figures based on certification alone.
