= John Moyer =

American bassist (born 1973)

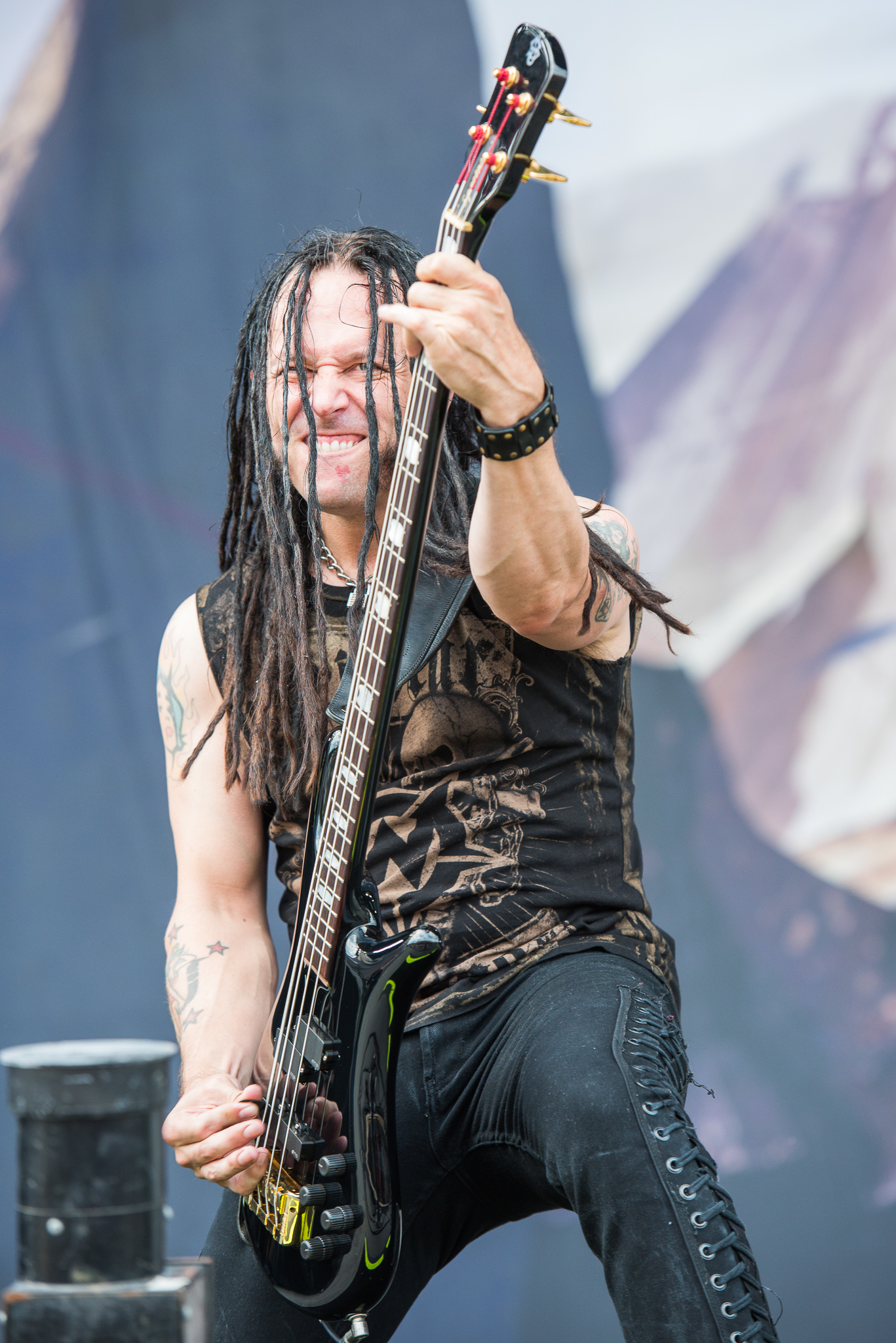
- Moyer performing with Disturbed at Rock im Park 2016

Background information
- Born: John Robert Moyer; November 30, 1973 (age 52); El Paso, Texas, U.S.
- Genres: Alternative metal; heavy metal; groove metal; progressive metal; hard rock; post-grunge; nu metal
- Occupation: Musician
- Instrument: Bass
- Years active: 1990–present
- Member of: Disturbed; The Foundry; Stereo Satellite
- Formerly of: The Union Underground; Soak; Adrenaline Mob; Art of Anarchy; Operation: Mindcrime; Dark Sky Choir
- Website: johnmoyermusic.com

John Robert Moyer (born November 30, 1973) is an American musician, best known as the bassist for the heavy metal band Disturbed. After the demise of his previous band, The Union Underground, Moyer took over for previous Disturbed bassist Steve "Fuzz" Kmak in 2004. Moyer has played with the group since their third studio album, Ten Thousand Fists, which he played on as a session member, becoming a full-time member around 2005 during the supporting tour for the album. Moyer has also played bass for the supergroup Adrenaline Mob, Art of Anarchy and Operation: Mindcrime. He currently also plays in Stereo Satellite.

== Biography ==
Moyer was born and raised in El Paso, Texas, and graduated from Coronado High School. Moyer was formerly part of the Texas hard rock act The Union Underground. Prior to his stint in The Union Underground, he was the bassist of the popular band Soak, also hailing from Texas. He is the owner and teaches at Natural Ear Music in Austin, Texas, where he works with a lot of young bands. Moyer works in partnership with Silver Tongue Management.

While he is still capable of playing finger-style, Moyer prefers picking because it has a more aggressive feeling.

In February 2012, it was announced that Moyer had joined the supergroup Adrenaline Mob while Disturbed was on hiatus.

In April 2013, Moyer was announced to be filling in for Rudy Sarzo on bass for five tour dates in Geoff Tate's lineup formed after his dismissal from Queensrÿche.

In August 2014, Moyer announced that he would not be joining Adrenaline Mob for their upcoming fall tours. As a result, the band began looking for a new bassist, thus ending Moyer's tenure with the band.

In January 2015, Moyer originally formed the band with Scott Weiland, Ron "Bumblefoot" Thal, twins Jon and Vince Votta entitled Art of Anarchy, and released their debut self-titled album in 2015 shortly before Scott Weiland's death in December 2015.

== Equipment ==
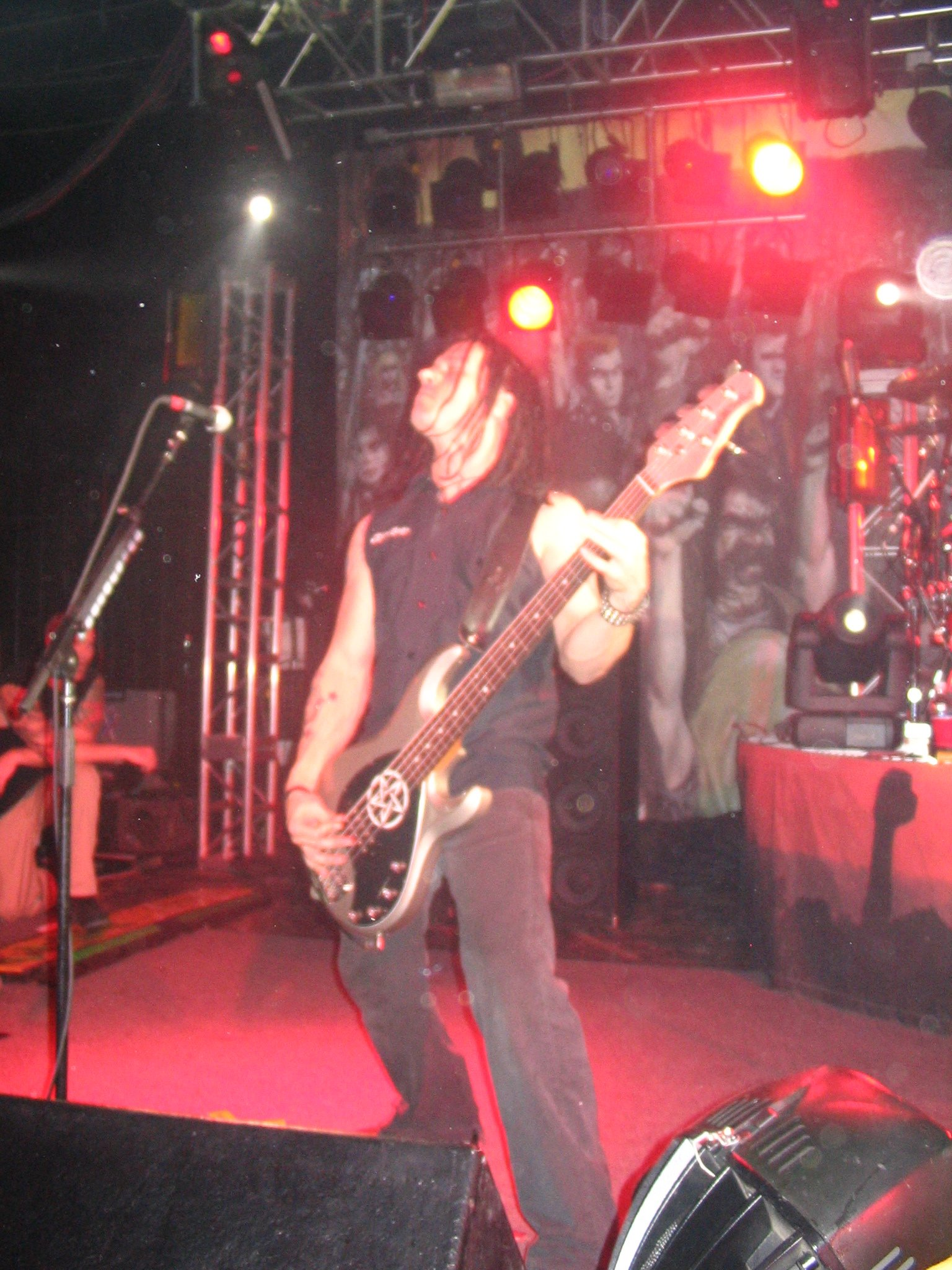
Moyer performing with Disturbed at the Starland Ballroom in late 2005

Moyer had a custom line with Traben bass company. He and the company produced his signature Traben Havoc. He also has custom amps with Kustom featuring his own design printed on the front resembling a skull engulfed in flames. More recently he signed a new deal with Hartke amps that he uses currently.

At one point, Moyer also signed an endorsement deal with BC Rich Guitars; for a while, the company manufactured Moyer's signature Havoc bass guitar. They can do this because they are owned by the same holding company as Traben. However in 2014, he has been seen with some Spector bass models like Euro LX5 and signed on as an endorser soon after. Additionally, he has been seen with a few other bass guitars over the years, most notably Music Man Stingrays.

Bass guitars

- B.C. Rich Havoc 4 and 5 string signature bass guitars (formerly made by Traben)
- Music Man Stingray 5 string bass guitar
- Spector Euro LX5 4 and 5 string bass guitars (currently, B.C. Rich and Music Man models very seldom used)

Amplifiers

- Various Hartke models (currently)
- Kustom Groove 1300 HD bass amplifier head (previously)
- Kustom John Moyer G-810H JM 8x10 bass cabinets (previously)

== Discography ==
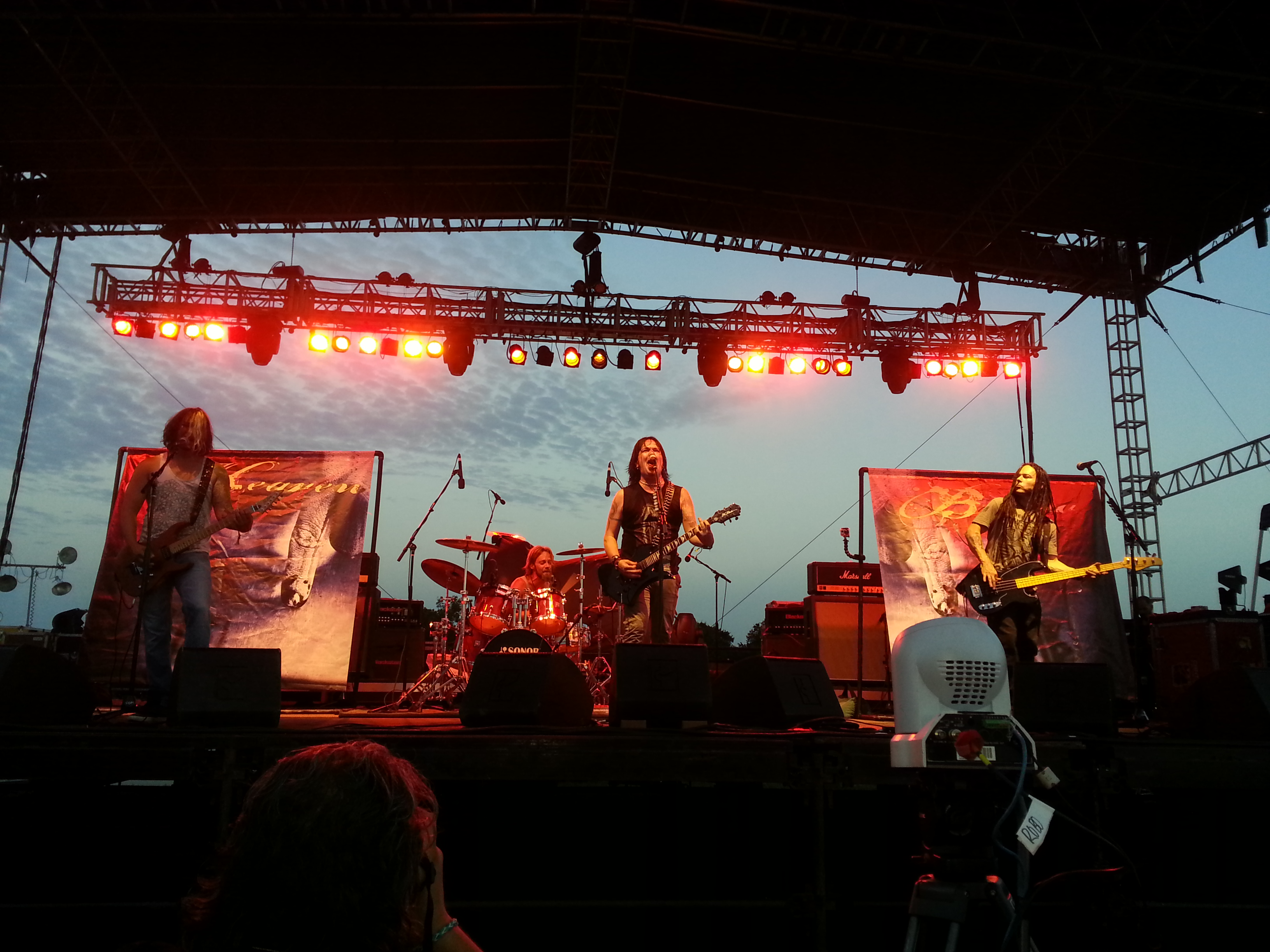
Moyer (right) performing with rock band Heaven Below

=== Soak ===
- Omniphonic Globalnova (1995)
- Self-Titled (1997)
- Flywatt (1998)
- 2179 (1999)

=== The Union Underground ===
- An Education in Rebellion (2000)

=== Disturbed ===
- Ten Thousand Fists (2005)
- Indestructible (2008)
- Asylum (2010)
- The Lost Children (2011)
- Evolution (2018)
- Divisive (2022)

=== Adrenaline Mob ===
- Covertà (2013)
- Men of Honor (2014)

=== Art of Anarchy ===
- Art of Anarchy (2015)
- The Madness (2017)

=== Operation: Mindcrime ===
- The Key (2015)

=== Solo ===
- Scivelation – Soundtrack (2012)

=== Dark Sky Choir ===
- Reboot (2018)

=== As producer ===
- Snake Skin Prison – Come and Take It – single (2012)
- Dharma Kings – T-Minus Zero – album (2018)
- Mick Blankenship – Crown of Apathy – album (2018)
- Kamisado – Choices – single (2018)
- Through the Flames – Hate Breeds Hate – album (2019)
- Hanna Barakat – Siren – album (2019)
- Dark Sky Choir – End of Days – album (2019)

== Filmography ==
- The Making of Indestructible
- Indestructible in Germany
- Decade of Disturbed
- Rock House Method: John Moyer – Modern Metal Bass

== Awards and nominations ==
Loudwire Music Awards

Year	Nominee / work	Award	Result
2015	John Moyer	Best Bassist	Nominated
