= Mike Wengren =

American drummer

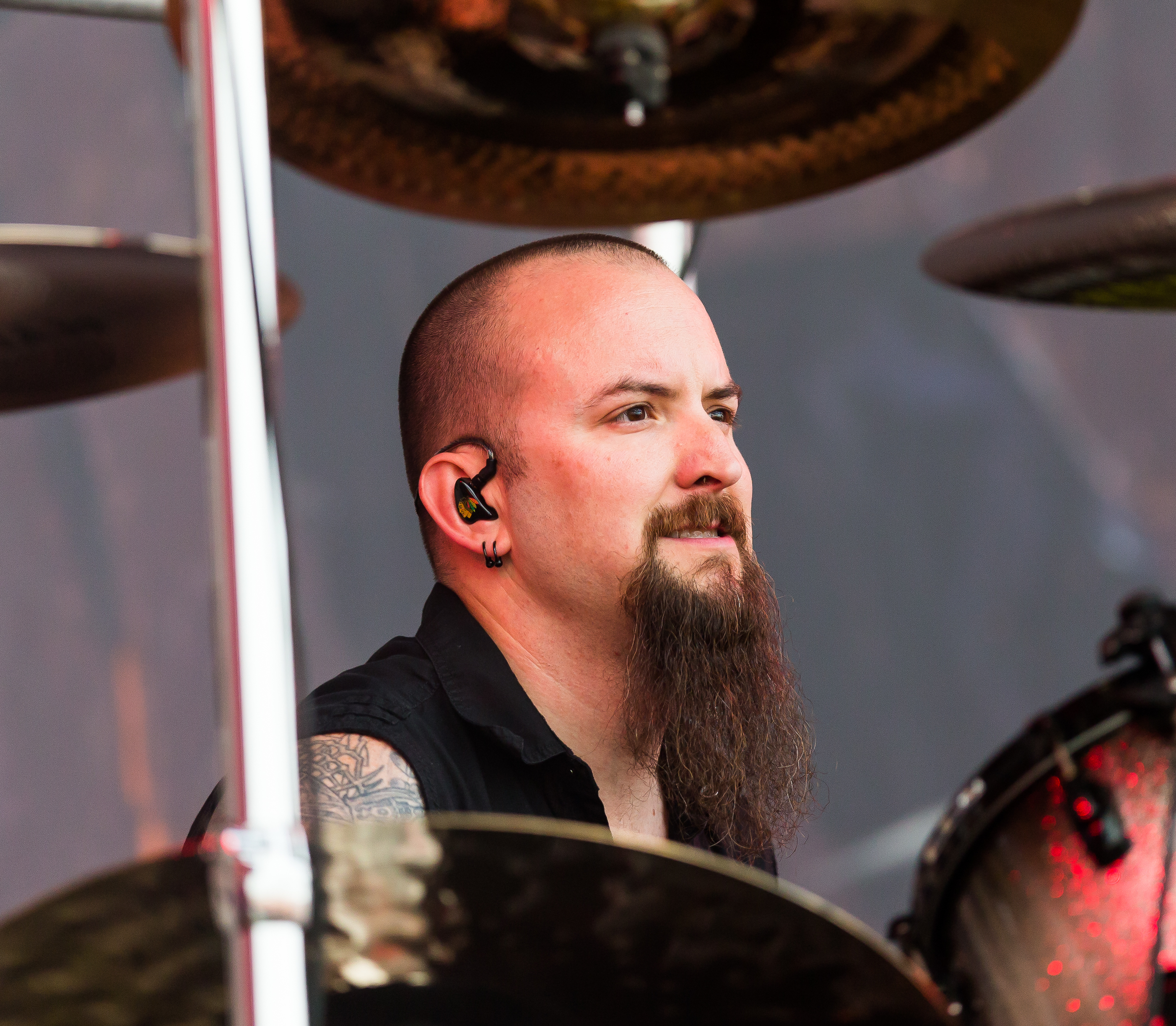
- Wengren performing with Disturbed in 2016

Background information
- Born: Chicago, Illinois
- Genres: Alternative metal; heavy metal; hard rock; nu metal
- Occupation: Musician
- Instrument: Drums
- Years active: 1994–present
- Member of: Disturbed
- Formerly of: Fight or Flight
- Website: disturbed1.com

Michael Wengren is an American drummer, best known as a member of the heavy metal band Disturbed. He is one of the founding members of the band, which was formed in 1994. Wengren is known for his bass drum techniques that have become a staple of Disturbed's music.

== Biography ==
Born and raised in Chicago, Illinois, Wengren has been playing drums since around the age of 10. He attended Curie High School on the Southwest side of Chicago.

He has been quoted as saying that Metallica, Slayer, Judas Priest, Testament, Mötley Crüe, Pantera, Iron Maiden, and Racer X were his strongest influences.

On August 31, 2005, before the set closed, frontman David Draiman handed the microphone to Wengren, who invited his girlfriend onstage and proposed marriage to her.

In 2013, Wengren pursued a side project band, Fight or Flight, in collaboration with Disturbed member Dan Donegan. In 2020, Wengren became a partial owner of Steel Tank Brewing Company in Oconomowoc, Wisconsin.

== Endorsements ==
In recent years, Wengren has appeared in advertisements for Pearl Drums, since the Masters Series was his first professional kit purchased from Midwest Percussion the early 1990s. Wengren uses Evans Hydraulic Glass drumheads on all toms and EQ3 heads on both bass drums. He has been added to the Vater Signature line of drumsticks, which now has a Mike Wengren model. Additionally, he uses Sabian cymbals.

His previous tour kit was a 'cranberry fade' Pearl MRX Masters Series drumset with black hardware. Wengren's tour kit in support of the album Ten Thousand Fists was a 'vintage sunburst' variation of the same drumset, also with black hardware.

== Discography ==
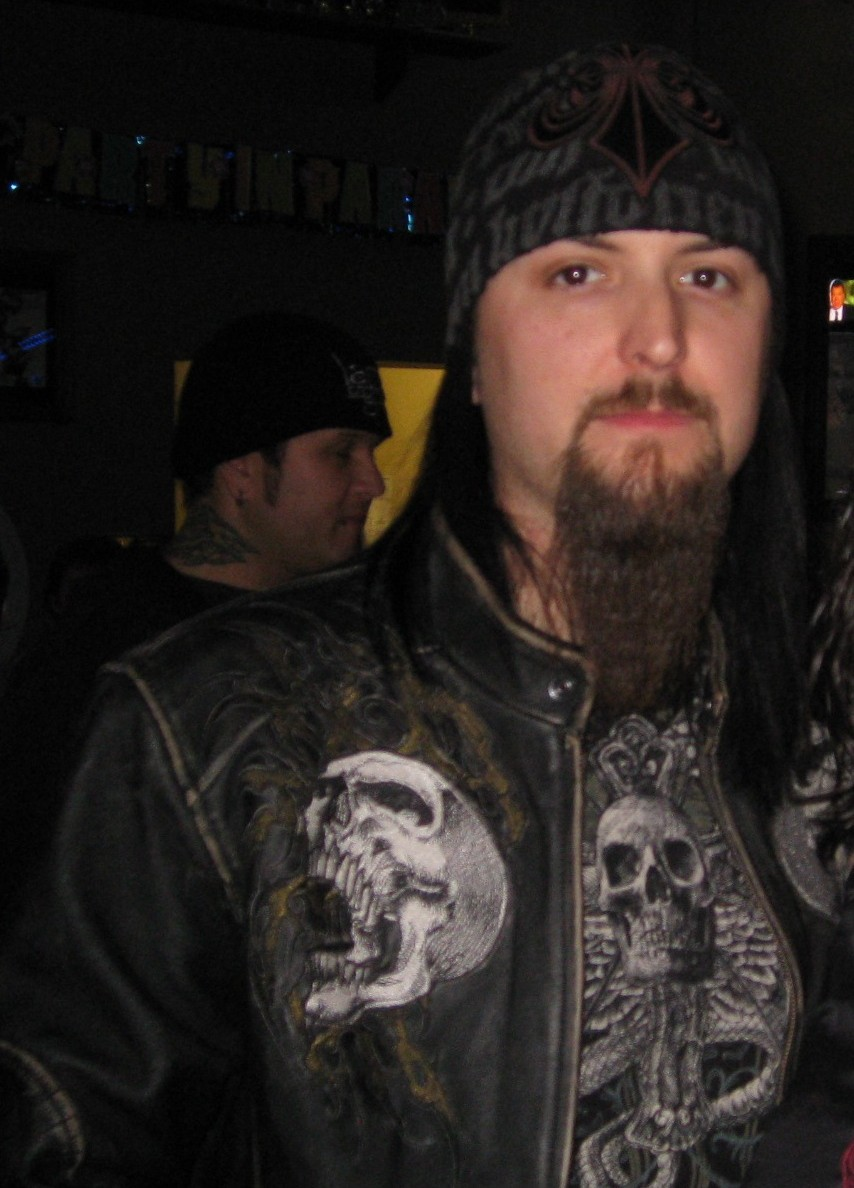
Wengren in 2008

=== Brawl ===
- Demo Tape (1994)

=== Disturbed ===
- The Sickness (2000)
- Believe (2002)
- Ten Thousand Fists (2005)
- Indestructible (2008)
- Asylum (2010)
- The Lost Children (2011)
- Immortalized (2015)
- Evolution (2018)
- Divisive (2022)

=== Fight or Flight ===
- A Life by Design? (2013)

=== Other appearances ===
- "Let the Truth Be Known" (2008)
- "A Song for Chi" (2009)

== Awards and nominations ==
Loudwire Music Awards

Year	Nominee / work	Award	Result
2015	Mike Wengren	Best Drummer	Nominated
