= Dan Donegan =

American guitarist

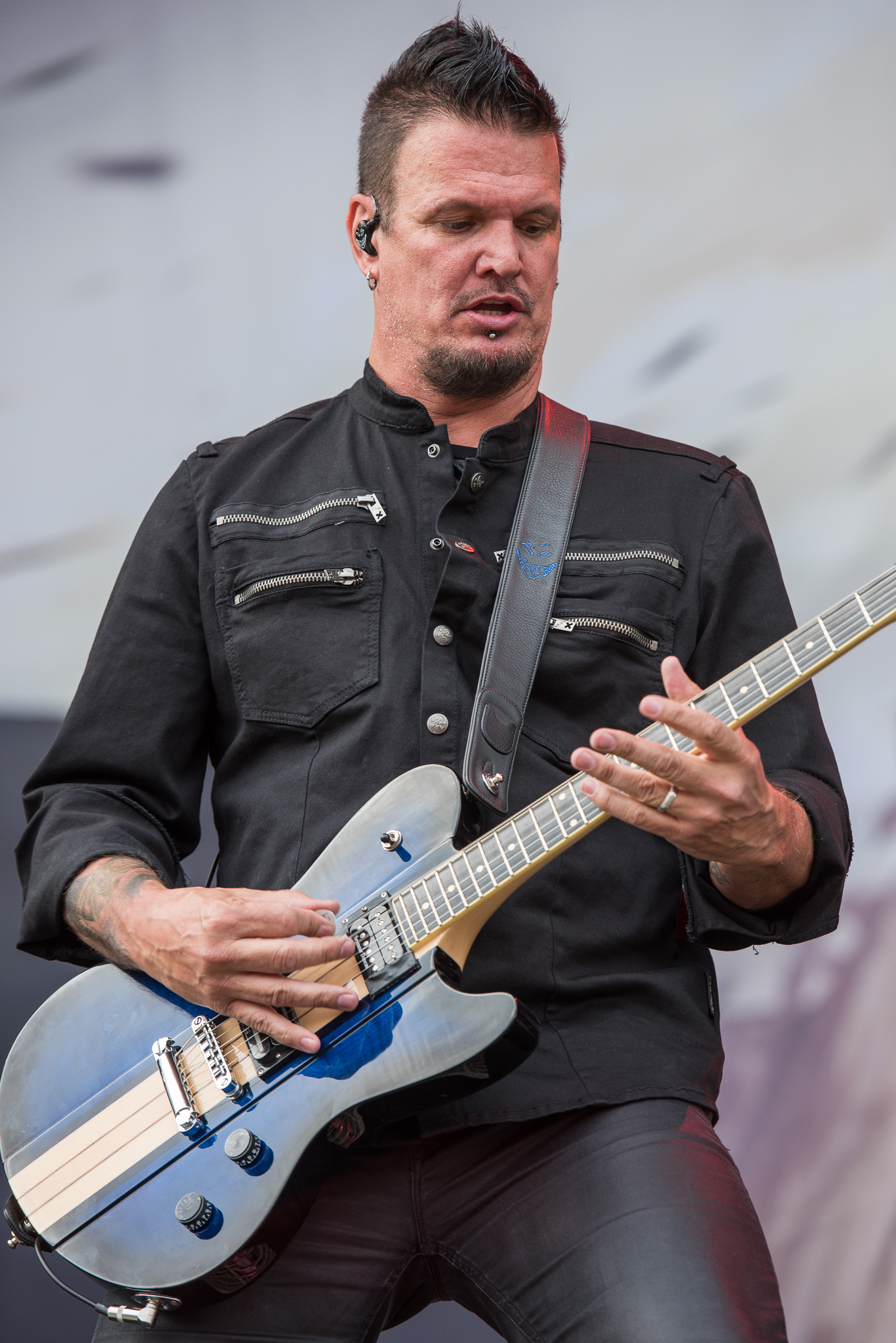
- Donegan performing with Disturbed at Rock im Park 2016

Background information
- Born: Daniel Joseph Donegan; August 1, 1968 (age 58); Oak Lawn, Illinois, U.S.
- Genres: Heavy metal; alternative metal; nu metal; hard rock; post-grunge
- Occupations: Musician; record producer
- Instruments: Guitar; keyboards
- Years active: 1986–present
- Member of: Disturbed
- Formerly of: Fight or Flight; Vandal
- Website: disturbed1.com

Daniel Joseph Donegan (born August 1, 1968) is an American musician who is the guitarist and one of the founding members of heavy metal band Disturbed.

Donegan began playing guitar as a teenager and eventually formed a band called Vandal, which was a 1980s-style glam metal band. He also played with some of the members of Vandal in another band that was called Loudmouth, and has pursued a side project band, Fight or Flight, in collaboration with Disturbed band member Mike Wengren.

Donegan was added to the guitar show Chop Shop's list of "Top 100 Most Complete Guitar Players of All Time" at number 76. Some journalists consider him to be among the best nu metal guitarists of all time.

== Personal life ==
Donegan had very long hair during the early days of Brawl and Disturbed. According to Disturbed's DVD titled M.O.L., Donegan got a job with his father doing construction work. He was required to cut his hair for the job; instead, Donegan opted to wear a wig to fool his dad and keep his long hair. It worked, and his dad eventually let him keep his long hair. He was married to Nicole Sardo from 2002 until they divorced in 2020. They have a daughter and son together.

== Technique and style ==
Donegan is a self-taught guitarist. He uses one handed and two handed tapping in many of his solos, with hammer-ons, pull-offs, and legato, sometimes using the "flick off" technique, as used in the solo for the song "Indestructible", and in others as well. His heavy riffs and sweep picking are seen in many music videos. He also combines arpeggios with finger tapping and many other techniques. He is known for shredding in some songs and uses finger vibrato on occasion. He uses the whammy bar in many songs to give it a certain sound effect.

In the video "The Making of Indestructible", Donegan mentions that he prefers "tasteful" solos, as opposed to shredding solos that rely primarily on speed. Disturbed's frontman David Draiman mentions "he [Donegan] can rip with the best of them". David also mentions that "He's [Donegan], in my opinion, you know, among the best in existence, and he doesn't give himself enough credit". In the 1980s, Donegan was in a glam metal band known as Vandal, where many of his solos were shred guitar solos. Donegan would incorporate other techniques, which many consider his own style of playing.

== Equipment ==
While playing with Loudmouth, Dan played an Ibanez Iceman amplified through a Peavey Ultra 120 head with Peavey 4x12 cabinets. Early on with his career with Disturbed, Donegan played Gibson Les Paul Standards and SGs. In some early photos with Brawl, he can also be seen with a Gibson Explorer. Then, he switched to play a few Paul Reed Smith models, the Tremonti Model and a PRS Singlecut. In 2005, Washburn Guitars built Donegan his own signature model called the Maya, named after his daughter. For 2010, Dan built a signature guitar with Schecter guitars, that is based on the ultra classic model (his being the ultra DD). Donegan is a fan of GHS Boomer guitar strings and uses the 12-52 gauge set. He also uses Seymour Duncan pickups in his guitars. He is currently signed to Schecter Guitars and uses custom leather guitar straps made by Orion Guitar Gear. In 2016, Dan and Orion Guitar Gear teamed up to sell a limited quantity of his custom straps to Disturbed fans.

=== Guitars ===
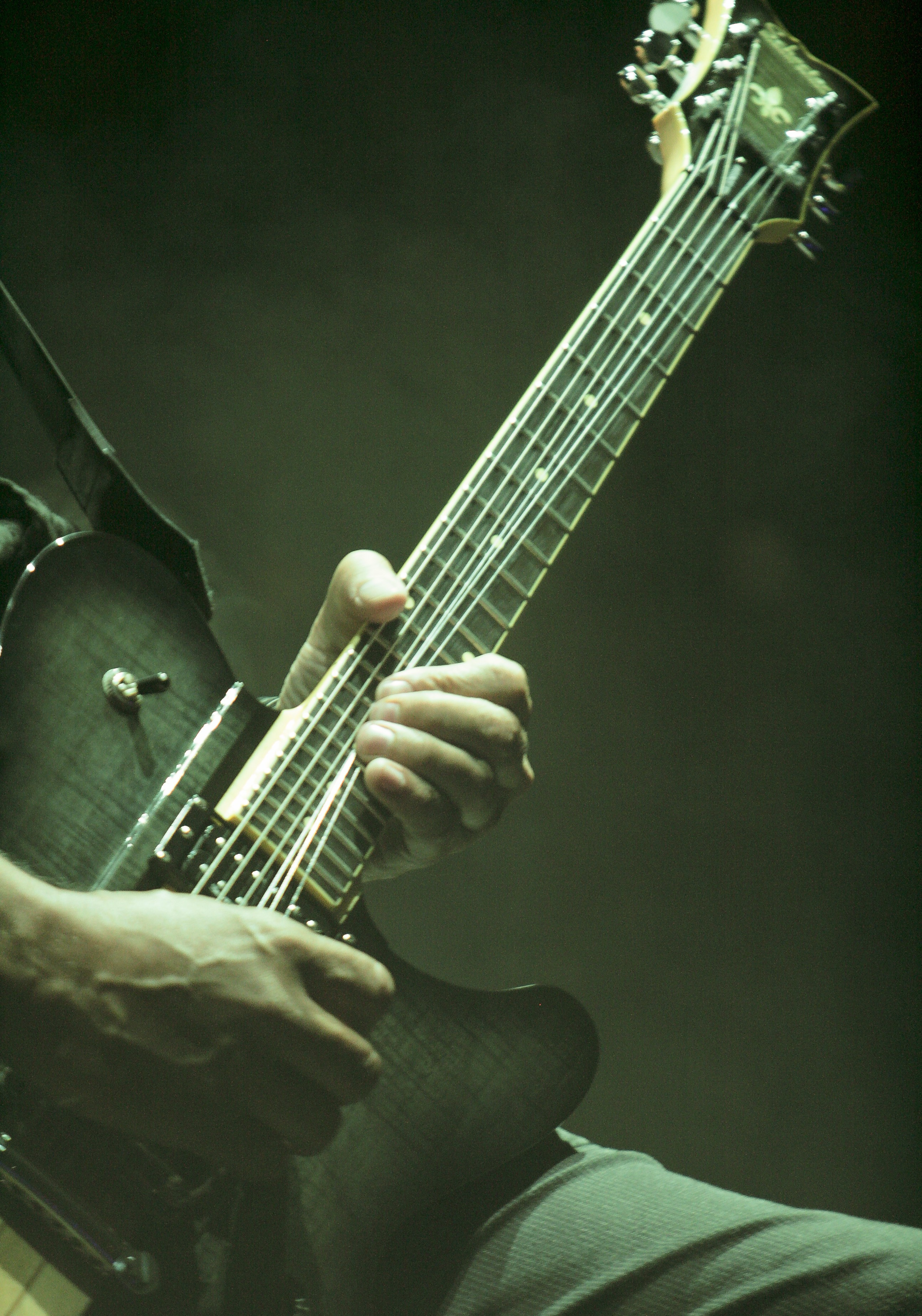
The Schecter Ultra Dan Donegan signature model

- Current:
- Schecter Ultra Dan Donegan signature model
- Schecter Solo-6 2010 limited edition (used in the studio for Asylum)
- Past:
- Washburn Maya DD81 signature model (Indestructible)
- Washburn Maya signature model (Ten Thousand Fists)
- PRS Singlecut (Believe)
- PRS Mark Tremonti (Believe)
- Gibson Les Paul Standards (The Sickness)
- Gibson SGs (The Sickness)
- Gibson Explorer (used in the early days with Brawl)
- Ibanez Iceman (used in the early days of Disturbed)

=== Amplifiers ===
- Randall RM4 preamp with 1 "Clean" and 3 "1086" modules into a RT2/50 Power Amp. Has used Randall Cyclone and V-Max heads in the past since 2001, when Dan received an endorsement. Uses Randall R412XLT cabs
- Mesa/Boogie Dual and Triple Rectifier amps with Rectifier 4x12 cabs. Used until his Randall endorsement.
- Bogner Ecstasy heads
- Marshall heads and 4x12 cabinets in his early career

== Discography ==
=== Vandal ===
- Better Days

=== Brawl ===
- Demo Tape (1994)

=== Disturbed ===
- The Sickness (2000)
- Believe (2002)
- Ten Thousand Fists (2005)
- Indestructible (2008)
- Asylum (2010)
- The Lost Children (2011)
- Immortalized (2015)
- Evolution (2018)
- Divisive (2022)

=== Fight or Flight ===
- A Life by Design? (2013)
