= David Draiman =

American singer

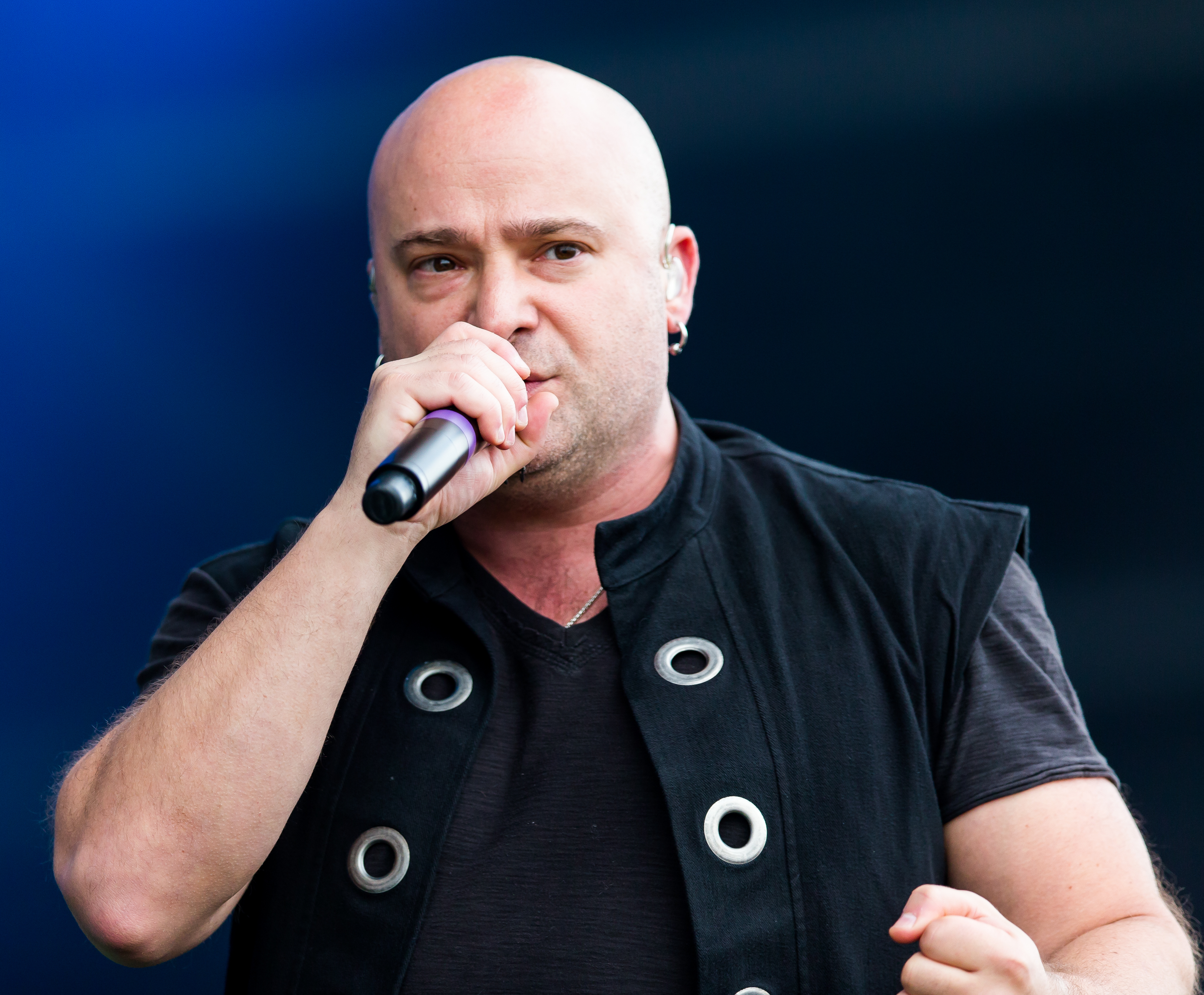
- Draiman performing in 2016

Background information
- Born: David Michael Draiman; March 13, 1973 (age 53); New York City, U.S.
- Origin: Chicago, Illinois, U.S.
- Genres: Alternative metal; heavy metal; hard rock; nu metal
- Occupations: Singer; songwriter
- Years active: 1996–present
- Member of: Disturbed
- Formerly of: Device
- Website: disturbed1.com

David Michael Draiman (born March 13, 1973) is an American heavy metal singer. Noted for his distorted baritone voice and percussive singing style, he has been the lead vocalist of Disturbed since 1996. He has written some of the band's most successful singles, such as "Stupify", "Down with the Sickness", "Indestructible" and "Inside the Fire". In 2006, he was ranked at No. 42 on the Hit Parader list of "Top 100 Metal Vocalists of All Time". During Disturbed's hiatus from 2011 to 2015, he worked on an industrial metal project with Geno Lenardo, which was later named Device. They released one self-titled album in 2013. Disturbed returned with the album Immortalized in 2015, Evolution in 2018, and Divisive in 2022.

== Early life ==
David Michael Draiman (Hebrew: דוד מיכאל דריימן) was born to Jewish parents in the Brooklyn borough of New York City on March 13, 1973. His father, Yehuda "YJ" (Hebrew: יהודה דריימן), had worked as a real estate developer and small-business owner before he was arrested for embezzlement and sent to prison when Draiman was 12 years old. YJ later became a candidate in the races for Mayor of Los Angeles in 2013, 2017, and 2022. Draiman's brother, Benjamin, is an ambient musician who lives in Israel. His grandmother Ziona is a Yemenite Jew whose family immigrated to British Mandatory Palestine in the early 1900s.

Draiman's parents sent him to Orthodox schools, where he believed he was on the path to receiving rabbinic ordination. He frequently spent time in Israel during his early life. He attended five Jewish day schools, including Valley Torah High School in Los Angeles, where he formed his first band; Fasman Yeshiva High School in Skokie, Illinois, a near north suburb of Chicago; and the Wisconsin Institute for Torah Study in Milwaukee. During his freshman year at the latter, he was asked to leave as he "rebelled against the conformity" and "just wanted to be a normal teenage kid", adding that he "couldn't really stomach the rigorous religious requirements of the life [there]". He has admitted to being "a bit resentful" about his time at Jewish day schools, but nevertheless became trained as a hazzan (cantor) and encouraged his family to observe Shabbat.

Draiman later enrolled at Ida Crown Jewish Academy, located in the West Ridge neighborhood of Chicago, and graduated from high school in 1991. From 1991 to 1992, he became romantically involved with a girl who used heroin and eventually killed herself. At the age of 18, on New Year's Day 1992, he attempted to kill himself but says that he instead woke up later to find himself nearly frozen to death underneath a parked 1972 Oldsmobile Cutlass. After detoxing, he described having a "moment of clarity" and never used heroin again. After high school, he spent a year studying at the Yeshivas Neveh Zion in Kiryat Ye'arim on the outskirts of Jerusalem.

After returning to the U.S. in 1992, Draiman commenced pre-law studies at Loyola University Chicago. In 1996, he graduated with a BA in Political Science and Government, Philosophy, and Business Administration. Initially considering offers to study at law school, he realized that criminal defense law was the only area of law that interested him, which made him unwilling to pursue law because he knew he would not be able to "really look at [himself] in the mirror and say 'I'm going to lie for a living and protect criminals'". During his university studies, he also worked as a bank teller and in phone sales. After graduating, he worked as an administrative assistant in a healthcare facility. A year later, he earned an administrator's license and ran his own healthcare facility for five years before joining Disturbed. Leaving that position strained his relationship with his grandfather, who was a traditional Hasidic Jew.

== Career ==
David Draiman Performing in 2011 at Arco Arena in Sacramento, CA. March 13, 2011.png To use the file in a wiki, copy this text into a page: [[File:David Draiman Performing in 2011 at Arco Arena in Sacramento, CA. March 13Sacramento,_CA._March_13,_2011.png

In 1996, Draiman auditioned to be lead singer for the band Brawl, which was later renamed to Disturbed. He auditioned and was asked to join the band after answering an advertisement the other members had placed in a local music publication in Chicago, which he later revealed was one of around 20 auditions for other bands he had attended that month. Guitarist Dan Donegan said of Draiman's audition,

"You know, out of all the singers that we had talked to or auditioned, he was the only singer who was ready to go with originals. And that impressed me, just to attempt that. After a minute or two, he just starts banging out these melodies that were huge... I'm playing my guitar and I'm grinning from ear to ear. [...] I was so psyched. Chill up my spine."

Draiman has written some of Disturbed's most successful singles, such as "Stupify", "Down with the Sickness", "Indestructible", and "Inside the Fire". In 2006, he was ranked at No. 42 on the Hit Parader list of "Top 100 Metal Vocalists of All Time".

During Disturbed's hiatus from 2011 to 2015, Draiman worked on an industrial metal project with Geno Lenardo, which was later named Device. They released one self-titled album in 2013. Disturbed returned with the album Immortalized in 2015 and Evolution in 2018.

== Artistry ==
Draiman sings in the baritone range. He has been known to pretend to receive an electrical injury at the beginning of Disturbed's live sets.

Draiman has said of his influences, "The first record I ever bought was Kiss' Destroyer. And those classic bands like Black Sabbath were my first loves. [...] I focused on the seminal metal bands like Metallica, Iron Maiden, Pantera and Queensrÿche. But I could also appreciate the hair metal bands – When you hear Whitesnake, you can't deny their greatness. Then I went in the direction of punk and new wave, groups like the Sex Pistols, The Ramones, The Misfits and later The Smiths and The Cure – that was my '80s. [...] And then when the grunge revolution happened, it was like a wakeup call. I'll never forget getting my first Nirvana, Soundgarden and Alice in Chains records."

Draiman has been known to stylize his social media posts with Caps Lock activated, "which is akin to yelling in web etiquette," according to Loudwire.

== Personal life ==
On September 25, 2011, Draiman married model and actress Lena Yada. Their son was born in September 2013. They divorced in 2023. In May 2025, he got engaged to model Sarah Uli. They became engaged at the Disturbed: The Sickness 25th Anniversary concert in Sacramento, California on May 9, 2025, when he proposed to her on stage. They got married on November 16, 2025.

== Political views ==
Draiman has stated that revisiting interviews from earlier in his career has caused him to reevaluate the manner in which he has expressed certain viewpoints: "I’ve looked back at some of my earlier quotes and, regardless of whether or not things were taken out of context, I have to hit myself in the head and think, 'What the hell was I saying?! Why did I say that thing like that?!' I think that when you set yourself up to be a target, people are more than willing to take pot-shots at you."

Regarding his political views, Draiman stated in 2015: "I'm liberal about everything that is issue-based as far as ideology, but I'm also of the opinion of a very small government. I don't agree with the fiscal policies of the Democrats, but I certainly don't agree with the right-wing craziness of the Republicans." He supported Bernie Sanders' 2016 presidential campaign. In March 2022, Draiman and M. Shadows (of Avenged Sevenfold) both criticized the Florida Parental Rights in Education Act.

He has described himself as "a very, very strong supporter of Israel". In 2019, he described singer Roger Waters and other activists seeking to boycott Israel for perceived human rights abuses as "Nazi comrades". In October 2023, Draiman denounced the attacks on Israel carried out by Hamas and several other Palestinian militant groups as acts of terrorism. In June 2024, he posted photos of himself visiting Israel Defense Forces troops serving in the Gaza war and writing "Fuck Hamas" on a 155mm artillery shell.

Some members of the audience booed Draiman during his appearance at the Back to the Beginning concert in July 2025, and the negative reaction was speculated as a reaction to Draiman's views on the Israel-Hamas conflict. He blamed the booing on "a few Jew hating morons" and said "I am still unapologetically a fiercley pro Israel Jew". He called fellow musician Tom Morello "shameful" for praising the Irish hip-hop group Kneecap, characterizing the latter as "support[ing] terror, and incit[ing] Jew hatred". Members of Kneecap responded by posting to social media an image of Draiman signing the Israeli artillery shell which they characterized as "Smiling and signing bombs dropped to murder kids and other people's families", while Draiman's rejoinder stressed: "That shell was meant for Hamas. You know, the organisation [sic] who has sworn to murder all Jews".

== Discography ==
David Draiman Performing in 2011 at Arco Arena in Sacramento, CA. March 13, 2011.

=== Disturbed ===
- The Sickness (2000)
- Believe (2002)
- Ten Thousand Fists (2005)
- Indestructible (2008)
- Asylum (2010)
- The Lost Children (2011)
- Immortalized (2015)
- Evolution (2018)
- Divisive (2022)

=== Device ===
- Device (2013)

=== Guest appearances ===
- "Forsaken" (written by Jonathan Davis) (2002)
- "Here's to Us" (guest version) (2012)
- "Dance in the Rain" (guest vocals for Megadeth) (2013)
- "We Believe" (guest vocals for Hyro the Hero) (2020)
- "King of Misery" (co-written with Saul) (2020)
- "Dead Inside" (guest vocals for Nita Strauss) (2021) – No. 1 Mainstream Rock Songs
- "Angel Song" (guest vocals for Nothing More) (2024) – No. 1 Mainstream Rock Songs

=== As producer ===
- Trivium – Vengeance Falls (2013)
