= Enuff Z'nuff discography =

Enuff Z'Nuff discography
- Studio albums: 18
- Live albums: 6
- Compilation albums: 5
- Singles: 12
- Video albums: 3
- Music videos: 13

American rock band Enuff Z'Nuff currently has 18 studio albums, 6 live albums, and 5 compilations for a total of 29 official albums. Their highest charting singles were "Fly High Michelle" and "New Thing" from their 1989 self-titled release. A 3-disc compilation of previously unreleased material, Never Enuff, was released by Cleopatra Records in August 2021. Enuff Z'Nuff's latest studio release of new material, named Xtra Cherries, came out in July 2025. This became their 5th consecutive album with Chip Z'Nuff on lead vocals.

== Discography ==
=== Studio albums ===
Year	Album details	Peak chart positions				
Year	Album details	US	US Indie	JPN	UK	UK Indie
1989	Enuff Z'Nuff	74	×	-	-	-
1991	Strength	143	×	-	56	-
1993	Animals with Human Intelligence	-	×	49	-	-
1994	1985	-	×	-	-	-
1995	Tweaked	-	×	-	-	-
1996	Peach Fuzz	-	×	78	-	-
1997	Seven	-	×	-	-	-
1999	Paraphernalia	-	×	86	-	-
2000	10	-	×	60	-	-
2003	Welcome to Blue Island	-	-	90	-	-
2004	?	-	-	177	-	-
2009	Dissonance	-	-	140	-	-
2016	Clowns Lounge	-	-	167	-	-
2018	Diamond Boy	-	33	172	-	49
2020	Brainwashed Generation	-	-	-	-	-
2021	Hardrock Nite	-	-	-	-	-
2022	Finer than Sin	-	-	-	-	-
2025	Xtra Cherries	-	-	-	-	-
"—" denotes a recording that did not chart or was not released in that territory. "×" denotes periods where charts did not exist or were not archived.

=== Live albums ===
- Live (1998)
- One More for the Road (2005)
- Extended Versions (2006)
- Tonight, Sold Out (2008)
- Live and Peace 2009: 20th Anniversary Live at Club Citta (2009)
- Live at the Whisky A Go Go (2026)

=== Compilation albums ===
- Favorites (2003)
- Greatest Hits (2006)
- Covered in Gold (2014)
- Never Enuff: Rarities & Demos (2021)
- The 1987 Demos (2024)

=== Video albums ===
- Enuff Z'Nuff (VHS) (1990)
- Official Bootleg 1989-1997 (VHS) (1997)
- Favorites: Suck It & See (DVD) (2004 - UK Only)

=== Singles ===
- "New Thing" (1989) (U.S. Hot 100 #67, U.S. Mainstream Rock #35)
- "Fly High Michelle" (1990) (U.S. Hot 100 #47, U.S. Mainstream Rock #27)
- "Mother's Eyes" (1991) (U.S. Mainstream Rock #17)
- "Baby Loves You" (1991)
- "Right by Your Side" (1993)
- "Innocence" (1993) (no music video supported this single)
- "You Got a Hold of Me" (1994)
- "Bullet from a Gun" (1995)
- "Life Is Strange" (1996)
- "Wheels" (1997)
- "Freak" (1999)
- "There Goes My Heart" (2000)
- "The Stroke" (2014)
- "Dog on a Bone" (2016)
- "Diamond Boy" (2018)
- "Where Did You Go" (2019)
- "Broken Love" (2021)
- "Catastrophe" (2022)
- "Heavy Metal" (2025)

=== Soundtrack appearances ===
- Henry: Portrait of a Serial Killer (1990) - "Fingers on It"
- Northern Exposure (1992) - "I Could Never Be Without You"
- Beverly Hills 90210 (1992) - "Hot Little Summer Girl"
- Jerry Maguire (1996) - "Bring It On Home"
- Dead Awake (2001) - "Wake Up"
- The Promotion (2008) - "There Goes My Heart"
- Dahmer vs. Gacy (2010) - "Roll Me", "Can't Wait", "You & I", "Z Overture", "Rock N World", "Wheels", "Everything Works If You Let It"
- Peacemaker (2022) - "New Thing"

=== Other song appearances ===
- Webster Hall: Rock N Roll (1998) - "Runaway (Demo)"
- Fire Woman: A Tribute to the Cult (2001) - "She Sells Sanctuary"
- A Tribute to Vai/Satriani: Lords of Karma (2002) - "Yankee Rose"
- Labour of Love: A Tribute to Life (2006) - "Outerspace"

== Related projects ==
=== Songs covered by other artists ===
- Sy Klopps Blues Band (1993) - Walter Ego - "Round and Round"
- The Tuesday Girls (1994) - When You're a Tuesday Girl - "Right By Your Side"
- James Young Group (1995) - Raised by Wolves - "Faith, Love and Hope"
- James Young Group (1995) - Raised by Wolves - "Amazing Grace"
- Nelson (1996) - Imaginator - "We're All Alright"
- The Wildhearts (1997) - "Anthem" (single) - "Time to Let You Go"
- Paul Gilbert (1998) - Flying Dog - "Girl Crazy"
- The Tuesdays (1998) - The Tuesdays - "Wheels"
- Lana Lane (2002) - Covers Collection - "Innocence"
- Richie Scarlet (2002) - The Insanity of Life - "Fly High Michelle"
- Paul Gilbert (2003) - Gilbert Hotel - "Time to Let You Go (Live)"
- Various Artists (2003) - A Tribute to Enuff Z'Nuff - 15 songs covered by 15 artists
- Malik Yusef (2009) - G.O.O.D. Morning, G.O.O.D. Night - "By Your Side"

=== Related music releases ===
- Needle Park - C'mon Get Real (2002)
  Donnie Vie lead vocals on "When It All Comes Around" and "Take Me Back"
- Donnie Vie - Just Enough! - (2003)
  first Donnie Vie solo album, sometimes under the name Don E. Vie
- Various Artists - Influences & Connections: A Tribute to Mr. Big (2003)
  Donnie Vie lead vocals on "Green Tinted Sixties Mind"
- Don E. Vie - This & That (2004)
  limited release CD features Enuff Z'Nuff demos along with new solo material
- Drama Queen Die - Drama Queen Die (2004)
  Chip Z'Nuff and Ricky Parent play bass and drums on the full album
- Donnie Vie - DVieD-EP (2006)
  includes 5 song demo EP and history spanning DVD
- Donnie Vie - Extra Strength (2007)
  re-recordings of the Enuff Z'Nuff Strength album, mainly performed acoustically
- Various Artists - Sugar Boxx Soundtrack (2010)
  features the Johnnie Rotten Jr. songs "Yesterday" and "F*Marry*Kill"
- Adler's Appetite - "Alive", "Stardog", "Fading" (2010)
  Chip Z'Nuff is the bassist on these singles
- Johnnie Rotten Jr. - The Death of Harry Potter - (2010)
  Chip Z'Nuff solo album
- Johnny Monaco - "I Used to Be in Enuff Z'Nuff" (single) (2010)
  instrumental by Monaco with interview footage of Chip Z'Nuff sampled
- Liberty N' Justice - Chasing a Cure (2010)
  Donnie Vie lead vocals on "Throwing Stones"
- Donnie Vie - Wrapped Around My Middle Finger (2012)
  second full-length Donnie Vie solo album
- Liberty N' Justice - The Cigar Chronicles (2012)
  Donnie Vie lead vocals on "Madhatter"
- Primitive Overflow - Honor Way Down (2012)
  Donnie Vie lead vocals on all songs
- Magic Eight Ball - Sorry We're Late But We're Worth the Wait (2013)
  Donnie Vie additional vocals on "Before It Was Murder (You Got Me Talking)"
- Adler Z'Nuff - S/T (2014)
  5-track digital EP with Chip Z'Nuff and Steven Adler
- Donnie Vie - The White Album (2014)
  third full-length Donnie Vie solo album
- Chip Z'Nuff - Strange Time (2015)
  first full-length Chip Z'Nuff solo album
- E-Z-N - Trouble Maker (Single) (2018)
  features former members Donnie Vie, Johnny Monaco, and Eric Donner
- Donnie Vie - Beautiful Things (2019)
  fourth full-length Donnie Vie solo album
- Donnie Vie - Party Time (Single) (2021)
  features Chip Z'Nuff on bass
- Chip Z'Nuff - Perfectly Imperfect (2022)
  Second full-length Chip Z'Nuff solo album

=== Filmography ===
- Sugar Boxx (2010) - Chip Z'Nuff as "Rybarski"
- Nowhere Fast: The Forgotten Story of Approach Control (cancelled) - Donnie Vie as "Donny"
