= List of Enuff Z'nuff members =

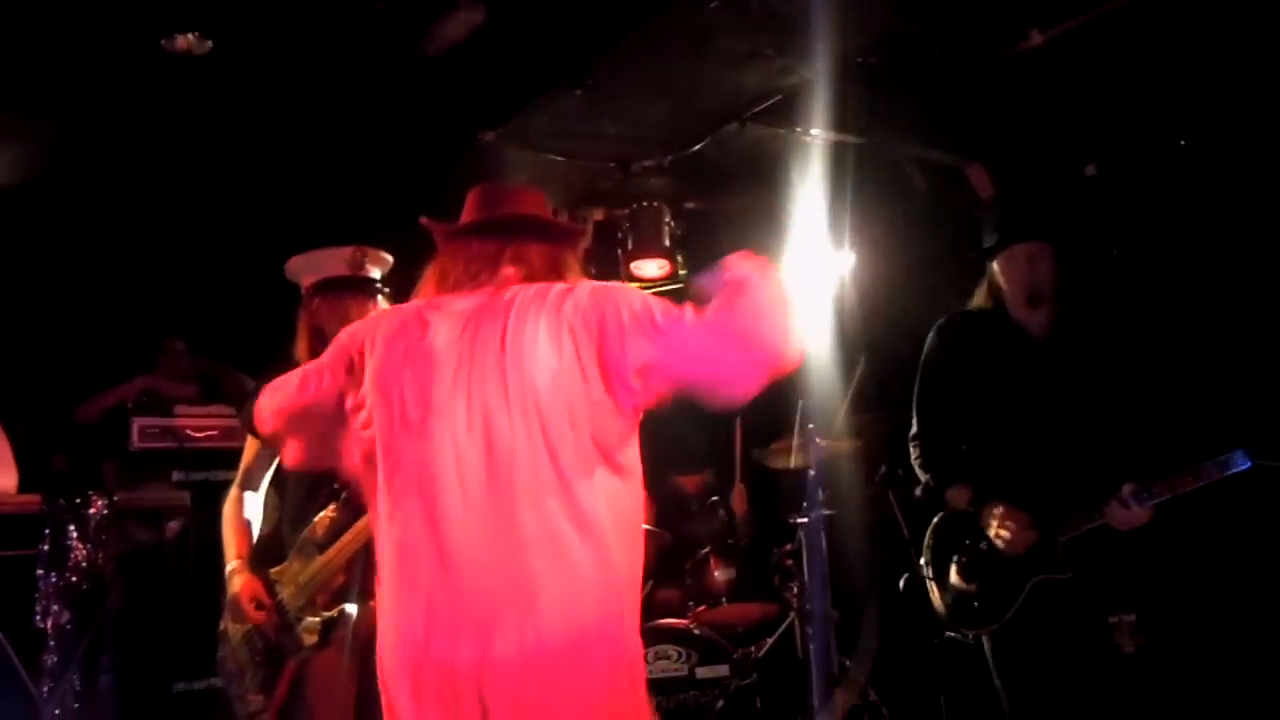
Enuff Z'Nuff in 2013.

Enuff Z'nuff is an American hard rock band from Blue Island, Illinois. Formed in 1984 with the spelling "Enuff z Nuff", the group originally included lead vocalist, rhythm guitarist, and keyboardist Donnie Vie (real name Donald Vandevelde), bassist, rhythm guitarist, and backing vocalist Chip Z'nuff (real name Gregory Rybarski), lead guitarist Gino Martino and drummer B.W. Boeski. Their current line-up includes Chip Z'nuff (as lead vocalist since 2016), guitarists Jason Camino (since 2023) and Luis Kalil (since 2025), and drummer Daxx Nielsen (since 2025).

== History ==
The group released its first demo, Hollywood Squares, in 1985. Martino left in 1987 and was briefly replaced by Pete Comita and later Alex Kane. By 1988, Kane and Boeski had been replaced by Derek Frigo and Vik "Vikki" Foxx, respectively. The band adopted the spelling "Enuff Z'nuff" and released its self-titled debut album in 1989. Strength and Animals with Human Intelligence followed in 1991 and 1993.

Shortly after recording was completed for Animals with Human Intelligence, Foxx left Enuff Z'nuff. and was replaced by Ricky Parent. After a disheartening performance at The Roxy Theatre in West Hollywood, Ca., the group was dropped by Arista Records and Derek Frigo also left the band. 1985 was released in 1994, featuring recordings from the band's original lineup. Original lead guitarist Gino Martino returned for 1995's Tweaked, before leaving again shortly after its release, leaving Vie, Z'nuff and Parent to record 1996's Peach Fuzz as a three-piece. Shortly after the album's release, Johnny Monaco joined Enuff Z'nuff in 1996 as the band's new lead guitarist. He also took over lead vocal duties when Vie left in 2002. The "classic lineup" of the band reunited to record ? in 2004. A full reunion was rumored, however Derek Frigo died on May 28 that year.

Later in 2004, Parent became unable to perform when he was diagnosed with cancer. He was initially replaced by Randi Scott, and later by Erik Donner, who remained until spring 2006. Chad Stewart and Greg Potter later filled in as temporary members, before Scott returned to the band. Parent later died as a result of his condition in October 2007. Johnny Monaco left the band as Vie returned in 2008, bringing new guitarist C.J. Szuter from his short-lived project, L.A. Smogg, for a few shows. Shortly after, Szuter was replaced by Tory Stoffregen. By May 2013, Vie again left the band with Johnny Monaco returning as the group's frontman. A year later, both Stoffregen and Scott left Enuff Z'nuff on "amicable terms", with Johnny Monaco and Z'nuff opting to continue as a three-piece with returning drummer Erik Donner.

Johnny Monaco left the band for a second time in January 2016 while Z'nuff signed a new recording contract without informing him. Z'nuff subsequently took over lead vocal duties, and the band released Clowns Lounge later in the year with returning members Stoffregen and Donner, plus new rhythm guitarist Tony Fenelle. By October, Donner had left again with Daniel Hill taking his place. The new lineup released its first album Diamond Boy in August 2018. In March 2019, Fenelle quit the band and was replaced by former member Alex Kane. Fennell returned in 2021, but left in 2023 and was replaced by Jason Camino. In late 2023, drummer Daniel B. Hill left the band.

Chris Densky subsequently joined as new drummer. In October 2024, Troy Stoffregen parted ways with the band, Luis Kalil replaced him as lead guitarist. In 2025, the band were joined by Daxx Nielson for recording.

== Members ==
=== Current ===
| Image | Name (real name) | Years active | Instruments | Release contributions |
|---|---|---|---|---|
| | Chip Z'nuff (Gregory Rybarski) | 1984–present | bass; rhythm guitar; vocals (all lead vocals since 2016) | all Enuff Z'nuff releases |
| | Jason Camino | 2023–present | guitars | Xtra Cherries (2025) |
| | Luis Kalil | 2025–present | guitars | Xtra Cherries (2025) |
| | Brentt Arcement | 2025-present | Drums | Xtra Cherries (2025) |

=== Former ===
| Image | Name (real name) | Years active | Instruments | Release contributions |
|---|---|---|---|---|
| | Donnie Vie (Donald Vandevelde) | 1984–2002; 2008–2013 | lead vocals; rhythm guitar; keyboards; harmonica | all Enuff Z'nuff releases from the Hollywood Squares demo (1985) to Clowns Lounge (2016); Brainwashed Generation (2020) – guest appearance on one track |
| | B.W. Boeski | 1984–1988 | drums | Hollywood Squares demo (1985); 1985 (1994) |
| | Gino Martino | 1984–1987; 1994–1995 | lead guitar | Hollywood Squares demo (1985); 1985 (1994); Tweaked (1995) |
| | Pete Comita | 1987 | lead guitar | none |
| | Alex Kane | 1987–1988; 2019–2021 | lead guitar; rhythm guitar (2019–2021) | Brainwashed Generation (2020) |
| | Derek Frigo | 1988–1994 (died 2004) | lead guitar; backing vocals | Enuff Z'nuff (1989); Strength (1991); Animals with Human Intelligence (1993); Tweaked (1995) – guest appearance on two tracks; Peach Fuzz (1996) – guest appearance on four tracks; Live (1998); ? (2004); One More for the Road (2005); Extended Versions (2006); Tonight, Sold Out (2008); Clowns Lounge (2016) |
| | Vik "Vikki" Foxx (Victor Cerny) | 1988–1992 | drums; rhythm guitar | Enuff Z'nuff (1989); Strength (1991); Animals with Human Intelligence (1993); Tweaked (1995) – guest appearance on one track; Peach Fuzz (1996) – guest appearance on one track; Live (1998); ? (2004); One More for the Road (2005); Extended Versions (2006); Tonight, Sold Out (2008); Clowns Lounge (2016) |
| | Ricky Parent | 1992–2004 (died 2007) | drums; percussion | all Enuff Z'nuff releases from Tweaked (1995) to Welcome to Blue Island (2003) |
| | Johnny Monaco | 1996–2008; 2013–2016 | lead guitar; vocals (lead vocals 2002–08 and 2013–16) | all Enuff Z'nuff releases from Seven (1997) to Welcome to Blue Island (2003) |
| | Randi Scott | 2004 (touring); 2006–2014 | drums | none |
| | Erik Donner | 2004–2006; 2014–2016 | drums; percussion; backing vocals | Covered in Gold (2014); Clowns Lounge (2016) |
| | C.J. Szuter | 2008 | lead guitar | none |
| | Tory Stoffregen | 2008–2014; 2016–2024 | lead guitar; backing vocals | Clowns Lounge (2016); Diamond Boy (2018); Brainwashed Generation (2020) |
| | Tony Fennell | 2016–2019; 2021–2023 | rhythm guitar; keyboards; backing vocals | Clowns Lounge (2016); Diamond Boy (2018); Brainwashed Generation (2020) – guest appearance on one track |
| | Daniel B. Hill | 2016–2023 | drums | Diamond Boy (2018); Brainwashed Generation (2020) |
| | Chris Densky | 2024–2025 | drums | none |

=== Touring ===
| Image | Name (real name) | Years active | Instruments | Release contributions |
|---|---|---|---|---|
| | Chad Stewart | 2006 | drums; backing vocals | Stewart and Potter each filled in on drums for the band following Ricky Parent's forced retirement. |
| | Greg Potter | 2006 | drums | Stewart and Potter each filled in on drums for the band following Ricky Parent's forced retirement. |
| | Dakota Denman | 2016 | lead guitar | Denman and Ramone substituted for Tory Stoffregen, who was unable to play a few shows, in 2016. |
| | Steve Ramone | 2016 | lead guitar | Denman and Ramone substituted for Tory Stoffregen, who was unable to play a few shows, in 2016. |
| | Jack Ivins | 2024 | drums | |

== Lineups ==
| Period | Members | Releases |
|---|---|---|
| 1984–1987 | Donnie Vie – vocals, rhythm guitar, keyboards; Gino Martino – lead guitar; Chip Z'nuff – bass, rhythm guitar, vocals; B.W. Boeski – drums | Hollywood Squares demo (1985); 1985 (1994) |
| 1987 | Donnie Vie – vocals, rhythm guitar, keyboards; Pete Comita – lead guitar; Chip Z'nuff – bass, rhythm guitar, vocals; B.W. Boeski – drums | none |
| 1987–1988 | Donnie Vie – vocals, rhythm guitar, keyboards; Alex Kane – lead guitar; Chip Z'nuff – bass, rhythm guitar, vocals; B.W. Boeski – drums | none |
| 1988–1992 | Donnie Vie – vocals, rhythm guitar, keyboards; Derek Frigo – lead guitar, backing vocals; Chip Z'nuff – bass, rhythm guitar, vocals; Vikki Foxx – drums | Enuff Z'nuff (1989); Strength (1991); Animals with Human Intelligence (1993); Live (1998); ? (2004); Tonight, Sold Out (2008); Clowns Lounge (2016) |
| 1992–1994 | Donnie Vie – vocals, rhythm guitar, keyboards; Derek Frigo – lead guitar, backing vocals; Chip Z'nuff – bass, rhythm guitar, vocals; Ricky Parent – drums, percussion | none |
| 1994–1995 | Donnie Vie – vocals, rhythm guitar, keyboards; Gino Martino – lead guitar; Chip Z'nuff – bass, rhythm guitar, vocals; Ricky Parent – drums, percussion | Tweaked (1995) |
| 1995–1996 | Donnie Vie – vocals, guitars, keyboards; Chip Z'nuff – bass, guitars, vocals; Ricky Parent – drums, percussion | Peach Fuzz (1996) |
| 1996–2002 | Donnie Vie – vocals, rhythm guitar, keyboards; Johnny Monaco – lead guitar, vocals; Chip Z'nuff – bass, rhythm guitar, vocals; Ricky Parent – drums, percussion | Seven (1997); Paraphernalia (1998); 10 (2000); Welcome to Blue Island (2003) |
| 2002–2004 | Johnny Monaco – vocals, lead guitar; Chip Z'nuff – bass, rhythm guitar, vocals; Ricky Parent – drums, percussion | none |
| 2004 | Johnny Monaco – vocals, lead guitar; Chip Z'nuff – bass, rhythm guitar, vocals; Randi Scott – drums (touring only) | none |
| Late 2004 – mid-2006 | Johnny Monaco – vocals, lead guitar; Chip Z'nuff – bass, rhythm guitar, vocals; Erik Donner – drums, backing vocals | none |
| Mid-2006 | Johnny Monaco – vocals, lead guitar; Chip Z'nuff – bass, rhythm guitar, vocals; Chad Stewart – drums, backing vocals (touring) | none |
| Late 2006 | Johnny Monaco – vocals, lead guitar; Chip Z'nuff – bass, rhythm guitar, vocals; Greg Potter – drums (touring) | none |
| Late 2006 – early 2008 | Johnny Monaco – vocals, lead guitar; Chip Z'nuff – bass, rhythm guitar, vocals; Randi Scott – drums | none |
| Early – late 2008 | Donnie Vie – vocals, rhythm guitar, keyboards; C.J. Szuter – lead guitar, backing vocals; Chip Z'nuff – bass, rhythm guitar, vocals; Randi Scott – drums | none |
| Late 2008 – May 2013 | Donnie Vie – vocals, rhythm guitar, keyboards; Tory Stoffregen – lead guitar, backing vocals; Chip Z'nuff – bass, rhythm guitar, vocals; Randi Scott – drums | Dissonance (2009) (does not feature Stoffregen or Scott) |
| May 2013 – May 2014 | Johnny Monaco – vocals, lead guitar; Tory Stoffregen – lead guitar, backing vocals; Chip Z'nuff – bass, rhythm guitar, vocals; Randi Scott – drums | none |
| June 2014 – April 2016 | Johnny Monaco – vocals, lead guitar; Chip Z'nuff – bass, rhythm guitar, vocals; Erik Donner – drums, percussion, backing vocals | Covered in Gold (2014) |
| April – October 2016 | Chip Z'nuff – vocals, bass, rhythm guitar; Tory Stoffregen – lead guitar, backing vocals; Tony Fenelle – rhythm and lead guitar, backing vocals; Erik Donner – drums, percussion, backing vocals | Clowns Lounge (2016) |
| October 2016 – March 2019 | Chip Z'nuff – vocals, bass, rhythm guitar; Tory Stoffregen – lead guitar, backing vocals; Tony Fenelle – rhythm and lead guitar, backing vocals; Daniel B. Hill – drums, percussion | Diamond Boy (2018) |
| March 2019 – November 2021 | Chip Z'nuff – vocals, bass, rhythm guitar; Tory Stoffregen – lead guitar, backing vocals; Alex Kane – rhythm and lead guitar; Daniel B. Hill – drums, percussion | Brainwashed Generation (2020) |
| November 2021 – July 2023 | Chip Z'nuff – vocals, bass, rhythm guitar; Tory Stoffregen – lead guitar, backing vocals; Tony Fenelle – rhythm and lead guitar, backing vocals; Daniel B. Hill – drums, percussion | none |
| July 2023 – late 2023 | Chip Z'nuff – vocals, bass, rhythm guitar; Tory Stoffregen – lead guitar, backing vocals; Jason Camino – rhythm and lead guitar; Daniel B. Hill – drums, percussion | none |
| January – October 2024 | Chip Z'nuff – vocals, bass, rhythm guitar; Tory Stoffregen – lead guitar, backing vocals; Jason Camino – rhythm and lead guitar; Chris Densky – drums, percussion | none |
| November 2024 – May 2025 | Chip Z'nuff – vocals, bass, rhythm guitar; Jason Camino – guitars; Chris Densky – drums, percussion | none |
| May – June 2025 | Chip Z'nuff – vocals, bass, rhythm guitar; Luis Kalil – lead and rhythm guitar; Jason Camino – rhythm and lead guitar; Chris Densky – drums, percussion | none |
| June 2025 – present | Chip Z'nuff – vocals, bass, rhythm guitar; Luis Kalil – lead and rhythm guitar; Jason Camino – rhythm and lead guitar; Daxx Nielsen – drums, percussion | Xtra Cherries (2025) |
