= Chip Z'Nuff =

American heavy metal musician

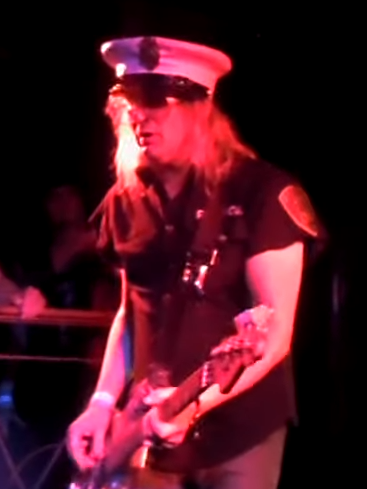
Chip Z'Nuff, 2013

Chip Z'Nuff (real name Gregory Rybarski) is an American glam rock musician. Z'Nuff has been the bassist and rhythm guitarist for Enuff Z'Nuff since 1984, and is the only consistent original member. He was born in Chicago, Illinois. Chip formed Enuff Z'Nuff with lead vocalist, rhythm guitarist, and keyboardist Donnie Vie, lead guitarist Gino Martino and drummer B.W. Boeski. The band charted two times on the US Hot 100; "New Thing" (1989), and "Fly High Michelle" (1990).

From 2005 to 2011, Chip was the bassist for Adler's Appetite. Chip had left the band between March 2006 and 2007, before he was rehired. Z'Nuff left Adler's Appetite in September 2011.

Since 2015, Chip has been working in the side project ZFM, along with members from Bang Tango, Kik Tracee, Enuff Z'Nuff, Flipp, and Fear Factory. The single "Poppy" was released in May 2025 with the album anthology announced for a July release.

Z'Nuff has released two solo albums, including his 2022 album Perfectly Imperfect. Chip has used many different bass guitars on stage, including a twelve-string bass.

Z'Nuff's bands are:

- Enuff Z'Nuff (1984–present)
- Adler's Appetite (2005–March 2006, 2007–September 2011)
- ZFM (2015–present)
