= It's Up to You =

It's Up to You may refer to:

- It's Up to You (film), a 1936 crime drama film directed by Christy Cabanne
- "It's Up to You" (Ricky Nelson song), 1962
- It's Up to You (Al Dexter song), 1946
- It's Up to You (The Tuesdays song), 1998
- "It's Up to You!", a 2001 song by The Brilliant Green from the album Los Angeles
- It's Up to You (album), a 1993 album by Girlfriend
- "It's Up to You", a song by Cheap Trick from the 1986 album The Doctor
- "It's Up to You", a song by punk rock band Pennywise from the 2001 album Land of the Free?
- "It's Up to You", a song by John Denver from his 1974 album Back Home Again
