= Seven (Enuff Z'nuff album) =

Studio album by Enuff Z'nuff
- Released: September 30, 1994 (as Brothers; Japan); February 18, 1997 (as Seven; United States)
- Recorded: 1993–1994
- Studios: Chicago Recording Company, Mindscape Studios, Chicago, Groovemaster, Evergreen Park, Illinois
- Genres: Power pop, hard rock
- Length: 61:29
- Labels: Far East Metal Syndicate (Japan); Mayhem (US); Music for Nations (UK)
- Producers: Chip Z'nuff and Donnie Vie

Enuff Z'nuff chronology
Peach Fuzz (1996)	Seven (1994)	Paraphernalia (1999)

Singles from Seven
- 1. "Wheels" Released: 1997

Professional ratings
Review scores
Source	Rating
AllMusic	3/5 stars

Seven is the 7th studio album by American rock band Enuff Z'Nuff, which was originally released in Japan as Brothers under the band name Chip & Donnie in 1994. Seven was initially intended to form one half of a double-album for the Japanese market, paired with the record that would eventually become the album Tweaked. The sessions were split into two separate discs, with the pop sounding Brothers album getting re-branded as an Enuff Z'nuff album in 1997 for its US release. As well as the re-titling and new artwork, Seven contains two bonus tracks not available on the original Brothers CD.

On Seven, the band adopted a more acoustic sound compared to Tweaked, which may be seen as its heavier counterpart. Several tracks on the album are also significant to the band's history:

"Down Hill" is thought by lead singer Donnie Vie to possibly contain late guitarist Derek Frigo's last studio recorded solo with the band. "You and I" was played by Donnie Vie at bassist Chip Z’nuff's wedding reception. "It’s No Good," an acoustic concert staple, was later re-recorded by and featured on Donnie Vie's solo album, Extra Strength. Other notable tracks are the lead single "Wheels," which was covered in 1998 by Arista recording artists The Tuesdays and the John Lennon cover "Jealous Guy". Liner notes for the album were written by Rolling Stone editor, David Wild.

Causing some confusion, Seven was later re-released in the US under its original Japanese title Brothers, featuring new artwork and the Enuff Z'Nuff name. The Brothers re-issue is the same as the original Chip & Donnie Japanese release of 1994, meaning the bonus tracks from Seven are no longer present.

== Track listing ==
All songs by Donnie Vie, except where indicated

1. "Wheels" (Vie, Chip Z'Nuff) – 4:32
2. "Still Have Tonight" – 3:47
3. "Down Hill" – 4:44
4. "It’s No Good" – 3:42
5. "5 Smiles Away" – 3:18
6. "L.A. Burning" (Vie, Z'nuff) – 3:03
7. "New Kind of Motion" (Vie, Z'nuff) – 3:16
8. "Clown on the Town" – 4:26
9. "You And I" – 4:35
10. "On My Way Back Home" – 4:40
11. "We Don't Have to Be Friends" (Vie, Z'nuff) – 4:05
12. "So Sad to See You" – 4:41
13. "Jealous Guy" (John Lennon) – 4:06 (bonus track)
14. "For You Girl" – 3:26 (US bonus track)
15. "I Won't Let You Go" – 4:02 (US bonus track)

== Personnel ==
Enuff Z'Nuff

- Donnie Vie – lead vocals, guitars and keyboards
- Chip Z'Nuff – bass guitar, guitars and vocals
- Johnny Monaco – lead guitar (credited on 1997 edition but didn't perform)
- Ricky Parent – drums

Additional musicians

- Derek Frigo (alias Kurt Fang) – lead guitar (tracks 1, 2, 3, 8 & 10)
- Eugene Strentz (Gino Martino) – lead guitar (track 9)
- Bruce Breckenfield – Hammond B-3 organ
- Greg Errico – drums
- Mars Williams – saxophone
- Johnny Frigo – violin
- The Party Girls – background vocals (track 7)

Production

- Chris Shepard – recording & mixing
- Phil Bonanno, Stefon Taylor, Dan Stout, Chris Demonk, Don Grayless, Bub Phillipe, Johnny K, Jeff Lane, Joshua Shapard, Jim Hoffman – additional engineering
- Jeff Lane, Kevin Hayes, Dan Stout, Claudine Pontier, Tom Lipnick – assistant engineers
- Eric Gast – additional mixing
- Brian Lee – mastering

== Release history ==
Country	Release date
Japan	September 30, 1994
United States	February 18, 1997
