= Chris Steinmetz =

American record producer

Chris Steinmetz (born 1966) is a record producer and engineer living in Chicago. He is president of Stonecutter Records.

== Biography ==
=== Early life ===
Chris Steinmetz was born in 1966 to Kenneth and Virginia Steinmetz in Barrington, Illinois. He began playing guitar at age 12 and played in bands throughout high school. It was during this time that Steinmetz first became interested in audio engineering. While playing a show one night, he was struck by the lower quality of his band's sound compared to the headliners. Despite his newfound interest in audio, Steinmetz entered the University of Utah majoring in biomedical engineering upon graduating high school. However, the call to music proved too strong and a year later Steinmetz dropped out and moved to Los Angeles to pursue a career in the recording industry.

=== Recording career ===
Steinmetz career in LA took off quickly as he spent his first three sessions working with Paul Simon, John Denver, and David Lee Roth. Within a year, engineer Michael Wagener took notice of Steinmetz and hired him to engineer many classic 80s hard rock albums for his label. During his time in LA, Steinmetz also did freelance work for many other bands as well as for some feature films.

In 1996, Steinmetz moved back to his native Chicago to be closer to family. He began freelancing at Chicago Recording Company, Chicago Trax, and Terry Fryer Music. Provided with access to Chicago's growing rap music scene, Steinmetz' normal clientele began to shift from hard rock to hip hop. Between 2004 and 2006 six alone, he received credits on albums by Kanye West, Twista, Lil Jon, Usher, E-dub, and Jin with all six going platinum or gold. During this time, Steinmetz also helped to pioneer the field of music mixing in 5.1.

=== Stonecutter Records ===
Chris Steinmetz created his own label, Stonecutter Records, in 2006 out of the desire to "advance [artists] to the next level in their careers and get them the exposure they deserve." The label's first project, Acoustic Chicago, is a compilation of 13 Chicago artists and features their music in an acoustic format to highlight songwriting ability.

=== Stonecutter Recording Studios ===
In 2012, Steinmetz opened Stonecutter Recording Studios. Located in the south loop of Chicago, it is a recording facility providing recording, mixing, mastering, marketing and production.

== Partial discography ==
Artist	Project	Year	Credit
Jealous Bone	Reason to Stay LP	2020	Producer, Engineer, Mixing, Mastering
Alice Drinks the Kool Aid	Mojo	2020	Producer, Engineer, Mixing, Mastering
Alice Drinks the Kool Aid	Stayin' Home	2020	Producer, Engineer, Mixing, Mastering
Ego Mechanics	Moonlight Dies	2019	Producer, Engineer, Mixing, Mastering
Radio Free Honduras	Suavecito	2019	Producer, Engineer, Mixing, Mastering
Radio Free Honduras	Dulce y Delicada	2019	Producer, Engineer, Mixing, Mastering
cupcakKe	Bird Box	2019	Producer, Engineer, Mixing, Mastering
cupcakKe	Squidward Nose	2019	Producer, Engineer, Mixing, Mastering
cupcakKe	Whoregasm	2019	Producer, Engineer, Mixing, Mastering
Straight Skinny	My Intentions	2019	Producer, Engineer, Mixing, Mastering
Straight Skinny	Voodoo	2019	Producer, Engineer, Mixing, Mastering
cupcakKe	Exit	2018	Producer, Engineer, Mixing, Mastering
cupcakKe	Cartoons	2018	Producer, Engineer, Mixing, Mastering
Enuff Z'Nuff	Metalheart	2018	Producer, Engineer, Mixing, Mastering
cupcakKe	Quiz	2018	Producer, Engineer, Mixing, Mastering
cupcakKe	Spoiled Milk Titties	2018	Producer, Engineer, Mixing, Mastering
Jerason Dean	Only the Lonely	2018	Producer, Engineer, Mixing, Mastering
cupcakKe	Duck Duck Goose	2018	Producer, Engineer, Mixing, Mastering
Manwolves	A Safety Meeting LP	2018	Producer, Engineer, Mixing, Mastering
Kay Soul	As I Am	2017	Producer, Engineer, Mixing, Mastering
Charli XCX, cupcakKe, Pabllo Vittar, Brooke Candy	I Got It	2017	Producer, Engineer, Mixing, Mastering
Fools' Brew	Up in Flames	2016	Producer, Engineer, Mixing, Mastering
Fools' Brew	God'll Cut It Down	2016	Producer, Engineer, Mixing, Mastering
The Ex Senators	Stay	2012	Producer, Engineer, Mixing, Mastering
Brent Brown	Belladonna Lily	2010	Producer, Engineer, Mixing, Mastering
Black Eyed Peas	Live: Staple Center	2010	Mixing
Trio Globo	Steering by the Stars	2010	Engineer, Producer, Mixing, Mastering
Lovehammers	Driving Blind	2009	Producer, Engineer, Mixing, Mastering
Jen Porter	Discarded	2009	Producer, Engineer, Mixing, Mastering
Jen Porter	Closer to the Surface	2009	Producer, Engineer, Mixing, Mastering
Denise Brigham	Hotel Lafayette	2009	Engineer, Mixing, Orchestral Arrangements, Producer
Howard Levy	Acoustic Chicago	2008	Producer, Engineer, Mixing, Mastering
Rihanna	Disturbia	2008	Producer, Engineer, Mixing, Mastering
Marty Casey, Lovehammers	Marty Casey & Lovehammers LP	2008	Producer, Engineer, Mixing, Mastering
Donald Lawrence	Matthew 28 Greatest Hits	2008	Engineer
Enuff Z'nuff	Greatest Hits(Deluxe Edition)	2008	Mixing
KR Morales	Come Get It	2008	Mastering, Mixing
David McMillan	Heartsteady	2008	Engineer
Syleena Johnson	Chapter 4: Labor Pains	2008	Mixing
Vince Agwada	Eyes of the City	2008	Mixing
OneRepublic	Control Room	2008	Mixing
Syleena Johnson	Chapter 4: Labor Pains	2008	Mixing
Sarah Potenza	Acoustic Chicago	2007	Producer, Engineer, Mixing, Mastering
Rihanna	Good Girl Gone Bad	2007	Engineer
The Smashing Pumpkins	Control Room	2007	Mixing
Kanye West	Alicia Keys Remix	2007	Engineer, Mixing
Feist	Control Room	2007	Mixing
Jay-Z	Control Room	2007	Mixing
Heather Headley & Andrea Bocelli	Live in Italy	2007	Engineer
John Cooper Jazz Orchestra	John Cooper Jazz Orchestra	2007	Engineer, Mixing
Jimmy Buffett	Live	2007	Engineer
Sones de Mexico	Esta Tierra Tuya	2007	Engineer, Mixing
Queen Latifah	Hairspray	2007	Engineer, Mixing
Fantasia	The Color Purple	2007	Engineer
Various Artists	Acoustic Chicago	2007	Producer, Engineer, Mixing
Styx	iTunes Live	2006	Engineer
Jay-Z	Live Show	2006	Engineer
Kanye West & Jamie Foxx	One Night Extravaganza	2006	Engineer
Lovehammers	Marty Casey & Lovehammers	2006	Engineer, Mixing
Twista	Kamikaze	2004	Engineer, Mixing
Lil' Jon & the East Side Boyz	Crunk Juice	2004	Engineer
Usher	Confessions	2004	Engineer
E-Dub	Prezident	2004	Engineer
Enuff Z'Nuff	?	2004	Mixing
Rival	State of Mind	2004	Producer, Engineer
Jin	The Rest is History	2004	Engineer
Tori Amos	Mona Lisa Smile	2003	Engineer
Ben Harper	Q101 Live	2003	Engineer
Enuff Z'Nuff	Welcome To Blue Island	2003	Engineer, Mixing
Disturbed	Live in London	2003	Engineer
Mickey Hart	Best of Mickey Hart: Over the Edge	2002	Engineer
Rod Stewart	It Had to Be You: The Great American Songbook	2002	Engineer
Common	Electric Circus	2002	Engineer, Assistant
Kiss	Box Set: Special Edition	2001	Engineer
Limp Bizkit	End of Days Soundtrack		Engineer, Mixing
Madonna	Ray of Light Live		Engineer, Mixing
Nas & R. Kelly	Street Dreams		Engineer, Mixing
Crucial Conflict	Good Side, Bad Side		Engineer
Kiss	Revenge		Engineer
Alice in Chains	Live Facelift		Engineer, Mixing
Suicidal Tendencies	Lights...Camera...Revolution!		Engineer
White Lion	Big Game		Engineer
B. B. King	King of Blues:1989		Assistant Engineer
Faster Pussycat	Faster Pussycat	1987	Assistant Engineer
Miles Davis	Music from Siesta		Assistant Engineer
Paul Simon	Graceland		Assistant
