= Jacqueline Scott filmography =

American television, film, & theatre actress (1931-2020)

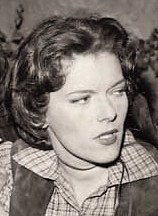
Scott in the TV series Bat Masterson, episode '"The Black Pearls" (1959).

This is the filmography of actress Jacqueline Scott (June 25, 1931 – July 23, 2020). She appeared in over 100 feature films, television series, and on the Broadway stage between 1956 and 2009. She performed in Western, drama, and science fiction genres.

== Film and TV appearances ==
=== 1950s ===
- 1956: Armstrong Circle Theatre (TV Series) as Emese Iszak
- 1957: The Kaiser Aluminum Hour (TV Series) as Donna / Ruth Asher
- 1957: Navy Log (TV Series) as WAC / Celia
- 1957: Robert Montgomery Presents (TV Series) as Toni Warden
- 1958: Mike Hammer (TV Series) as Vivian Banner
- 1958: The Loretta Young Show (TV Series) as Diane Warrington
- 1958: Matinee Theatre (TV Series)
- 1958: State Trooper (TV Series) as Betty Landers
- 1958: Steve Canyon (TV Series) as Pat Hammer
- 1958: Macabre as Polly Baron - Nurse
- 1958: Flight (TV Series)
- 1958: 77 Sunset Strip (TV Series) as Nancy Devere
- 1958: The Sheriff of Cochise (TV Series)
- 1958, 1959, 1960: Perry Mason (TV Series) as Kathi Beecher / Sally Wilson / Amelia Armitage
- 1958, 1960: U.S. Marshal (TV Series) as Doris Reeves / Mrs. Ben Tyler / Joan
- 1958, 1959, 1960, 1963: Have Gun - Will Travel (TV Series) – Various roles, 5 episodes
- 1959: Zane Grey Theatre (TV Series) as Jenny Carter
- 1959: Schlitz Playhouse (TV Series)
- 1959: Bat Masterson (TV Series) as Teresa Renault / Carol Otis
- 1959: Richard Diamond, Private Detective (TV Series) as Jan Smith
- 1959, 1960: Goodyear Theatre (TV Series) as Helen Morris / Ann Harper
- 1959–1972: Gunsmoke – Various roles, 8 episodes

=== 1960s ===
- 1960: Johnny Midnight (TV Series) as Lynn
- 1961: Dante (TV Series) as Helen Rogers
- 1961: The Life and Legend of Wyatt Earp (TV Series) as Beth Grover
- 1961: The Detectives (TV Series) as Mrs. Halstead
- 1961: Cain's Hundred (TV Series) as Helen
- 1961: Target: The Corruptors (TV Series)
- 1961, 1962: Adventures in Paradise (TV Series) as Adrian Crandall / Betts Forbes
- 1961, 1968: Lassie (TV Series) as Miss Ridgeway / Cora Young
- 1962: Route 66 (TV Series) as Midge Duran
- 1962: Alcoa Premiere (TV Series) as Oralee Dunlap
- 1962: House of Women as Mrs. Stevens
- 1962: Wide Country (TV Series) as Ella Bennett
- 1962: The Virginian (TV Series) as Melissa Tatum
- 1962: Stoney Burke (TV Series) as Leora Dawson
- 1962, 1963: Laramie (TV Series) as Ellen / Stacey Bishop / Francie
- 1962, 1964, 1965: Bonanza (TV Series) as Joy Dexter (S7 E13 "A Natural Wizard") / Willa Cord / Kathie
- 1963: Ben Casey (TV Series) as Ruth Stratton
- 1963: The Twilight Zone (TV Series) as Helen Gaines
- 1963: G.E. True (TV Series) as Gloria Price
- 1963: The Untouchables (TV Series) as Lorna Shaw
- 1963: The Alfred Hitchcock Hour (TV Series) (Season 2 Episode 3: "Terror at Northfield") as Susan Marsh
- 1963: The Eleventh Hour (TV Series) as Florence Green
- 1963: Temple Houston (TV Series) as Kate Hagadorn
- 1963: Channing (TV Series) as Irene Kobitz
- 1963, 1964: The Outer Limits (TV Series) as Dr. Alicia Hendrix / Carol Maxwell
- 1964: The Great Adventure (TV Series) as Eliza Waterhouse
- 1964–1967: The Fugitive (TV Series) as Donna Kimble Taft (Recurring role, 5 episodes)
- 1966: Run for Your Life (TV Series) as Dorothy Baker
- 1966, 1972, 1973: The F.B.I. (TV Series) – Various roles, 4 episodes
- 1967, 1972: Insight (TV Series) as Anne / Meg Anderson
- 1968: Firecreek as Henrietta Cobb
- 1969: The Guns of Will Sonnett (TV Series) as Emily Damon
- 1969: Judd for the Defense (TV Series) as Leigh Dawes / Beth Stratton
- 1969: Here Come the Brides (TV Series) as Linda
- 1969: Death of a Gunfighter as Laurie Mills

=== 1970s ===
- 1970: Smoke (TV Movie) as Fran Fitch
- 1970: CBS Playhouse (TV Series) as Cassie
- 1970: Mission: Impossible (TV Series) as Cynthia Owens
- 1970: The Immortal (TV Series) as Alpha Henderson
- 1970: Men at Law (TV Series) as Dixie Hines
- 1971: The New Dick Van Dyke Show (TV Series) as Sister Bernadette
- 1971: Duel (TV Movie) as Mrs. Mann
- 1971: Marcus Welby, M.D. (TV Series) as Mariam Garsen
- 1972: Cannon (TV Series) as Sally Dixon
- 1972: Owen Marshall, Counselor at Law (TV Series) as Elaine Andrews
- 1972, 1973: Ironside (TV Series) as April Morris / Felice Evans
- 1972, 1974: The Streets of San Francisco (TV Series) as Nina Shaffer / Emily Rankin
- 1973: The Rookies (TV Series) as Rita King
- 1973: Charley Varrick as Nadine
- 1973: The New Perry Mason (TV Series) as Arlene Pagan
- 1973: Outrage (TV Movie) as Mrs. Chandler
- 1974: Medical Center (TV Series) as Lorilei
- 1974: Planet of the Apes (TV Series) as Kira / Zantes
- 1975: Lucas Tanner (TV Series) as Ardis Leversee
- 1975, 1976, 1978: Barnaby Jones (TV Series) as Verna Compton / Gwen Reynolds / Mrs. Albin
- 1976: Starsky & Hutch (TV Series) as Evelyn Rankin
- 1976: The Blue Knight (TV Series) as Ida
- 1977: The Ghost of Cypress Swamp (TV Movie) as Aunt Louise
- 1977: Empire of the Ants as Margaret Ellis
- 1977: Telefon as Mrs. Hassler
- 1978: CHiPs (TV Series) as Ethyl
- 1978: Police Woman (TV Series) as Kathleen
- 1979: How the West Was Won (TV Series) as Mrs. Ferguson
- 1979: Salvage 1 (TV Series) as Lorene

=== 1980s ===
- 1981: A Matter of Life and Death (TV Movie) as Sally Lyons
- 1981: Trapper John, M.D. (TV Series) as Ellie Ryker
- 1981: Vega$ (TV Series) as Louise Cornell
- 1982: Code Red (TV Series) as Mrs. Willis
- 1982: Jinxed! as Woman Bettor
- 1983: Lottery! (TV Series) as Molly
- 1984: Riptide (TV Series) as Wanda Wise
- 1985: Crazy Like a Fox (TV Series) as Margaret
- 1987: The Bold and the Beautiful (TV Series) as Ruth Wilson (Recurring role, 4 episodes)
- 1987: L.A. Law (TV Series) as Mrs. Crawford

=== 1990s ===
- 1991: Equal Justice (TV Series) as Judge Naisbett
- 1991: Switched at Birth (TV Mini-Series) as Ruth Mays

=== 2000s ===
- 2004: Cold Case (TV Series) as Sally Bower (2003)
- 2009: Sugar Boxx as Irene Guilly
