= Johnny K =

American record producer

- Born: John Karkazis; Chicago, Illinois, U.S.
- Genres: Rock
- Occupations: Producer; engineer; mixer

John Karkazis, better known as Johnny K, is an American record producer, engineer and mixer best known for his work with Disturbed, Staind, 3 Doors Down and Plain White T's. Karkazis was Grammy nominated for Producer of the Year in 2008.. Records produced by Karkazis have sold over 20 million copies in the United States. After building his career in Chicago, Karkazis relocated in Nashville in 2022.

== Album credits ==
Album	Year	Band	Credits
Tweaked	1995	Enuff Z'Nuff	Engineered
Peach Fuzz	1996	Enuff Z'Nuff	Mixed and Engineered
Running with Scissors	1996	The Orphan Punks	Produced, engineered and mixed
The Lost Demos	1996	Moreno	Produced, engineered and mixed
Seven	1997	Enuff Z'Nuff	Engineered
Music Saves	1998	Big Wow	Engineered and mixed
Paraphernalia	1999	Enuff Z'Nuff	Engineered
The Sickness	2000	Disturbed	Produced and engineered
10	2000	Enuff Z'Nuff	Mixed
Healing	2001	Ünloco	Produced, engineered and mixed
No One	2001	No One	Produced, engineered and mixed
Scars	2001	SOiL	Produced and engineered
Supercharger	2001	Machine Head	Produced and engineered
Believe	2002	Disturbed	Produced and engineered
Finger Eleven	2003	Finger Eleven	Produced, engineered and mixed
XIII	2003	Mushroomhead	Produced and engineered
Redefine	2004	SOiL	Produced and engineered
Two	2004	Earshot	Produced and engineered
Desensitized	2004	Drowning Pool	Produced and engineered
Seventeen Days	2005	3 Doors Down	Produced and engineered
Ten Thousand Fists	2005	Disturbed	Produced and engineered
Until There's Nothing Left of Us	2006	Kill Hannah	Produced, engineered and mixed
Every Second Counts	2006	Plain White T's	Produced, engineered and mixed
Them vs. You vs. Me	2007	Finger Eleven	Produced, engineered and mixed
Light From Above	2008	Black Tide	Produced, engineered and mixed
3 Doors Down	2008	3 Doors Down	Produced and engineered
The Illusion of Progress	2008	Staind	Produced and engineered
Big Bad World	2008	Plain White T's	Produced and engineered
Adelitas Way	2009	Adelitas Way	Produced and engineered
Picture Perfect	2009	SOiL	Produced
Cold Day Memory	2010	Sevendust	Produced, engineered and mixed
Welcome To The Wasteland	2010	Bad City	Produced and mixed
No Apologies	2010	Trapt	Produced, engineered and mixed
No Guts. No Glory.	2010	Airbourne	Produced
War of Angels	2011	Pop Evil	Produced, engineered and mixed
Staind	2011	Staind	Produced, engineered and mixed
Thirteen	2011	Megadeth	Produced, engineered and mixed
Red Lamb	2012	Red Lamb	Mixed
Nonpoint	2012	Nonpoint	Produced, engineered and mixed
Super Collider	2013	Megadeth	Produced and mixed
Saint Asonia	2015	Saint Asonia	Produced, engineered and mixed
Using You	2015	Mars Argo	Produced
Getaway	2016	Adelitas Way	Produced
Stormchasers	2017	Lucky Boys Confusion	Produced
The Beast Inside	2017	My Enemies & I	Produced
Notorious	2017	Adelitas Way	Produced and mixed
Sunshine	2020	The Black Moods	Produced
Plush	2021	Plush	Produced and mixed
