= Peach Fuzz (album) =

Studio album by Enuff Z'nuff
- Released: January 19, 1996
- Recorded: 1990–1991, 1993–1995
- Studios: A&M Studios and Music Grinder, Hollywood, California; Mindscape Studios, Chicago, Z'nuff Towers, Beverly, Star Trax, Crestwood, Groove Master Studios, Evergreen Park, Illinois
- Genres: Hard rock, glam metal, power pop
- Length: 42:27
- Label: Big Deal / Caroline
- Producers: Chip Z'Nuff, Donnie Vie

Enuff Z'nuff chronology
| Tweaked (1995) | Peach Fuzz (1996) | Seven (1997) |

Professional ratings
Review scores
| Source | Rating |
|---|---|
| AllMusic | 3/5 stars |
| Collector's Guide to Heavy Metal | 7/10 |
| Kerrang! | 3/5 stars |

Peach Fuzz is the sixth studio album from the American rock band Enuff Z'Nuff. Like the band's 1994 release 1985, this album is viewed more as an archival release than a new album since it features mostly previously recorded material. For example, the tracks "Let It Go" and "Kitty", recorded in 1990–1991, were initially b-sides to the UK edition of the Strength single "Mother's Eyes," while the song "Happy Holiday" was first intended for the 1992 film Home Alone 2. Many of the remaining tracks on Peach Fuzz were recorded during the making of the 1993 album Animals with Human Intelligence, but were likely excluded from that release due to their poppier sounding nature.

At the time of release, the album was largely ignored in the band's concert set lists, with the exception of "Vacant Love". In more recent years, the song "Kitty" has also been performed. Although no singles were released from the album, "Happy Holiday" has turned into one of the band's more popular songs due to its inclusion in Christmas themed CD's such as Monster Ballads XMas and We Wish You a Hairy Christmas.

Peach Fuzz was initially released in Japan with a slightly different track order and a bonus track. It was later re-issued in the United States in 2008 with the original Japanese track order reinstated along with different artwork. A liner note commentary for all versions was penned by Chris Nadler, an editor at Request and Creem.

== Track listing ==
All tracks are written by Donnie Vie and Chip Z'Nuff.

| No. | Title | Length |
|---|---|---|
| 1. | "You're Not Me" | 5:23 |
| 2. | "Let It Go" | 3:55 |
| 3. | "Who's Got You Now" | 3:31 |
| 4. | "Rainy Day" | 3:58 |
| 5. | "Message of Love" | 3:52 |
| 6. | "Happy Holiday" | 4:27 |
| 7. | "Make Believe" | 2:51 |
| 8. | "So Long" | 4:07 |
| 9. | "Long Enough for Me" | 3:47 |
| 10. | "Vacant Love" | 2:21 |
| 11. | "Kitty" (hidden track) | 4:24 |

Japanese edition bonus track
| No. | Title | Length |
|---|---|---|
| 12. | "Video Man" | 4:40 |

== Personnel ==
Enuff Z'Nuff

- Donnie Vie – lead vocals, guitars and keyboards, producer, mixing
- Chip Z'Nuff – bass guitar, guitars and vocals, producer, mixing
- Ricky Parent – drums

Additional personnel

- Vikki Foxx – drums on "Let It Go"
- Darren Householder – guitar on "Vacant Love"
- Mic Fabus – guitar on "Message of Love"
- Mark Bonjovi – guitar on "Happy Holiday"
- Derek Frigo – lead guitar on tracks 2, 6, 7, and 8
- Charles Fleischer – monologue on "Kitty"

Production

- Phil Kaffel, Phil Bonanno, Chris Shepard, Paul Lani, Johnny K, Chris Demonk, Dave Mauragas, Tom Lipnick, Dan Grayless, Jeff Luif – engineers
- Chris Shepard, Paul Lani, Johnny K, Donnie Vie, Phil Kaffel, Phil Bonnanno, Chris Demonk, Chip Z'Nuff, Dave Mauragas – mixing
- Konrad Strauss – mastering

== Release history ==
| Country | Release date |
|---|---|
| Japan | January 19, 1996 |
| United States | February 27, 1996 |
