= Clowns Lounge =

Studio album by Enuff Z'Nuff
- Released: December 2, 2016
- Recorded: 1988–1989, 2004, 2016
- Genre: Hard rock, power pop
- Label: King Records (Japan); Frontiers Records (U.S., Europe)

Enuff Z'Nuff chronology
| Dissonance (2010) | Clowns Lounge (2016) | Diamond Boy (2018) |

Professional ratings
Review scores
| Source | Rating |
|---|---|
| BURRN! | 93% |

Clowns Lounge is the thirteenth studio album by Enuff Z'Nuff. It is mainly an archival release that features previously unreleased demo songs of their recording sessions from 1988-1989 in Wisconsin, back when the band was creating their first self-titled release on ATCO Records. The title of the album is a reference to a strip club they frequented between sessions. The songs mostly feature singer Donnie Vie and bassist Chip Z'Nuff, along with guitarist Derek Frigo and drummer Vikki Foxx. One newly recorded song, "Dog On a Bone," has bassist Z'Nuff on lead vocals but with no involvement from Vie. Another song, "The Devil Of Shakespeare," was originally recorded around 2004, co-written by author Billy McCarthy for his debut book of the same name. That track features McCarthy on drums, the late Jani Lane of Warrant on vocals, along with James Young of Styx on lead guitar.

On October 12, the first promotional song "Rockabye Dreamland" officially appeared on Spotify and other streaming services such as YouTube. A second song, "She Makes It Harder," was also released to streaming services on October 24, as well as a third track, "Good Luv," on November 7.

The first video and single, "Dog On a Bone," was released on November 21.

== Track listing ==
All tracks are written by Donnie Vie and Chip Z'Nuff, except where noted.

| No. | Title | Length |
|---|---|---|
| 1. | "Dog On a Bone" (Chip Z'Nuff, Tony Fennell, Mancow Muller) | 4:17 |
| 2. | "Runaway" | 4:01 |
| 3. | "Back in Time" | 3:42 |
| 4. | "She Makes It Harder" | 3:45 |
| 5. | "Rockabye Dreamland" (Donnie Vie, Z'Nuff, Derek Frigo, Vikki Foxx) | 3:34 |
| 6. | "The Devil of Shakespeare" (Z'Nuff, Billy McCarthy) | 4:31 |
| 7. | "Radio" | 4:37 |
| 8. | "Good Luv" (Vie, Z'Nuff, Frigo, Foxx) | 3:52 |
| 9. | "Round and Round" | 3:33 |
| 10. | "Nothing" | 3:48 |
| 11. | "Backstreet Kidz" | 3:01 |
| 12. | "One More Hit" | 4:55 |

Japanese bonus track
| No. | Title | Length |
|---|---|---|
| 13. | "Dog On a Bone [Different Version]" (Z'Nuff, Fennell, Muller) | 3:47 |

== Personnel ==
- Donnie Vie – vocals, guitars, piano
- Chip Z'Nuff – vocals, bass guitar
- Derek Frigo – lead guitar
- Vikki Foxx – drums

Additional personnel

- Jani Lane – lead vocals on track 6
- James "JY" Young – lead guitar on track 6
- Ron Flynt – keyboards on track 6
- Johnny Monaco – vocals on track 6
- Billy McCarthy – drums on track 6

== Release history ==
| Country | Release date |
|---|---|
| Japan | November 23, 2016 |
| United States | December 2, 2016 |
| Europe | December 2, 2016 |
