= Tweaked =

Studio album by Enuff Z'nuff
- Released: November 21, 1994 (Japan)
- Recorded: 1990, 1993–1994
- Studio: Chicago Recording Company, Mindscape Studios and Donn's, Chicago, Star Trax, Orland Park, Groovemaster, Evergreen Park, Illinois
- Genre: Hard rock
- Length: 58:35
- Label: FEMS (Japan); Mayhem (US); Music for Nations (UK)
- Producer: Chip Z'Nuff, Donnie Vie

Enuff Z'nuff chronology
1985 (1994)	Tweaked (1994)	Peach Fuzz (1996)

Alternative cover

Singles from Tweaked
- 1. "Bullet from a Gun" Released: 1995; 2. "Life Is Strange" Released: 1996

Professional ratings
Review scores
Source	Rating
AllMusic	2/5 stars
Collector's Guide to Heavy Metal	8/10

Tweaked is the 5th studio album and first independently released collection of new material by American rock band Enuff Z'nuff.

All songs were recorded in 1993-1994 except "Style" which was recorded in 1990 during Strength sessions but remained unreleased. Having been earlier presented as a glam rock band in the midst of the grunge movement, Enuff Z'nuff fought to distinguish their sound for their first proper independent release. Although the singles "Bullet from a Gun" and "Life Is Strange" lean toward a modern alternative sound, other tracks such as "My Heroin," "Without Your Love," and "How Am I Supposed To Write A Love Song?" were recorded in more of a blues rock style.

The remaining songs from Tweaked don't veer far from the formula used on earlier Enuff Z'nuff albums. Songs such as "My Dear Dream," "We're All Alright," and "Has Jesus Closed His Eyes" utilize their obvious past influences of Electric Light Orchestra, Cheap Trick and The Beatles. However, Tweaked does mark a noticeable change in direction in that lead guitar prowess was no longer a highlight. This was either due to changing times or because of the removal of guitar prodigy Derek Frigo from the band. However, credits on the original CD booklet says: Derek Frigo - lead guitars on "Style" and three other songs.

Tweaked was originally conceived to be half of a Japanese released double album. However, the sessions were eventually split into two records, with the other becoming Chip & Donnie's Brothers (later re-released as Enuff Z'Nuff's Seven in 1997). Artwork of the cover varies on some copies of this record due to the controversial image of a funeral procession in Ireland that is featured on the original release.

Tweaked also marks the return of original guitarist Gino Martino to the band, though he would soon leave the group again due to a disdain for touring. Martino would continue to record occasionally with the band on studio material. The album was re-released in 2000 and 2008.

== Track listing ==
All songs written by Donnie Vie and Chip Z'Nuff, except where noted.

1. "Stoned" – 5:08
2. "Bullet from a Gun" – 4:21
3. "Mr. Jones" (Vie, Ricky Parent) – 5:35
4. "My Dear Dream" (Vie) – 3:09
5. "Life Is Strange" (Vie) – 4:01
6. "Without Your Love" – 6:20
7. "We're All Alright" – 4:52
8. "It's Too Late" – 3:30
9. "If I Can't Have You" – 3:29
10. "Has Jesus Closed His Eyes" – 4:43
11. "Style" – 3:00
12. "My Heroin" (Z'Nuff) – 4:23
13. "How Am I Supposed to Write a Love Song?" (Vie, Z'Nuff, Parent) – 5:53

== Personnel ==
Enuff Z'nuff

- Donnie Vie – lead vocals, guitars and keyboards, producer
- Chip Z'Nuff – bass guitar, guitars and vocals, producer, mixing on track 10
- Gino Martino – lead guitar
- Ricky Parent – drums

Additional musicians

- Phil Miller – guitars (tracks 3 & 6)
- Zak Mischer – guitars (tracks 2 & 12)
- Derek Frigo – lead guitar (tracks 10 & 11)
- Norton Buffalo – harmonica
- Bruce Breckenfield – Hammond B-3 organ
- Vikki Foxx (credited as Vic Cerny) – drums (track 11)

Production

- Paul Lani – co-producer and mixing on track 11
- Chris Shepard – engineer, producer and mixing on track 12
- Chris Demonk – engineer, mixing on track 10
- Jeff Luif, Phil Bonanno, Stefon Taylor, Tom Lipnick, Johnny K, Don Grayless, Bub Phillippe, Jim Hoffman, Mike Tholen – engineers
- Eric Gast – mixing
- Brian Lee – mastering

== Release history ==
Country	Release date
Japan	November 21, 1994
United States	September 25, 1995
