= Scarlette Fever =

- Origin: Welwyn Garden City, Hertfordshire, England
- Genres: Pop-rock, alternative, pop
- Years active: 2002–present
- Label: Starfisch Records
- Website: scarlettefever.co.uk

Karen Louise Barrow (born November 1981), better known by her stage name Scarlette Fever, is an English singer, songwriter, musician and multi-instrumentalist. Born and raised in Hertfordshire, she studied music before signing to Starfisch Records.

== Career ==
=== "Crash and Burn" ===
The debut single "Crash and Burn" was co-written by Fever, Alex Smith from Metrophonic and Tony Fennell, mixed by Cenzo Townshend (Snow Patrol) and produced by Julian Emery (Lissie). The track received high rotation on BBC Radio 2's B-List. The Jason Nevins remix of "Crash and Burn" reached number 2 in the Music Week Commercial Pop Club Chart as well as the top ten of the Billboard Dance Club Breakers chart and a Top 50 Dance position in the US. On 18 September 2011, Scarlette released another single, "Elated". The track was featured as the Song of the Day on the Popjustice site and was the second single from Medication Time to spend time on the playlist on BBC Radio 2. Other tracks included "You Don't Know My Name", co-written with Grant Black and featuring a sample from the John Barry Midnight Cowboy soundtrack.

=== The Great Expectations ===
Scarlette released her EP, The Great Expectations, in spring 2012. Lead track, "Hour of Sunshine", co-written with and produced by Julian Emery, features twice: the first is remixed by Cenzo Townshend and is accompanied by a second live mix produced by Steve Lironi (Bon Jovi). The EP also comes with interpretations by Ash Howes (Texas) of live versions of "Cheatin' Man" and "Good Day", both of which were co-written with Andy Wright (Imelda May).

=== Single White Female ===
Released in September 2013, the Single White Female EP featured the lead track "Sunday Best", alongside "Looking Glass" and "Single White Female" from the Steve Lironi live sessions. "Sunday Best" had BBC Radio 2 support with Richard Allinson playing the track on his Sunday morning show in July.

=== Live ===
Fever supported Mike + the Mechanics on their 2011 UK tour, playing 22 shows across the country, on their Hit The Road tour which culminated in the band and Scarlette performing at the Royal Albert Hall. Scarlette has also supported Girls Aloud, Simon Webbe and Roachford, and has performed at official Gay pride events across the UK.

=== Remixes and DJ collaborations ===
In 2014, Scarlette released a series of remixes in the form of two dance EPs: Return of the Fever and The Fever Rides Again. The EPs featured mixes of the unheard tracks "P.S I Hate You" and "6ft Woman", as well as the previously released "Where's The Fun?". Return of the Fever includes re-works by K-Warren, Rudedog, 7th Heaven Remix & Production and DCM with The Fever Rides Again featuring Georgie Porgie, Tod Miner and Seamus Haji & Sheldon. Scarlette also continued her relationship with Jason Nevins (Run-D.M.C., N.E.R.D.) with his remix of "6ft Woman". The "P.S I Hate You" mixes were successful in the US and Scarlette got her second chart position in the Billboard with the release reaching No. 2 in the Hot Dance Club Play chart.

In early 2015, Scarlette released her third dance EP of the year: Saturday Night Fever. The first track of the release will be the Stereojackers v Mark Loverush mix of Scarlette's newly written song, "Boy and Girl". This was previewed by EDM.com and garnered over 8,500 listens in the first two months.

=== SEN activities ===
Scarlette works also as a SEN music teacher. In March 2016 she undertook a tour supported by the National Autistic Society, visiting in a series of SEN schools to run a 'school of rock' taster session for the pupils to interact with, and then played a show in the corresponding towns that evening. During the daytime SEN sessions she recorded the attending students, and combined all of the recordings from across the tour to create a 'Scarlette Choir' which she planned to feature on a track of her upcoming new album.
