= It's Up to You (The Tuesdays song) =

Single by The Tuesdays

from the album The Tuesdays
- Released: 1998
- Genre: Pop; rock
- Length: 3:59
- Label: Polydor; Arista
- Songwriters: Cheri Brandon; Guy Marshall
- Producer: Ole Evenrud

The Tuesdays singles chronology
"Too Late to Be Good" (1995)	"It's Up to You" (1998)	"I'll Be Here" (1998)

Music video
- "It's Up to You" on YouTube

"It's Up to You" is a song by Norwegian rock girl band the Tuesdays, released in 1998 as the first single from their second album, The Tuesdays (1998). The song is written by Cheri Brandon and Guy Marshall, and produced by Ole Evenrud. It was well received by music critics and became a hit in Norway, peaking at number 11 on VG-lista and number three on the radio chart Ti i skuddet. Outside Europe, the single hit success in Canada and the US, peaking at number 15 on the RPM Top Singles chart and number 55 on the Billboard Hot 100. It also reached number 23 on the Billboard Mainstream Top 40, and was played on heavy rotation on two of the most important top-40 radio-stations in the US; WPLJ New York and KIIS-FM Los Angeles. The music video was filmed in Los Angeles, directed by David Hogan.

== Composition ==
"It's Up to You" is a moody song with a tempo of 124 BPM. It can also be used half-time at 62 BPM or double-time at 248 BPM. The album track runs 4 minutes and 27 seconds long with a G key and a major mode. It has high energy and is somewhat danceable with a time signature of 4 beats per bar.

== Critical reception ==
J.D. Considine from The Baltimore Sun noted "a few Beatlesque flourishes" on the ending of the song. Ann Kristin Frøystad from Norwegian newspaper Bergensavisen felt it has "some charm that the Americans might fall for". Larry Flick from Billboard magazine wrote, "Remember the good of days when the Bangles and Go-Go's ruled? Well, the Tuesdays apparently do, and they're aiming to fill the girl rock band void. 'It's Up to You' is a sunny, pop-soaked strummer on which lead singer Laila Samuels even sounds a bit like ex-Bangle Susanna Hoffs." He added, "With breezy harmonies and fluffy keyboards as a foundation, the chorus is downright irresistible, permanently sticking to the brain upon impact. Rock radio may find the band's execution a tad too lightweight for airplay, though the track is right in the pocket of guitar-conscious top 40 formats. A promising peek into the act's eponymous debut album."

Another Billboard editor, Chuck Taylor, described the track as a "jangly, skippy Bangles-esque ode to optimism over an unfulfilled love affair, sporting the sunny chorus, So if you ever change your mind/I'll be waiting first in line/You can hang your toothbrush next to mine/It's up to you." Beth Johnson from Entertainment Weekly said, "Those long nights in Norway must have given this new babe band lots of time to listen to radio — they've borrowed from practically every pop group of the last 30 years, including early Beatles on the quintet's single 'It's Up to You'." Pål Andreassen from Moss Avis called it "hyper-catchy". Scripps Howard News Service said the single "promises to launch the gals out of Scandinavia with an iridescent sound, hooping harmonies (including a layer of "la-la-la's") and the clincher line You can hang your tootbrush next to mine."

== Track listing ==
- CD single, Europe (1998)
1. "It's Up to You" (Single-Version) — 3:59
2. "It's Up to You" (Album-Version) — 4:27
- CD single, US (1998)
1. "It's Up to You" — 3:59
2. Snippets (from their self-titled album):

- "I'll Be Here"
- "Changin' the Moods"
- "When You're a Tuesday Girl"

- CD maxi, Europe (1998)
1. "It's Up to You" (Single-Version) — 3:59
2. "It's Up to You" (Album-Version) — 4:27
3. "It's Up to You" (The Hitsville Mix) — 4:27
4. "Broken Heart" — 3:51

== Charts ==
Chart (1998)	Peak positions
Canada Top Singles (RPM)	15
Netherlands (Dutch Top 40 Tipparade)	20
Netherlands (Single Top 100)	81
Norway (VG-lista)	11
Norway (Ti i skuddet)	3
US Billboard Hot 100	55
US Mainstream Top 40 (Billboard)	23
