= Animals with Human Intelligence =

Studio album by Enuff Z'Nuff
- Released: March 9, 1993
- Recorded: 1992
- Studios: Z'nuff Towers, Blue Island, Chicago Recording Company, Chicago, Illinois, A&M Studios, One On One Studios and Music Grinder, Hollywood, California
- Genres: Hard rock; glam metal; power pop
- Length: 48:18
- Label: Arista
- Producers: Richie Zito, Phil Bonanno, Donnie Vie and Chip Z'Nuff

Enuff Z'Nuff chronology
Strength (1991)	Animals with Human Intelligence (1993)	1985 (1994)

Alternative cover

Singles from A.W.H.I.
- 1. "Right by Your Side" Released: 1993; 2. "Innocence" Released: 1993; 3. "Superstitious" Released: 1993

Professional ratings
Review scores
Source	Rating
AllMusic	3/5 stars
Collector's Guide to Heavy Metal	9/10
Entertainment Weekly	B+
People	(favorable)

Animals with Human Intelligence is the third studio album by the American rock band Enuff Z'nuff and is also their only album on Arista Records. Original drummer Vikki Foxx left the group right after the recording sessions ended, to join rocker Vince Neil's band. In addition to the promotional video for the song "Right by Your Side," the band made a live appearance on the Late Night with David Letterman TV show, performing the song "Superstitious". The song "Innocence" was released as a follow-up single, however, none of the album's singles charted on the US Hot 100.

This record was not as successful as their prior releases in the US, but the band did find some success overseas. Singer Donnie Vie and bassist Chip Z'Nuff did a promotional tour of Japan, where the album peaked at No. 49 on the Oricon Charts. The Japanese issue of the album also included the exclusive track "Fingertips". The album was later re-issued in 2000 on Spitfire Records with new artwork and "Fingertips" now included.

In 1996, the song "Bring It On Home" was to be featured in the movie Jerry Maguire, starring Tom Cruise. However, the song only appears listed in the credits and was not in the actual film, since it was in a deleted scene. The song "Rock N World" was featured in the 2011 direct-to-video film Dahmer vs. Gacy.

The song "Right by Your Side" was covered by the Norwegian rock group The Tuesdays in 1994. The same song was also covered in 2009 on G.O.O.D. Morning, G.O.O.D. Night by Malik Yusef, a Kanye West collaboration album. Yusef's version of the song also features Destiny's Child singer Michelle Williams on backing vocals.

== Track listing ==
All songs written by Donnie Vie and Chip Z'Nuff, except where noted.

1. "Superstitious" (Vie, Z'Nuff, Gino Martino) – 4:07
2. "Black Rain" – 3:48
3. "Right by Your Side" (Vie) – 4:22
4. "These Daze" – 3:51
5. "Master of Pain" – 4:25
6. "Innocence" (Vie) – 4:50
7. "One Step Closer to You" – 3:37
8. "Bring It On Home" – 3:55
9. "Takin' a Ride" – 4:11
10. "The Love Train" – 3:47
11. "Mary Anne Lost Her Baby" – 4:04
12. "Rock N World" – 3:21

Japanese and reissue editions bonus track

13. "Fingertips" – 3:50

== Personnel ==
Enuff Z'nuff

- Donnie Vie – lead vocals, guitar, piano, producer
- Derek Frigo – lead guitar
- Chip Z'Nuff – bass guitar, backing vocals, producer
- Vikki Foxx – drums

Additional musicians

- Brian Ripp, Jon Negus, Leo Kawczinski, Mark Colby, Steve Eisen, Steve Zoloto – saxophones on tracks 1 and 5
- Gary Fry – brass arrangements
- John Armstrong, Phil Kaffel – keyboard programming on track 2
- Kim Bullard – keyboard arrangements

Production

- Richie Zito – producer
- Phil Bonanno – producer on tracks 1, 2, 5, 8–12, engineer
- Dave Mauragas – engineer, assistant producer and additional engineering on track 6
- Lawrence Ethan, Bruce Breckenfeld – engineers
- Brian Scheuble, Chad Munsey, Doug McBride, Ulrich Wild – assistant engineers
- Nigel Green – mixing at Battery Studios, New York
- Eric Gast – mixing assistant
- George Marino – mastering at Sterling Sound, New York

== Release history ==
Country	Release date
United States	March 9, 1993
Japan	April 21, 1993
