= ? (Enuff Z'nuff album) =

Studio album by Enuff Z'nuff
- Released: August 18, 2004
- Recorded: 1992, 1995, 2004
- Genres: Hard rock, power pop
- Length: 41:58
- Label: Perris Records
- Producers: Chip Z'Nuff, Donnie Vie

Enuff Z'nuff chronology
Welcome To Blue Island (2003)	? (2004)	Dissonance (2010)

Professional ratings
Review scores
Source	Rating
AllMusic	3.5/5 stars

Enuff Z'nuff's 11th studio album, simply titled ?, is an odds and ends collection of previously unreleased studio material recorded throughout the band's career. Although a few new tracks were recorded specifically for the album, the remainder of the songs were originally recorded during the sessions of their albums Animals With Human Intelligence and Paraphernalia. The ? album was released first in Japan, where it peaked at No. 177. A U.S. release followed soon after in October on Perris Records, as well as a European release on Frontiers Records in early 2005.

The band did tour during the time of release (without lead singer Donnie Vie), but songs from this album were not included in their live shows. Bassist Chip Z'Nuff did make a promotional appearance on the Howard Stern radio show, where the lead track "Gorgeous" was played on-air.

== Track listing ==
All tracks are written by Donnie Vie and Chip Z'Nuff, except where noted.

No.	Title	Length
1.	"Gorgeous" (Z'Nuff)	3:40
2.	"Home Tonight"	3:16
3.	"Help..."	3:23
4.	"No Place Like Home"	4:47
5.	"Harleya"	5:21
6.	"Hang On For Life"	4:02
7.	"Man with a Woman"	4:41
8.	"How Are You?" (Vie)	3:29
9.	"Joni Woni (Likes To Ride The Pony)" (Vie)	3:39
10.	"This Guy"	3:11
11.	"Stone Cold Crazy" (Queen)	2:34

U.K. Bonus track
No.	Title	Length
12.	"Fly High Michelle (Acoustic)"	4:11

== Personnel ==
- Donnie Vie – lead vocals, guitars and keyboards
- Chip Z'Nuff – bass guitar, guitars and vocals
- Derek Frigo – lead guitar
- Vikki Foxx – drums

== Additional personnel ==
- Ricky Parent – Drums
- Jamie – Piano, Guitar
- San Francisco Fawkes – Drums
- Ashley Scott – Lead Guitar (Track 11)
- Kenny Harke – Drums (Track 11)
- Bruce Breckenfeld – Keyboards
- Gino Martino – Guitar
- Kim Bullard – Keyboards

== Production ==
- Produced by Chip Z'Nuff and Donnie Vie
- Mixing – Chris Steinmetz
