= List of Arista Records artists =

This is a list of artists who record or have recorded for Arista Records. Listed in parentheses are names of affiliated labels. Artists known by their full name are listed categorically by last name.

== 0-9 ==
- 112
- 50 Cent
- 5th Dimension

== A ==
- A Flock of Seagulls (Jive/Arista US)
- Ace of Base (Americas/Japan)
- Agung Gede
- Audrey Nuna
- Avril Lavigne
- Aretha Franklin
- Adema
- Air Supply (outside Oceania and Canada)
- The Alan Parsons Project
- Sasha Allen (Divine Mill/Arista)
- Keith Anderson (Arista Nashville)
- Anderson Bruford Wakeman Howe
- Asleep at the Wheel (Arista Nashville)
- Sherrié Austin (Arista Nashville)
- Automatic Black
- Armaan Malik

== B ==
- Babyface
- Babylon A.D.
- Bandit
- Bay City Rollers
- Beach Weather (8123/last nite/Arista)
- Bishop Briggs
- Jeff Black (Arista Austin)
- Black Box (Deconstruction/Arista)
- Black Rob (Arista/Bad Boy)
- Blackhawk (Arista Nashville)
- The Blues Band
- Bobcat
- Angela Bofill
- The Bogmen
- BoneCrusher (So So Def/Arista)
- David Bowie (Savage/Arista)
- BR549 (Arista Nashville)
- Brand Nubian
- The Braxtons
- Anthony Braxton
- Toni Braxton (LaFace/Arista)
- Breakwater
- The Brecker Brothers
- Brooks & Dunn (Arista Nashville)
- Shannon Brown (Arista Nashville)
- Jake Bugg (US)

== C ==
- Camel (band)
- Camp Lo (Profile/Arista)
- Blu Cantrell
- Caravan
- Eric Carmen
- Jason Michael Carroll (Arista Nashville)
- Deana Carter (Arista Nashville)
- David Cassidy
- Cee-Lo
- Chip
- Chris Brown
- The Church (outside Oceania)
- Ciara (Futuristic/Arista)
- Clipse (Star Trak/Arista)
- Devon Cole
- Jim Collins (Arista Nashville)
- Sean "Diddy" Combs (Bad Boy/Arista)
- Kristy Lee Cook (Arista Nashville)
- Coolio
- Deborah Cox
- Crash Test Dummies
- Creepy Nuts (Onenation/Sony Music Associated)
- Rob Crosby (Arista Nashville)
- Cruzados
- Courtney Hadwin (US)
- Carlita Trott (Bermuda)
- Custard

== D ==
- Paula DeAnda
- Da Brat (So So Def/Arista)
- Da King & I (Rowdy/Arista)
- David Glen Eisley
- Clint Daniels (Arista Nashville)
- Linda Davis (Arista Nashville)
- Paul Davis
- Taylor Dayne
- Deddy Corbuzier
- Deep Dish (deConstruction/Arista)
- Diamond Rio (Arista Nashville)
- Dido
- Dion
- DJ Quik (Profile/Arista)
- Dream (Bad Boy/Arista)
- Dreams So Real
- Duck Sauce (Ultra/Arista)
- Ian Dury
- Dyme

== E ==
- Dave Edmunds
- Electrasy
- Enuff Z'Nuff
- Eurythmics (US)
- Faith Evans (Bad Boy/Arista)
- Every Mother's Nightmare
- Exile (Arista Nashville)
- Exposé

== F ==
- Faithless
- Fashion
- Fela Anikulapo Kuti
- Fifty Fifty (Attrakt/Arista)
- Five
- Foreigner
- Radney Foster (Arista Austin)
- Foster-Pilkington (Arista/ Rockin'House)
- Fourplay
- Aretha Franklin
- From Zero
- Fuzzbubble

== G ==
- Gary Glitter
- Glenn Fredly
- Global Communication (Dedicated/Arista)
- Gob
- Goodie Mob (LaFace/Arista)
- GQ
- Tammy Graham (Career/Arista Nashville)
- Grateful Dead
- Greyson Chance
- GTR (outside Japan)

== H ==
- Happy the Man
- Haddaway
- Courtney Hadwin
- Haircut One Hundred
- Hall & Oates
- Anthony Hamilton (LaFace/Arista)
- Havana Mena (Heat Music)
- Jeff Healey
- Heaven 17 (US)
- Nick Heyward
- Taylor Hicks
- The Hollow Men
- Whitney Houston
- Rebecca Lynn Howard (Arista Nashville)
- Jennifer Hudson
- Phyllis Hyman
- Luke Hemmings

== I ==
- Icicle Works
- Iggy Pop
- Illegal (Rowdy/Arista)
- Neil Innes
- Isyss

== J ==
- Alan Jackson (Arista Nashville)
- Jermaine Jackson
- J-Kwon
- Jamal (Rowdy/Arista)
- Brett James (Career/Arista Nashville)
- Jermaine Dupri
- Flaco Jiménez (Arista Texas)
- John Legend
- Carolyn Dawn Johnson (Arista Nashville)
- Jon and Vangelis
- Stanley Jordan
- Joy Again
- JP Saxe

== K ==
- Kashif
- Keedy
- Robert Earl Keen (Arista Texas)
- Kelis (Star Trak/Arista)
- Kendell Freeman
- Kenny G
- Kenny Lattimore
- KennyHoopla (Mogul Vision/Arista)
- Alicia Keys
- DJ Khaled
- Khalid
- Kings of Leon
- The Kinks
- The KLF (US/Canada)
- Koffee Brown (Divine Mill/Arista)
- Krokus
- Kenzie Ziegler

== L ==
- Latin Quarter
- Kenny Lattimore
- Avril Lavigne
- Annie Lennox (US)
- Blake Lewis
- Linda Lewis
- Alison Limerick
- The Limit
- Lisa Lopes
- Lola Brooke (Team Eighty/Arista)
- Jeff Lorber
- Lupe Fiasco
- Lyte Funky Ones

== M ==
- M People (non-US)
- Craig Mack (Bad Boy/Arista)
- Malice
- Mama's Boys (Jive/Arista)
- Måneskin
- Melissa Manchester
- Manfred Mann's Earth Band
- Barry Manilow (Arista/RCA)
- Ma$e (Bad Boy/Arista)
- Hugh Masekela (Jive Afrika/Arista)
- Harvey Mason
- Sarah McLachlan (Nettwerk/Arista)
- Meat Loaf (outside US/Canada)
- Michael Stanley Band
- Mike & the Mechanics
- Robert Miles (deConstruction/Arista)
- Milli Vanilli (US/Canada)
- Ministry
- Kylie Minogue (Deconstruction/Arista)
- Monica (Rowdy/Arista)
- The Monkees
- Moodswings
- Abra Moore (Arista Austin)
- Chanté Moore
- Dude Mowrey (Arista Nashville)
- Lennon Murphy

== N ==
- Nas
- Naughty by Nature
- N II U
- Nerf Herder
- Peter Nero
- Next (Divine Mill/Arista)
- Nine
- Willie Nile
- No Mercy
- Nodesha
- The Notorious B.I.G. (Bad Boy/Arista)
- Nova

== O ==
- Billy Ocean (Jive/Arista)
- Tony Orlando & Dawn
- OutKast (LaFace/Arista)
- Outlaws

== P ==
- Brad Paisley (Arista Nashville)
- Pharrell Williams
- Pitbull
- Eric Prydz

== Q ==
- Q-Tip
- Qkumba Zoo

== R ==
- R. Kelly
- Real McCoy
- Lou Reed
- Rick Danko
- The Rods
- Nydia Rojas (Arista Latin)
- Run-D.M.C. (Profile/Arista)

== S ==
- The Samples
- Santana
- Gil Scott-Heron
- Secret Affair
- Serious Lee Fine
- Shihad (as Pacifier)
- Showaddywaddy
- Shyne (Bad Boy/Arista)
- Sigala
- Silver
- Carly Simon
- Simple Minds (Europe/Australia)
- Sister 7 (Arista Austin)
- Sky
- Slik
- Heather Small
- Patti Smith
- Smith & Thell
- Snap!
- Spiritualized (Dedicated/Arista)
- Lisa Stansfield (US)
- Al Stewart (US/Canada)
- Jermaine Stewart
- Angie Stone
- Steely Dan
- Straitjacket Fits
- Stray Cats (outside North America)
- Spider Webb
- Sunday 1994

== T ==
- T.I.
- Mikha Tambayong (Sony/Arista/RCA Malaysia)
- Tiny Meat Gang
- Take That (US/Canada)
- Tha' Rayne (Divine Mill/Arista)
- Carl Thomas (Bad Boy/LaFace/Arista)
- Marlo Thomas
- Thompson Twins
- Three Times Dope
- Pam Tillis (Arista Nashville)
- TLC (LaFace/Arista)
- Louis Tomlinson
- Too Nice
- Judy Torres (Profile/Arista)
- Total (Bad Boy/Arista)
- Toya
- The Tractors (Arista Nashville)
- Tanya Tucker (Arista Nashville)
- Dwight Twilley Band
- Tycoon
- Tyga
- Ryan Tyler (Arista Nashville)
- Travis Porter
- The Sobas

== U ==
- Carrie Underwood (Arista Nashville)
- UPSAHL
- Usher (LaFace/Arista)
- Uropa Lula

== V ==
- Vanilla Ice
- Phil Vassar (Arista Nashville)
- Mario Vazquez
- Tai Verdes (Fourth Wall/Last Nite/Arista)-No longer listed on the Arista Records website as of July 9th 2026

== W ==
- Loudon Wainwright III
- Butch Walker
- Steve Wariner (Arista Nashville)
- Jennifer Warnes
- Dionne Warwick
- Westlife (outside United States with the release of their 2000 debut album featuring the #1 UK hit single “Swear It Again”, as the group’s first and only single to be charted in the US)
- Whodini (Jive/Arista)
- Calvin Wiggett (Arista Nashville)
- Michelle Wright (Arista Nashville)
- Pharrell Williams

== Y ==
- Yes
- YoungBloodZ (Ghet-O-Vision/LaFace/Arista)
- Yung Bae

== Z ==
- Mackenzie Ziegler
- Zones
