= Chris Shepard =

American recording engineer

Chris Shepard is an American recording engineer and general manager at Chicago Recording Company.

He is best known for his work with KMFDM, having engineered some of their most popular albums. He also worked on some of Sascha Konietzko's side projects. In addition, he has worked with many other bands, including PIG, Treponem Pal, Prong, Kidneythieves, Wilco, Smashing Pumpkins, Peter Murphy, and Incubus.

== Partial discography ==
=== With KMFDM ===
- Angst (1993)
- Naïve/Hell To Go (1994)
- Nihil (1995)
- Xtort (1996)
- Rules (1996)
- Symbols (1997)
- Agogo (1998)
- Adios (1999)
- Attak (2002)
- WWIII (2003)
- Blitz (2009)

=== Other work ===
- Excessive Force – Gentle Death (1993)
- Smashing Pumpkins – Mellon Collie and the Infinite Sadness (1995)
- Enuff Z'Nuff – Tweaked (1995)
- Enuff Z'Nuff – Peach Fuzz (1996)
- Wilco – Being There (1996)
- Enuff Z'Nuff – Seven (1997)
- Enuff Z'Nuff – Paraphernalia (1999)
- MDFMK – MDFMK (2000)
- Enuff Z'Nuff – 10 (2000)
- Ted Wulfers & Beggar's Bridge – Agave Blue (2002)
- Enuff Z'Nuff – Welcome To Blue Island (2003)
- The Projection People – The Projection People (2010)
