= G.O.O.D. Morning, G.O.O.D. Night =

Studio album by Malik Yusef
- Released: June 2, 2009
- Recorded: 2007–2009
- Genre: Hip hop; spoken word
- Length: CD1: 78:00; CD2: 71:00
- Label: GOOD
- Producer: Kanye West; Malik Yusef; Tapez; Grant Parks; Devo Springsteen; Chip Z'Nuff; Alon Eig; AVO; SP; Jesse Black; Kevin Dobbins; JesTone; Fast Eddie; Zzaje; David Hassan Khaffaf; Frayne T. Lewis; Lemoyne Alexander; Hearon Trackz; Mil Tickit; Jamil "Face" Johnson; Spider Raw

Malik Yusef chronology
| The Great Chicago Fire; A Cold Day in Hell (2003) | G.O.O.D. Morning, G.O.O.D. Night (2009) |

Singles from G.O.O.D. Morning, G.O.O.D. Night
- 1. "Magic Man"

Professional ratings
Review scores
| Source | Rating |
|---|---|
| BBC Music | (favorable) |
| The Guardian | 2/5 stars |
| NME | (3/10) |

G.O.O.D. Morning, G.O.O.D. Night, is the second studio album by Chicago-based artist Malik Yusef. It features collaborations with Kanye West and several performers signed to his label GOOD Music. The project contains two CDs, "Dusk" and "Dawn", each of which has a special meaning:

"Dusk and Dawn represent the two sides to everything. That's how we keep from making the mistake of going too far into the other. Night and Day, Ying and Yang. Everything flows into the universe and we are all a part of it."

However these were released separately. Originally, each album had 12 songs, representing the 24 hours of the day, however Malik announced later that each album would feature 15 tracks. The project was intended to bring together the strongest Chicago-based artists. The project features many other GOOD Music artists, including Big Sean, Really Doe, Common, Mr Hudson, GLC and John Legend, alongside well-known hip hop artists including KRS-One, Twista, and Paul Wall, and operatic contralto AnnaMaria Cardinalli. The release of the album figures in the 2013 book by Cardinalli Crossing the Wire: One Woman's Journey into the Hidden Dangers of the Afghan War. ISBN 9781612001913

The album was released on June 2, 2009.

== Track listing ==
CD 1: Dawn
| No. | Title | Producer | Length |
|---|---|---|---|
| 1. | "G.O.O.D. Morning Luv" (featuring Opal Staples and Amanda Porshe) | Tapez; Malik Yusef (co.) | 4:14 |
| 2. | "My People" (featuring KRS-One and Mreld) | Grant Parks | 4:41 |
| 3. | "Leader (The Jesus Peace)" (featuring Maxamillion, J.V. and Cheyl Lynn Toblin) | Devo Springsteen; Yusef (co.); Burundi "Bun" Parlow (co.) | 4:21 |
| 4. | "V.E.R.S.E. (Very Entertaining Recitals Spit Effortlessly)" (featuring Big Sean and AnnaMaria Cardinalli) | Springsteen; Yusef (co.) | 4:04 |
| 5. | "By Your Side" (featuring Michelle Williams and Brando) | Chip Z'Nuff; Ole Evenrude (co.); Jeff Luis (co.) | 4:45 |
| 6. | "U-N-I Verses Mine" (featuring Twista and Chip Z'nuff) | Chip Z'nuff; CUZO (co.) | 4:41 |
| 7. | "Promised Land" (featuring Kanye West and Adam Levine) | West; Alon Eig | 3:59 |
| 8. | "Not Love" (featuring J.V. and Mica) | AVO; Yusef (co.) | 3:44 |
| 9. | "Thug Angel" (featuring Christopher Denson and Uneq'ka) | SP; Yusef (co.) | 3:55 |
| 10. | "G.E.M. (G.O.O.D. Enuff Me)" (featuring Tony Williams and Phenom) | Kevin Dobbins; Yusef (co.) | 5:44 |
| 11. | "FreshCoolDopeFly" (featuring Shorty-K and Tassho Pearce) | JesTone; Yusef (co.) | 4:10 |
| 12. | "Just Like Forever" (featuring Erika Shevon) | SP; Jesse Black; CUZO (co.) | 4:50 |
| 13. | "Elevated (So High)" (featuring J.V. and BeNda WORLD) | AVO; Yusef (co.) | 4:36 |
| 14. | "Breathtaking" (featuring Uneq'ka) | Tapez; Yusef (co.) | 4:59 |
| 15. | "Sexuality" (featuring Fast Eddie and Lidell Townsend) | Fast Eddie | 4:20 |

CD 2: Dusk
| No. | Title | Producer | Length |
|---|---|---|---|
| 1. | "Too Knight (The Underworld)" (featuring Jennifer Hudson and Zzaje) | Zzaje | 4:10 |
| 2. | "Chicago" (featuring Maxamillion, J.V., Really Doe and GLC) | David Hassan Khaffaf; Malik Yusef (co.) | 4:50 |
| 3. | "Hit It Again" (featuring Siren) | Frayne T. Lewis | 4:36 |
| 4. | "Know God?" (featuring J. Ivy, Red Storm and Fatin Dantzler) | Zzaje; Yusef (co.) | 4:08 |
| 5. | "Magic Man" (featuring Kanye West, Common and John Legend) | West | 4:31 |
| 6. | "YUGO" (featuring Brando, Big Nastee and K-Love) | JesTone; Yusef (co.) | 4:33 |
| 7. | "My My" (featuring Paul Wall, J.V. and Maurice Mahon) | Lemoyne Alexander | 4:34 |
| 8. | "Waited" (featuring Chairman Fred Hampton, J.V. and Nia) | Hearon Trackz | 4:34 |
| 9. | "The Return (Here She Comes Again)" (featuring Yaw and Mr Hudson) | Tapez; Mil Tickit; Yusef (co.); Parlow (co.) | 5:27 |
| 10. | "Da Slumz" (featuring Raheem DeVaughn, Kumasi and Bun B) | Jamil "Face" Johnson | 4:52 |
| 11. | "Mean to Say" (featuring Vaughn Anthony) | Devo Springsteen; Yusef (co.); Parlow (co.) | 7:00 |
| 12. | "Addicted" (featuring J.V.) | Spider Raw | 5:06 |
| 13. | "Warpath" (featuring Trixie Fender and Queen YoNasDa) | Tapez; Mil Tickit; Yusef (co.); Parlow (co.) | 4:41 |
| 14. | "So Pop U Layer" (featuring Violet Nine) | Yusef; Parlow (co.) | 3:58 |
| 15. | "Stop" (featuring Spike Rebel, J.V., Slique, Brando and Mack P) | JesTone | 4:20 |
