= The Tuesdays =

Norwegian rock group

- Origin: Norway
- Genres: Rock
- Years active: 1990-1998
- Labels: Arista; BMG; Mercury; Polydor; Polygram
- Members: Laila Samuelsen; Kristin Werner; May Hole; Hege Solli; Linda Gustafsson

The Tuesdays were a Norwegian rock group formed in 1990 in Larvik, Norway. Originally called No Limits, they were somewhat similar in sound to The Bangles. They released their debut album in 1994 in Norway and Japan, entitled When You're a Tuesday Girl, under the name The Tuesday Girls and with Jeanette Heidenstrøm as vocalist. After reconfiguring to include singer Laila Samuelsen and drummer Linda Gustafsson, they changed their name to The Tuesdays and signed with Arista in 1997. Their self-titled album had some commercial success, especially the single "It's Up to You". Their follow-up album was rejected by Arista, and the group split up. Former lead singer Laila Samuelsen released a solo album in 2002 and is still involved in writing music.

== Discography ==
- When You're a Tuesday Girl (1994)(Mercury)
- The Tuesdays (1998)(Arista)

== Singles ==
- "Right By Your Side" (1994)
- "The Air That I Breathe" (1994)
- "It's Up to You" (1995)
- "Too Late To Be Good" (1995)
- "It's Up to You" (new version) (1998) #23 Top 40 Mainstream, #55 US Hot 100
- "I'll Be Here" (1998)
- "I Was Thinking Of You" (1998)
- "Changin' The Moods" (1998)

== See also ==
- The Bangles
