= 10 (Enuff Z'nuff album) =

Studio album by Enuff Z'Nuff
- Released: October 3, 2000
- Recorded: 1995–2000
- Genre: Hard rock, glam metal
- Length: 46:10
- Label: Spitfire / Stoney Records
- Producer: Chip Z'Nuff, Donnie Vie

Enuff Z'Nuff chronology
Paraphernalia (1999)	10 (2000)	Welcome to Blue Island (2003)

Singles from 10
- 1. "There Goes My Heart" Released: 2000

Professional ratings
Review scores
Source	Rating
AllMusic	3/5 stars
MelodicRock.com	85%

'10' is the 9th studio album, and 10th overall release by the Rock band Enuff Z'Nuff. By fans, it is sometimes seen as the poppier counterpart to their harder sounding Paraphernalia record, as both albums were recorded and released during a similar time frame. The album cover art for '10' is a direct reference to the band's debut album, released a decade earlier. While the original U.S. edition of the album included a video for the single "There Goes My Heart" in QuickTime format, '10' was released first in Japan through the Pony Canyon label. The band also toured Japan in 2000 in support of the CD, which peaked at #60 on the Japanese music charts. The song "There Goes My Heart" was later featured in a trailer for the 2008 film The Promotion.

== Track listing ==
All tracks are written by Vie and Znuff, except where noted.

No.	Title	Length
1.	"There Goes My Heart"	3:38
2.	"Fly Away" (Vie)	5:08
3.	"The Beast" (Vie)	3:32
4.	"Your Heart's No Good...But I Love Your Face"	3:57
5.	"Wake Up"	4:44
6.	"What Can I Do?"	4:20
7.	"Suicide"	2:35
8.	"All Right"	3:04
9.	"Holiday"	3:18
10.	"Bang On"	3:51
11.	"The Jean Genie" (David Bowie)	4:10
12.	"Everything Works if You Let It" (Rick Nielsen)	3:17

=== Japanese Track List ===
All tracks are written by Vie and Znuff, except where noted.

No.	Title	Length
1.	"Wake Up"	4:44
2.	"The Beast" (Vie)	3:32
3.	"There Goes My Heart"	3:38
4.	"What Can I Do?"	4:20
5.	"Suicide"	2:35
6.	"Your Heart's No Good... ...But I Love Your Face"	3:57
7.	"All Right"	3:04
8.	"Holiday"	3:18
9.	"Bang On"	3:51
10.	"Fly Away" (Vie)	5:08
11.	"No Place To Go" (^)	4:00
12.	"The Jean Genie" (David Bowie)	4:10

^ - Originally Released on US "Paraphernalia" (1999) but now featuring different lyrics and Chip Z'Nuff on vocals.

== Personnel ==
- Donnie Vie – lead vocals, guitars and keyboards
- Chip Z'Nuff – bass guitar, guitars and vocals
- Johnny Monaco – lead guitar
- Ricky Parent – drums

== Liner Notes ==
Produced By : Chip and Donnie
Mixed By : Chris Shepard
Additional Mixing By : Doug McBride, Johnny K, Bill Douglas
Recorded At : Star Trax, Groove Master, Velvet Shirts Studios, Gravity Studios
Additional Guitars : Billy Corgan, French, and Derek Frigo
