= Fly High Michelle =

1990 single by Enuff Z'nuff

Single by Enuff Z'Nuff

from the album Enuff Z'nuff
- Released: 1990
- Recorded: 1989
- Genre: Glam metal; psychedelic
- Length: 4:17
- Songwriter: Donnie Vie

Enuff Z'Nuff singles chronology
"New Thing" (1989)	"Fly High Michelle" (1990)	"Mother's Eyes" (1991)

"Fly High Michelle" is a power ballad by American rock band Enuff Z'Nuff that was released as a single in 1990. It was the biggest hit of their career, reaching No. 47 and 49 on the US Billboard Hot 100 and Cash Box Top 100, and No. 27 on the Billboard Mainstream Rock chart.

== Background ==
The song was written by lead vocalist Donnie Vie about a friend who had died.

== Personnel ==
- Donnie Vie – lead vocals, guitars and keyboards
- Chip Z'Nuff – bass guitar, guitars and vocals
- Derek Frigo – lead guitar
- Vikki Fox – drums

== Charts ==
Chart (1990)	Peak position
US Billboard Hot 100	47
US Mainstream Rock (Billboard)	27
US Cash Box Top 100	49
