= Sugar Boxx =

- Directed by: Cody Jarrett
- Written by: Cody Jarrett
- Produced by: Jennifer Saxon; Cody Jarrett
- Starring: Geneviere Anderson; Tura Satana; Thela Brown; Michael Gerald; Linda Dona; Nick Eldredge; Kitten Natividad; Darin Cooper; Glen Mac; Rainbow Borden; Joey Stafura; Jayme Rhae Edwards
- Cinematography: David E. Diano
- Edited by: Cody Jarrett
- Release date: September 5, 2009
- Country: United States
- Language: English

Sugar Boxx is a 2009 "women-in-prison" film directed by Cody Jarrett.

== Plot ==
A sexy news reporter goes undercover into a women’s prison to expose a sleazy, seductive warden who is a pimp in a secret prison prostitution ring.

== Cast ==
- Geneviere Anderson as Valerie March
- Thela Brown as Loretta Sims (credited as The'La Brown)
- Linda Dona as Warden Beverly Buckner
- Kitten Natividad as Matron Mays
- Nick Eldridge as Sheriff Toll
- Ariadne Shaffer as Lori Sutton
- Jayme Rhae Edwards as Cheryl Jean McGossard (credited as Jayme Edwards)
- Darin Cooper as Captain Greene
- Jack Hunter as Gilbert Sackry
- Jacqueline Scott as Irene Guilly
- Tura Satana as Judge #1
- Jack Hill as Judge #2
- Rainbow Borden as Elmer Lee Fish
- Athena Demos as Rita
