= Paraphernalia (album) =

Studio album by Enuff Z'nuff
- Released: May 4, 1999
- Recorded: 1995–1998
- Studio: Chicago Recording Company and Velvet Shirt Studios, Chicago, Star Trax, Orland Park, Groovemaster, Evergreen Park, Illinois
- Genre: Hard rock, power pop
- Length: 54:34
- Label: Stoney / Spitfire
- Producer: Chip Z'Nuff, Donnie Vie

Enuff Z'nuff chronology
Seven (1997)	Paraphernalia (1999)	10 (2000)

Singles from Paraphernalia
- 1. "Freak" Released: 1999

Professional ratings
Review scores
Source	Rating
AllMusic	4/5 stars
Collector's Guide to Heavy Metal	8/10

Paraphanelia is the eighth studio album by American rock band Enuff Z'Nuff, released on May 4, 1999, through Spitfire Records.

Paraphernalia' is arguably heavier in nature than many of their previous recordings. This album is also notable for its guest appearances from famous Chicago area musicians, including Rick Nielsen of Cheap Trick, James Young of Styx, and Billy Corgan of The Smashing Pumpkins, all featured on lead guitar for several of the album's tracks.

A promotional video was shot for the single "Freak". The director of the video, comedian Matt Kissane, is also a Chicago resident. Clips from the "Freak" video were televised nationally on VH1. The song "Ain't It Funny" also received national exposure with the band's live performance on The Jenny Jones Show.

The cover art of the US version of the album is a homage to the rock band Queen's second album, Queen II. The Japanese version of Paraphernalia, released earlier than the US edition, features different artwork and fewer songs than its domestic counterpart. While promoting this record, the full band toured in Japan for the first time, where they have found some success over the years.

== Track listing ==
All songs written by Donnie Vie and Chip Z'Nuff, except where indicated

1. "Freak" – 4:54
2. "Top of the Hill" – 2:53
3. "Ain't It Funny" – 3:44
4. "Believe in Love" – 4:36
5. "Habit" – 4:01
6. "Baby You're the Greatest" – 4:42
7. "Someday" (Vie) – 3:43
8. "Unemotional" – 3:57
9. "Invisible" – 4:19
10. "All Alone" – 4:10
11. "Everything Works if You Let It" (Rick Nielsen) – 3:17
12. "Save Me" – 3:30 (US Release Only)
13. "No Place to Go" – 4:00 (US Release Only)
14. "Loser of the World" (Vie) – 2:29

== Personnel ==
Enuff Z'Nuff

- Donnie Vie – lead vocals, guitars, keyboards, producer
- Chip Z'Nuff – bass guitar, guitars and vocals, producer
- Johnny Monaco – lead guitar
- Ricky Parent – drums

Additional musicians

- Rick Nielsen – lead guitar (tracks 1, 8 & 10)
- "J.Y." Young – lead guitar (tracks 2, 9 & 12)
- Billy Corgan – lead guitar (track 11)

Production

- Chris Shepard – engineer, mixing
- Eric Gast, Jeff Luif, Johnny K, Mike Tholen, Phil Bonanno, "Dollar" Douglas, Jeff Lane, Duane Exline, Ron Lowe – engineers
- Dan Stout – mastering

== Release history ==
Country	Release date
Japan	July 17, 1998
United States	May 4, 1999
