= 1985 (album) =

- Cover to the American edition

Studio album by Enuff Z'Nuff
- Released: May 2, 1994
- Recorded: 1985, 1994
- Studio: Star Trax, Crestwood, Illinois
- Genre: Hard rock, glam metal, power pop
- Length: 41:36
- Label: Big Deal / Caroline
- Producer: Chip Z'Nuff, Donnie Vie

Enuff Z'Nuff chronology
Animals with Human Intelligence (1993)	1985 (1994)	Tweaked (1995)

Japanese cover

Singles from 1985
- 1. "You Got A Hold Of Me" Released: 1994

Professional ratings
Review scores
Source	Rating
AllMusic	2/5 stars
Collector's Guide to Heavy Metal	8/10
Entertainment Weekly	B+

1985 is the fourth studio album by the American rock band Enuff Z'Nuff, which features material recorded in the band's earliest days. The songs were taken from a demo at the time called Hollywood Squares, originally recorded in 1985. Musically, the songs were noticeably more pop rock in direction as opposed to the hard rock recordings they had been known for.

Although the album contains nearly all original material, the opening track is a cover of Smokey Robinson's "Tears of a Clown". The only new recording at the time of release was a bonus track titled "You Got a Hold of Me" (sometimes referred to as "The Valentine's Song" due to its opening lyric). This song is noteworthy for the fact that it was used as the album's lead promotional single, despite being an unlisted hidden track.

The liner notes were written by popular American shock-jock and longtime fan Howard Stern. His words regarding the band were later reprinted for the band's greatest hits album several years later. The song "Fingers on It" first appeared in the cult film Henry: Portrait of a Serial Killer, with the band credited as Enough Z'Nuff, as that was the original spelling of the band name when the movie was made. The album artwork parodies the cover design of Road & Track. The cover mentions the Ferrari 288 GTO car brand and State Farm financial institution.

== Track listing ==
All songs written by Donnie Vie and Chip Z'Nuff, except where noted.

1. "Tears of a Clown" (Hank Cosby, Smokey Robinson, Stevie Wonder) – 3:59
2. "Catholic Girls" – 3:39
3. "Day by Day" (Vie) – 3:21
4. "No Second Time" – 5:07
5. "Hollywood Squares" – 3:46
6. "Fingers on It" – 4:11
7. "Aroused" (Vie) – 3:15
8. "Marie" – 3:29
9. "I'll B the 1 2 Luv U" – 3:40
10. "Goodbye, Goodbye" – 4:20
11. "You Got a Hold of Me" (Vie) – 2:49 (hidden track)

Japanese and re-issue editions bonus track

12. "Hide Your Love Away" (Lennon–McCartney) – 2:27 (live on The Howard Stern Show)

== Personnel ==
Enuff Z'Nuff

- Donnie Vie – lead vocals, guitars and keyboards, producer
- Chip Z'Nuff – bass guitar, guitars and vocals, producer

Additional musicians

- Gino Martino – guitars
- B.W. Boeski – drums

Production

- Jeff Luif – engineer, additional mixing
- Dave Mauragas – additional engineering
- Jamie Osborn – producer and engineer of track 12
- Chris Shepard – mixing at Chicago Recording Company, Chicago, Illinois
- Don Grossinger – mastering at Europadisk, New York
- Joshua Shapera – additional programming
