= Welcome to Blue Island =

Studio album by Enuff Z'nuff
- Released: June 24, 2003
- Recorded: 2001–2002
- Genre: Hard rock, power pop
- Length: 54:42
- Label: Perris Records
- Producer: Chip Z'Nuff, Donnie Vie

Enuff Z'nuff chronology
10 (2000)	Welcome to Blue Island (2003)	? (2004)

Professional ratings
Review scores
Source	Rating
AllMusic	3.5/5 stars

Welcome to Blue Island was the final recording of new studio material by Enuff Z'nuff before lead singer Donnie Vie left the group in 2002. As a result, Vie did not tour to support the album. However, the band continued playing shows at this time with lead guitarist Monaco taking over vocal duties. As was common for the band, Welcome To Blue Island was released first in Japan, where it charted at No. 90.

The U.S. version of the album with several bonus tracks came in June 2003 on the Perris Records label, where it became the label's top seller of 2004. The song "87 Days" is a live acoustic performance for a radio show with BulletBoys lead singer Marq Torien on co-vocals and future Guns N' Roses guitarist DJ Ashba on guitar. The songs "Roll Me," "Can't Wait," and "Z Overture" would all be used in the 2011 film Dahmer Vs. Gacy.

== Track listing ==
All tracks are written by Donnie Vie and Chip Z'Nuff, except where noted.

No.	Title	Length
1.	"Saturday"	3:21
2.	"Can't Wait"	4:12
3.	"Good Times (Are Hard to Find)" (Vie)	5:30
4.	"Sanibel Island"	4:14
5.	"I've Fallen in Love Again"	5:53
6.	"Roll Me"	2:55
7.	"Roller Bladin' in the Shade"	4:44
8.	"Man Without a Heart"	3:57
9.	"Z Overture"	3:27
10.	"Zentemental Journey" (Vie)	4:19
11.	"The Sun" (Vie)	2:05

U.S. Bonus tracks
No.	Title	Length
12.	"You've Got to Hide Your Love Away (Live)" (John Lennon/Paul McCartney)	2:27
13.	"87 Days (Live)"	3:18
14.	"All Apologies (Studio Outtake)" (Kurt Cobain)	3:09
15.	"July 1970" (Vie)	1:12

== Personnel ==
- Donnie Vie – lead vocals, guitars and keyboards
- Chip Z'Nuff – bass guitar, guitars and vocals
- Johnny Monaco – lead guitar
- Ricky Parent – drums

== Additional personnel ==
- DJ Ashba (Track 13)
- Marq Torien (Track 13)

== Production ==
- Produced by Stemz & Seedz (Chip Z'Nuff and Donnie Vie)
- Mixing – Chris Steinmetz, Jeff Luif, and Chris Shepard
- Engineering – Chris Steinmetz, Jeff Luif, Dave Maragus

== Release history ==
Country	Release date
Japan	July 17, 2002
United Kingdom	September 23, 2002
United States	June 24, 2003
