= Diamond Boy =

Studio album by Enuff Z'Nuff
- Released: August 10, 2018
- Genre: Rock, hard rock, power pop, glam metal
- Label: Frontiers
- Producer: Ron Proesel (executive), Enuff Z'Nuff, Rob Pozen

Enuff Z'Nuff chronology
Clowns Lounge (2016)	Diamond Boy (2018)	Brainwashed Generation (2020)

Diamond Boy is the fourteenth studio album by the American rock band Enuff Z'Nuff. The album was released August 10, 2018 on Frontiers Records. It is the first Enuff Z'Nuff release to not feature their former lead singer Donnie Vie. Bassist Chip Z'Nuff performs the lead vocal duties on each track of the album.

== Reception ==
Professional ratings
Review scores
Source	Rating
immusicmag.com	8/10 stars

Jason Mesa of immusicmag.com rated the album 8/10 stars, saying that "Faith Hope & Luv" was his favorite track off the album.

== Track listing ==
The following track listing was adapted from iTunes.

All tracks are written by Z'Nuff, Fennell, Stoffregen, and Hill unless noted.

No.	Title	Writer(s)	Length
1.	"Transcendence"		1:04
2.	"Diamond Boy"		3:01
3.	"Where Did You Go"		3:53
4.	"We're All the Same"	Z'Nuff, Fennell, Stoffregen, Hill, Catalina	5:03
5.	"Fire & Ice"		5:15
6.	"Down on Luck"		4:52
7.	"Metalheart"		4:49
8.	"Love is on the Line"		5:08
9.	"Faith Hope & Luv"		4:18
10.	"Dopesick"		4:34
11.	"Imaginary Man"		4:20

== Personnel ==
- Chip Z'nuff – lead vocals, bass, guitar
- Tory Stoffregen – lead guitar and slide guitar
- Tony Fennell – electric guitar and keyboards
- Daniel B. Hill – drums and percussion
