= New Thing (Enuff Z'Nuff song) =

1989 single by Enuff Z'nuff

Single by Enuff Z'Nuff

from the album Enuff Z'nuff
- Released: 1989
- Recorded: 1989
- Genre: Glam metal; power pop
- Length: 4:22
- Songwriter(s): Donnie Vie, Chip Z'Nuff

Enuff Z'Nuff singles chronology
"New Thing" (1989)	"Fly High Michelle" (1990)

"New Thing" is a song by American rock band Enuff Z'Nuff that was released as a single in 1989. This song (peaking at #67), along with "Fly High Michelle" (peaking at #47), were the group's two entries on the US Hot 100.

== Background ==
The song was written in Lake Geneva, Wisconsin, and the demo recorded in bassist Chip Z'Nuff's one-bedroom apartment that he was too broke to even afford. The band played the demo for this song and two others over the phone for their management company at 2 AM, and Chip realized they may have had something special when the management asked to hear the songs four times.

== Music video ==
The song's video was placed into heavy rotation on MTV, and was put on the New York Times list of the "15 Essential Hair-Metal Videos".

== Charts ==
Year	Chart	Position
1989	Billboard Hot 100	67
1989	Mainstream Rock	35
