= Dissonance (album) =

Studio album by Enuff Z'Nuff
- Released: April 22, 2009
- Recorded: 2006–2009
- Genres: Hard rock, power pop
- Length: 45:16
- Labels: King Records (Japan); Rock Candy / Grind That Axe (UK); Cleopatra Records (US)
- Producers: Vinnie Castaldo and Enuff Z'Nuff

Enuff Z'Nuff chronology
? (2004)	Dissonance (2009)	Clowns Lounge (2016)

Professional ratings
Review scores
Source	Rating
AllMusic	3/5 stars
Classic Rock	8/10 stars
RevelationZ	8/10 stars
Hard Rock Hideout	8/10 stars

Dissonance is the 12th studio album from the band Enuff Z'Nuff. The album reunites singers/songwriters Donnie Vie and Chip Z'Nuff after Vie's hiatus from the band of several years. Original sessions for the album started in 2006, prompted by the band's possible inclusion in a pilot episode for the VH-1 show "Bands on the Run." Songs from these initial sessions, bootlegged as Lost In Vegas by fans, would be later reworked for the official release of Dissonance. Several songs on the CD feature past Ozzy Osbourne/Badlands guitarist Jake E. Lee.

A limited edition of Dissonance was first sold in the U.S. at the Rocklahoma festival on July 10, 2008, featuring 9 tracks. Dissonance was officially released April 22, 2009 in Japan and on July 19, 2010, in the U.K. The U.K. edition features the bonus tracks "Code Red" and "Run For Your Life."

Initially planned as a DVD release, a 2-CD live album of Enuff Z'Nuff's Japanese tour of Dissonance was created. Titled Live And Peace, it was released in Japan through King Records in December 2009.

On November 27, 2020, a limited edition colored-vinyl release of Dissonance was released on Cleopatra/Deadline Records in the United States. Featuring new cover art, it is also the first time the album has technically been released on a U.S. label.

== Track listing ==
All tracks are written by Donnie Vie and Chip Z'Nuff, except where noted.

No.	Title	Length
1.	"Dissonance"	5:35
2.	"Fine Line"	3:21
3.	"Lazy Dazy"	3:19
4.	"Roll Away"	3:40
5.	"High"	4:46
6.	"Altered States"	3:12
7.	"Playground"	4:04
8.	"Sometimes"	4:13
9.	"Joni Lynn"	4:07
10.	"Chicago"	4:20

Bonus tracks
No.	Title	Length
11.	"Code Red (Previously Unreleased Studio Outtake)"	4:00
12.	"When Doves Cry" (Prince)	4:40
13.	"Run For Your Life (Previously Unreleased Studio Outtake)" (John Lennon/Paul McCartney)	2:42

== Personnel ==
- Donnie Vie – Vocals, Guitars, Piano
- Chip Z'Nuff – Vocals, Bass Guitar
- Jake E. Lee – Lead Guitar
- Vinnie Castaldo – Drums

== Release history ==
Country	Release date
Japan	April 22, 2009
United Kingdom	July 19, 2010
United States	November 27, 2020
