= Tony Fennell =

British musician, writer and producer

Tony Fennell (born 16 November 1963) is a British musician, songwriter, composer and producer. He was the lead singer, lyricist and musician for the band Ultravox from 1992 until 1994, as well as a composer and producer of music for television.

Fennell has signed publishing and recording contracts with Warner Brothers, Atlantic, EMI and BMG. His film and television credits include Disney, Nickelodeon, Viacom, HBO, PBS and Syfy as well as commercials for Dodge, Mattel and General Mills.

== Career ==
Fennell was born in Birmingham, and started playing music in the early 1980s, signing his first publishing contract with Warner/Chappell Music. His band, Mr. President, went on to sign with Atlantic Records. During this time, Fennell was also the bass player for Edwin Starr. In 1985, the band changed its name to 'Big Noise'. The band released the album Bang!, produced by Elliot Wolfe. He toured extensively throughout the United Kingdom and Europe, including with James Brown.

After moving to the US permanently in the late 1980s, Fennell co-wrote with David Frank the track "If You Believe" for soul singer Kenny Thomas' 1991 album Voices.

In 1992, Fennell became the lead singer of UK band Ultravox and signed with EMI. He recorded the EP Vienna 92 and co-wrote the album Revelation.

Teaming up with Rod Gammons and Bob Khozouri, he co-wrote two songs for Jaki Graham's album Hold On and another for her album Real Life.

In 1996/7, Fennell formed the band Luxx with fellow Englishman Ian Hatton and signed with Push/BMG. The band went on to record two albums: Luxx and Hyrdroponic and toured the US over a period of 4 years.

In 2004, he signed with Zest Music as the in-house writer/producer working in conjunction with CEO Steve Weltman (Chrysalis, Hit and Run Music). With Zest, Fenelle wrote and produced with Richard Evans and co-wrote and produced the album Night Racing for Tara Chinn. Fenelle and Chinn went on to tour Australia to promote the album Night Racing.

In 2010, Fennell co-wrote "Crash and Burn" and "Black and White" with Alex Smith and Karen Louise Barrow. "Crash and Burn" achieved high rotation on BBC Radio 2's B-List and the Jason Nevins remix reached number 2 in the Music Week Commercial Pop Club Chart. It also made the top ten of the Billboard Breakout Club Charts in the US.

In 2013/14, Fennell wrote and co-produced with Jason Silver the album Bring It Back for singer Brenda Edwards. He wrote and produced with bass player Chip Z'nuff and the band Enuff Z'nuff and has produced two songs for the band's album Diamond Boy.

In March 2019, following a three-and-a-half-year stint with the band, Fennell announced his departure from Enuff Z'nuff in a statement on the band's Facebook page.

June 2019 saw Fennell join as lead singer and guitar player for the band When in Rome II. During January–March 2020, he embarked on a nationwide US tour with the Motels and recorded new material for the band.

In 2024, Fennell, When in Rome's Michael Floreale, and former the Cult drummer Les Warner, started a new group, the Nü Wave. The Nü Wave covers songs of their former bands as well as of other British new wave groups, while incorporating stories from the road.

== As composer for film and television ==
In 1995, Fennell signed a publishing deal with Japanese company Avex. While with Avex, Fennell co-wrote the underscore for the film Within the Rock (Gary Tunnicliffe) for the Syfy Channel.

In the early 2000s, he composed and recorded songs for Bear in the Big Blue House (Disney), Little Bill (CBS), Out of the Box (Nickelodeon), Gullah Gullah Island (Nickelodeon), Cyberchase (PBS), Scrubs (ABC) and Nash Bridges (CBS).

In 2009, Fennell composed/produced songs and the underscore for the film King of the Avenue.

== Current work ==
Fennell is currently the co-founder and co-owner of the company Musations. The company released the social media/music app Musations in July 2014. The app consequently charted at #3 in the Apple AppStore's free music downloads.

His current band the Nu Wave toured the US in 2025.

== Partial discography ==
- Big Noise - Bang (1989)
- Ultravox - "Vienna 92" (1992)
- Ultravox - Revelation (1993)
- Gerry Laffy - Sheer Greed
- Luxx - Luxx
- Luxx - Hydroponic
- Bear in the Big Blue House
- Scarlette Fever - Medication Time
- Brenda Edwards - Bring It Back
- Enuff Znuff - Diamond Boy (2018)
