= Eric Gast =

- Born: 23 April 1968 (age 56)
- Origin: Manhattan, NY
- Genres: Rock, Pop, Gospel, International, Hip hop, Soundtracks
- Occupation(s): Producer, Mixer, Engineer, Charity CEO and Founder
- Labels: FM Records
- Website: http://legacyofhopeconcerts.org

Eric M. Gast (born 23 April 1968) is an American music industry professional – record producer, mixer, engineer, and recording studio designer – and founder and CEO of a nonprofit public health care charity. Gast was born in New Jersey and raised in New York City. He is cousin to documentary filmmaker Leon Gast. as well as another cousin Eric W. Gast former athlete and model

== Music business career ==
Gast was managed by Zomba Music Group from 1989 to 2000, working with artists such as A Tribe Called Quest, Billy Ocean, Kid Rock, Will Smith, Britney Spears, and Enuff Z'nuff.

Since 2000 he has been a freelance producer and engineer, expanding to broader musical styles such as jazz, gospel, and world music recordings. In these veins, Eric worked with artists such as James Moody, Jonathan Butler, Charlie Parker tribute album, John P. Kee, and Cissy Houston.

In 2003, he started FM For Music LLC, a production and management company. FM not only managed Gast, but also several other producers and engineers.

He has contracted and designed studios in Atlantic City, Florida, and Brussels.

He also has worked on numerous movie soundtracks over his career. After working with soundtrack projects in Eastern Europe, Eric opened label/media companies in the Czech Republic, Hungary, and Romania.

== Charity ==
Gast always wanted to give back to the communities in which he worked. As time progressed in his charity work, Eric decided to enlist the medical community and to expand his vision. He then started Legacy of Hope.
