= Enuff Z'nuff (album) =

Enuff Z'Nuff

Studio album by Enuff Z'Nuff
- Released: August 18, 1989
- Studio: Royal Recorders, Lake Geneva, Wisconsin
- Genre: Glam metal; power pop
- Length: 42:47
- Label: Atco
- Producer: Enuff Z'Nuff, Ron Fajerstein

Enuff Z'Nuff chronology
Enuff Z'Nuff (1989)	Strength (1991)

Singles from "Enuff Z'Nuff"
- 1. "New Thing" Released: 1989; 2. "Fly High Michelle" Released: 1990; 3. "For Now" Released: 1990

Professional ratings
Review scores
Source	Rating
AllMusic	3/5 stars
Collector's Guide to Heavy Metal	8/10
Rolling Stone	3/5 stars

Enuff Z'Nuff is the debut studio album by American glam metal band Enuff Z'Nuff, released on August 18, 1989, through Atco Records. This debut album continues to be the best selling album in the band's catalog. The album's first single, "New Thing", received steady radio and MTV airplay, peaking at No. 67 on the Billboard Hot 100. Their follow-up single, a ballad called "Fly High Michelle," would prove to be the band's biggest hit, peaking at No. 47 on the same chart. Promotional CDs were created for another song, a ballad called "For Now," but this single was apparently cancelled while the band focused on their follow-up record, 1991's Strength. By 1991 the album had sold 300,000 copies.

Additional exposure for the album occurred with the album tracks "Hot Little Summer Girl" and "I Could Never Be Without You" being featured on the popular TV shows Beverly Hills, 90210 and Northern Exposure. A few years later, the band's glam appearance in their video for "Fly High Michelle" would be parodied on MTV's Beavis & Butt-head.

The video for "New Thing" was placed on New York Times list of the 15 Essential Hair-Metal Videos.

== Track listing ==
Credits adapted from the original CD release. All songs written by Donnie Vie and Chip Z'Nuff, except where noted.

1. "New Thing" – 4:22
2. "She Wants More" – 4:39
3. "Fly High Michelle" (Vie) – 4:17
4. "Hot Little Summer Girl" (Vie, Ron Fajerstein) – 2:57
5. "In the Groove" – 6:49
6. "Little Indian Angel" – 3:30
7. "For Now" – 4:29
8. "Kiss the Clown" (Vie) – 3:16
9. "I Could Never Be Without You" (Vie) – 3:43
10. "Finger on the Trigger" (Vie, Derek Frigo) – 4:45

== Personnel ==
Enuff Z'Nuff

- Donnie Vie – lead vocals, rhythm guitar and keyboards
- Derek Frigo – lead guitar
- Chip Z'Nuff – bass, guitars and vocals
- Vikki Fox – drums

Production

- Ron Fajerstein – producer
- Dan Harjung – engineer
- Rich Denhart – additional engineering
- Michael Koppelman, Dave Kent – assistant engineers
- Paul Lani – mixing
- George Marino – mastering at Sterling Sound, New York
- Bob Defrin – art direction

== Charts ==
Chart (1989)	Peak position
US Billboard 200	74
