= Enuff Z'Nuff =

American glam metal band

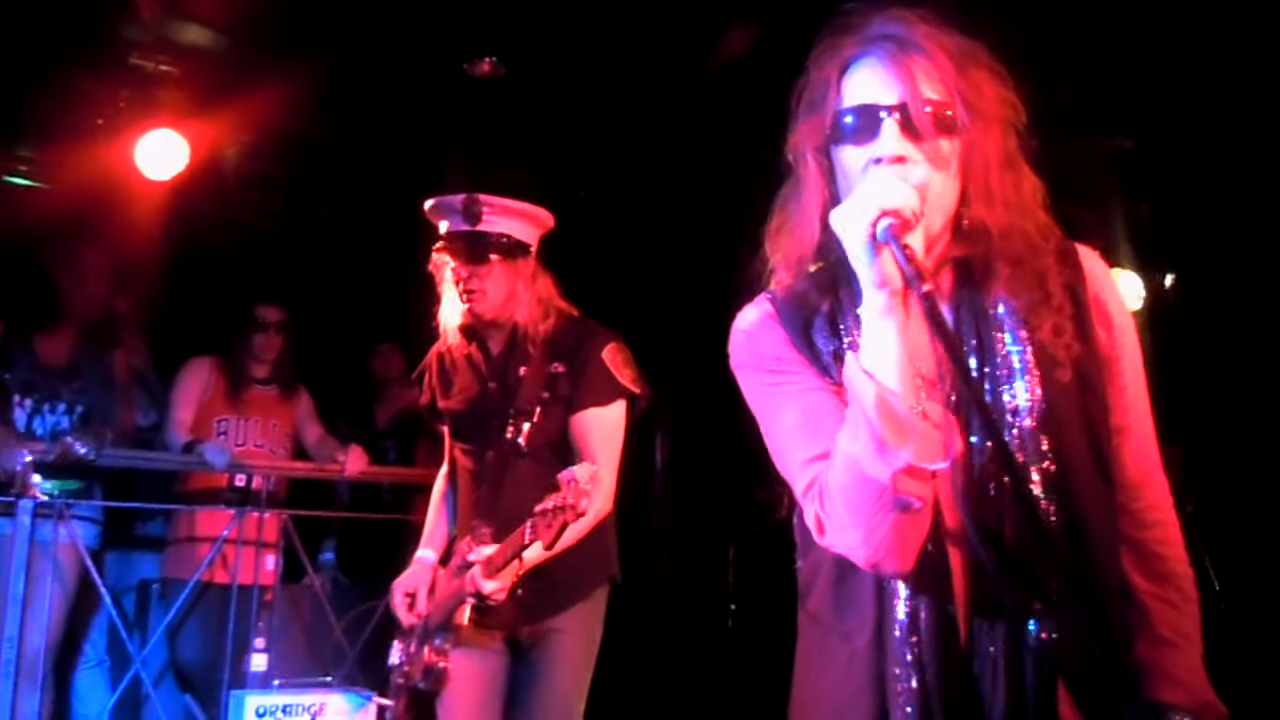
- Founding members Chip Z'Nuff and Donnie Vie

Background information
- Also known as: Enough's Enough, Enough Z'Nuff.
- Origin: Blue Island, Illinois, U.S.
- Genres: Glam metal; hard rock; power pop; psychedelic rock
- Works: Discography
- Years active: 1984–present
- Labels: Atco; Arista; Big Deal; Mayhem; Spitfire; Perris; Stoney; Frontiers; Deadline
- Members: Chip Z'Nuff Jason K. Herman Chris Densky; Luis Kalil
- Past members: B.W. Boeski Gino Martino Pete Comita Alex Kane Derek Frigo Vikki Foxx Ricky Parent Donnie Vie Johnny Monaco Randi Scott Michael Richards Erik Donner Tony Fennell Daniel B. Hill Tory Stoffregen
- Website: enuffznuff.com

Enuff Z'Nuff (a sensational spelling of "enough's enough") is an American glam metal band from Blue Island, Illinois, founded by singer Donnie Vie and bassist Chip Z'Nuff. The band charted two times on the US Billboard Hot 100: "Fly High Michelle" (No. 47) and "New Thing" (No. 67).

The Chicago-area band has continually recorded and toured throughout their career of more than 30 years, releasing 18 studio albums and 28 official recordings to date. Their songs have been recorded by several other musicians, including Paul Gilbert, the Wildhearts, and Nelson. The group has appeared on MTV, The Howard Stern Show and the Late Show with David Letterman. Their music has been released on the major labels Atco Records and Arista Records, as well as several independent label releases.

In 2020, Jeff Mezydlo of Yardbarker included them in his list of "the 20 greatest hair metal bands of all time".

== History ==
=== Formation (1984–1989) ===
Enuff Z'Nuff formed in 1984 as "Enough Z'Nuff." The band soon grew a live following and recorded their first demo songs, some of which would be officially released later in their career. The band's first single, "Fingers On It", received some minor recognition when it was featured in the 1986 movie Henry: Portrait of a Serial Killer. Band members during this period also included drummer B.W. Boeski and guitarists Gino Martino and Alex Kane, the latter of whom moved on to lead guitars for Life, Sex & Death and eventually formed the band AntiProduct.

=== Major label recordings (1989–1993) ===
By 1989, Enough Z'Nuff had revised their band name to "Enuff Z'Nuff" and released their first major label offering, a self-titled debut album on Atco Records. For this recording, founding members Donnie Vie and Chip Z'Nuff were joined by ex-Le Mans guitarist Derek Frigo and drummer Vikki Foxx. The band had two charting hits with the psychedelic-flavored pop rock songs "New Thing" and "Fly High Michelle", both of which received steady airplay on MTV. A few years later, the band's heavy glam rock appearance in the music videos would be parodied on Beavis & Butthead.

Frontman Donnie Vie has expressed disappointment that the label marketed the group as a glam metal act during this period instead of as a power pop group, which he considered to be a better descriptor of their sound, and suggested that the group would have retained their popularity had they been promoted as such.

For their follow-up album, 1991's Strength, the band consciously toned down their glam image. Strength was released in 1991 on Atco to strong reviews, including Rolling Stone magazine calling the group "The Hot Band of the Year." There were promotional videos for the singles "Mother's Eyes" and "Baby Loves You", as well as an appearance on the Late Show with David Letterman. However, this follow-up album did not sell nearly as well as their first.

The band filed for bankruptcy and left Atco Records, but soon after was picked up by Clive Davis' Arista Records label for their 1993 album Animals with Human Intelligence. Before this album's release, drummer Vikki Foxx quit the band to join Vince Neil's solo band. Foxx would be airbrushed out of the album cover, despite performing on each track of the recording. Foxx was replaced by New Jersey resident and former War and Peace member Ricky Parent, who also appeared for most of the album's promotional material. The band performed on Letterman again and shot a video for the single "Right by Your Side". However this release, much like Strength, received some critical acclaim but ultimately disappointed commercially.

=== Independent albums and Donnie's departure (1993–2006) ===
A short time after Enuff Z'Nuff parted ways from Arista Records, guitarist Derek Frigo left the band, though he still recorded on occasion with them. Despite this setback, the band continued touring and recording, releasing albums on several indie labels and finding a solid fanbase overseas. Some notable events include many appearances on The Howard Stern Show, local appearances on the Mancow's Morning Madhouse radio program, a 1998 performance on The Jenny Jones Show, a pair of features on VH1 about hair bands in 1999, and attaining an opening slot for Poison's 2001 "Glam Slam Metal Jam" tour.

Lead singer and songwriter Donnie Vie stopped touring with the group in 2002 out of frustration and to embark upon a solo career. Enuff Z'Nuff continued to tour in his absence as a "3-piece," with their lead guitarist Johnny Monaco also serving as the band's lead singer. Despite not touring, Vie would still write and record with the band in future studio releases.

On May 28, 2004, former lead guitarist Derek Frigo died from an apparent drug overdose at the age of 37, soon after the band planned a Japanese tour with the original line-up. Another tragedy struck when the band's drummer Ricky Parent lost his long-time battle with cancer in October 2007. Parent had been with the band for approximately 12 years.

=== Reformation and Vie's second departure (2006–2013) ===
In 2006, original members Chip Z'Nuff and Donnie Vie reconvened to shoot a pilot for the VH1 reality television show, Bands on the Run. The show's pilot episode never aired. However, during that time the reunited band held their initial recording sessions for their 12th record. Several songs from these sessions eventually helped create their studio album, Dissonance, which also features former Ozzy Osbourne / Badlands guitarist Jake E. Lee on guitar. With Vie rejoining the live shows in 2008, Dissonance was released in 2009 in Japan, with a U.K. release following in 2010. In support of the album, Enuff Z'Nuff toured both Japan and Europe, including the Download Festival in the U.K. As of May 2013, Donnie Vie once again left the band. Johnny Monaco returned to Enuff Z'Nuff as the band's singer.

=== Recent activity, Chip on lead vocals (since 2014) ===
There was more band member shuffling in May 2014 when guitarist Tory Stoffregen and drummer Randi Scott each left the band. Drummer Erik Donner joined on drums in June, while Enuff Z'Nuff continued touring as a 3-piece. In April 2016, Metal Sludge confirmed via an interview with Johnny Monaco that he is no longer in the band. The band continued with Chip Z'nuff as the lead singer, Tory Stoffregen back on lead guitar, Tony Fenelle (Ultravox) on guitar and Daniel B. Hill on drums.

Enuff Z'nuff released an album of older, previously unreleased original material on Frontiers Records in late 2016, titled Clowns Lounge. It mainly features demo material from studio sessions originally recorded in 1988 and 1989. Enuff Z'nuff released an album of new material with Chip Z'nuff on lead vocals, Diamond Boy, in 2018 on the Frontiers label. It was their first recording without contributions from former Enuff Z'nuff singer/songwriter Donnie Vie. Vie is still active musically and created a PledgeMusic campaign for his latest solo album, which released July 15, 2019. On March 11, 2019, guitarist Tony Fennell announced his departure from the band in a statement that was posted on the band's Facebook page. He was replaced by Alex Kane, a previous Enuff Z'nuff band member who had played with the band before their first major label breakthrough.

Enuff Z'Nuff continues to release new recordings. In August 2021, a three-CD set of formerly unreleased demo recordings titled Never Enuff was released through Cleopatra Records. The newest Enuff Z'Nuff album, Xtra Cherries, was released on July 18, 2025 on the same record label.

In 2025, Enuff Z'Nuff were inducted into the Illinois Rock & Roll Hall of Fame. During the ceremony, former frontman Donnie Vie rejoined the band on stage for the first time since 2013 to perform New Thing and Fly High Michelle.

== Musical style ==
Enuff Z'Nuff's music is a combination of glam metal, hard rock, power pop, and psychedelic rock.

== Discography ==
- Enuff Z'Nuff (1989)
- Strength (1991)
- Animals with Human Intelligence (1993)
- 1985 (1994)
- Tweaked (1995)
- Peach Fuzz (1996)
- Seven (1997)
- Paraphernalia (1999)
- 10 (2000)
- Welcome to Blue Island (2003)
- ? (2004)
- Dissonance (2009)
- Clowns Lounge (2016)
- Diamond Boy (2018)
- Brainwashed Generation (2020)
- Hardrock Nite (2021)
- Finer than Sin (2022)
- Xtra Cherries (2025)

== Band members ==
Current members

- Chip Z'Nuff – bass, rhythm guitar (1984–present), lead vocals (2016–present), backing vocals (1984–2016)
- Jason Camino – rhythm & lead guitar (2023–present)
- Luis Kalil – lead & rhythm guitar (2025–present)
- Daxx Nielsen – drums (2025–present)

== See also ==
- List of Arista Records artists
- List of glam metal bands and artists
- List of power pop artists and songs
