= Strength (Enuff Z'nuff album) =

- Original album artwork by Mark Ryden

Studio album by Enuff Z'nuff
- Released: March 26, 1991
- Recorded: 1990–1991
- Studios: Music Grinder, Hollywood, California, Chicago Recording Company, Chicago, Illinois
- Genre: Glam metal
- Length: 57:54
- Label: Atco
- Producers: Paul Lani, Donnie Vie and Chip Z'Nuff

Enuff Z'nuff chronology
Enuff Z'nuff (1989)	Strength (1991)	Animals with Human Intelligence (1993)

Singles from "Strength"
- 1. "Mother's Eyes" Released: 1991; 2. "Baby Loves You" Released: 1991

Strength is the second studio album by the American rock band Enuff Z'nuff, released in 1991. The band had positive momentum at the time of the album's release, including an appearance on the Late Show with David Letterman, as well as Rolling Stone calling them "The Hot Band of 1991." Although Strength quickly entered the British charts at No. 56, the album peaked at only No. 143 in the United States.

In 2007, lead singer and guitarist of Enuff Z'nuff, Donnie Vie, released the album Extra Strength, an acoustic reworking of the 1991 recording. Strength was re-issued June 2011 in Japan on the SHM-CD format.

== Critical reception ==
Professional ratings
Review scores
Source	Rating
AllMusic	4.5/5 stars
Calgary Herald	B
Chicago Tribune	3/4 stars
Collector's Guide to Heavy Metal	9/10
The Encyclopedia of Popular Music	4/5 stars
Entertainment Weekly	C+
MusicHound Rock: The Essential Album Guide	3.5/5 stars
The Rolling Stone Album Guide	4/5 stars

The Encyclopedia of Popular Music called the album "an impressive and mature musical offering that combined infectious hooks, abrasive guitar work and a sparkling production to dramatic effect." The Washington Post wrote that it "is actually quite likable, with a melodic flair that renders such songs as 'Heaven or Hell' and 'Blue Island' as agreeable as, say, middling Badfinger." The Province thought that "as the hair drops and the lip gloss is wiped away, Enuff Z'Nuff slowly is letting its real personality show - a group that really wants to be the hard rock equivalent of The Beatles or, failing that, the glam-rock Cheap Trick or, at least, the bastard children of Slade and The Raspberries."

== Track listing ==
Credits adapted from the original release.

All tracks are written by Donnie Vie and Chip Z'Nuff, except where noted.

No.	Title	Length
1.	"Heaven or Hell"	3:45
2.	"Missing You"	5:10
3.	"Strength" (Vie)	5:02
4.	"In Crowd"	3:08
5.	"Holly Wood Ya"	3:06
6.	"The World Is a Gutter" (Vie)	3:52
7.	"Goodbye"	4:26
8.	"Long Way to Go" (Vie)	1:53
9.	"Mother's Eyes" (Vie, Derek Frigo)	4:37
10.	"Baby Loves You"	4:07
11.	"Blue Island" (Vie)	4:45
12.	"The Way Home / Coming Home"	5:36
13.	"Something for Free"	5:31
14.	"Time to Let You Go" (Vie)	2:56

== Personnel ==
Enuff Z'nuff

- Donnie Vie – lead vocals, guitars, keyboards, piano, producer
- Derek Frigo – lead guitar
- Chip Z'Nuff – bass guitars, guitars, vocals, producer
- Vikki Foxx – drums

Additional musicians

- Johnny Frigo – violin and viola (tracks 3 & 7)
- Dennis Karmazyn – cello (tracks 3 & 7)
- Paul Lani – mellotron (tracks 3 & 12)

Production

- Paul Lani – producer, mixing at The Hit Factory, New York City
- Lawrence Ethan, Steve Heinke – engineers
- Bruce Brekenfeld, John Armstrong – additional engineering
- Andy Grassi, Carl Glanville, Dave Mauragas – assistant engineers
- Bob Ludwig – mastering at Masterdisk, New York City
- Bob Defrin – art direction

== Charts ==
Chart (1991)	Peak position
US Billboard 200	143
