= Arista Records =

American record label

- Logo used since 2018
- Parent company: Sony Music Entertainment (2008–2011, 2018–present); Previous: Columbia Pictures (1974–1979); Ariola Records (1979–1985); Bertelsmann Music Group (1985–2004); Sony BMG Music Entertainment (2004–2008)
- Founded: 1974; 52 years ago (original); 2018; 8 years ago (revival)
- Founder: Clive Davis
- Defunct: 2011 (original; later re-constituted)
- Distributors: Sony Music Entertainment; Legacy Recordings (reissues)
- Genre: Various
- Country of origin: United States
- Location: New York City, U.S.
- Official website: aristarecordings.com

Arista Records (/ˈærɪstə/ ARR-ist-ə) is an American record label owned by Sony Music Entertainment, a subsidiary of Sony Music Group, a subsidiary of the Japanese conglomerate Sony Group Corporation. The label was previously a division of Columbia Pictures and later Bertelsmann Music Group, the North American division of German conglomerate Bertelsmann. Founded in November 1974 by Clive Davis and deactivated in 2011, Arista was re-established in 2018. Along with RCA Records, Columbia Records, and Epic Records, it is one of Sony Music's four flagship record labels.

== History ==
=== Background ===
Logo used from 1979 until its initial dissolution in 2011

After being fired from CBS Records, Clive Davis was recruited by Alan Hirschfield, then-CEO of Columbia Pictures, in June 1974 to be a consultant for the company's record and music operations. Shortly after his hiring by CPI, Davis became president of Bell Records, replacing the departing Larry Uttal.

Davis's real goal was to reorganize and revitalize Columbia Pictures's music division. With a $10 million investment by CPI, and a reorganization of the various Columbia Pictures legacy labels (Colpix, Colgems, SGC and Bell Records), Davis introduced Columbia Pictures' new record division, Arista Records, in November 1974, ultimately owning 20 percent of the company.

The label was named after Arista, New York City's public secondary school honor society (of which Davis was a member at Erasmus Hall High School).

In early 1975, most of the artists who had been signed to Bell were let go, including David Cassidy (who left for RCA Records), Tony Orlando and Dawn (who left for Elektra Records), and the 5th Dimension (which departed for ABC Records). Others, such as Suzi Quatro and Hot Chocolate, were farmed out to the Bell/Arista-distributed label, Big Tree. Several Bell acts, such as Barry Manilow, the Bay City Rollers, and Melissa Manchester continued with Arista.

The British Bell label kept that name for a couple of years before changing its name to Arista. The label was mentioned in the 1978 Nick Lowe song "They Called It Rock", in the lyric, "Arista says they love you/But the kids can't dance to this."

Arista signed the Grateful Dead in 1976, and the group released their only Top 40 pop hit, "Touch of Grey", on the label in 1987. In addition to Outlaws, Patti Smith, Eric Carmen, Air Supply, the Kinks, Lou Reed, Alan Parsons and Dionne Warwick, Arista signed Aretha Franklin in 1980, after her long relationship with Atlantic Records ended. The label's most significant acquisition came in 1983 when Davis signed Whitney Houston. Houston would become Arista's biggest-selling recording act and one of the best-selling acts in music history with sales of over 220 million records worldwide, according to the Recording Industry Association of America (RIAA).

=== Subsidiary imprint labels ===
Arista had an imprint label in the 1970s called Arista Novus, which focused on contemporary jazz artists. It distributed two other jazz labels, Arista Freedom, which specialized in avant-garde jazz and, until 1982, GRP Records, which specialized in contemporary jazz and what came to be known as smooth jazz. A country music division, Career Records, was merged into the Arista Nashville division in 1997. Arista Austin was used in the late 1990s as a country label. Arista Texas (later Arista Latin) was used in the mid to late 1990s as a Tejano/Regional Mexican label. Additionally, Arista was the U.S. distributor of Jive Records from 1981 until 1987. During the 1990s, Arista also distributed Logic, Rowdy and Heavenly Recordings.

=== Corporate history ===
Amid a broader corporate restructuring, Columbia Pictures sold Arista to German-based Ariola Records, a unit of Bertelsmann, on July 27, 1979; the acquisition was completed on October 1 of that year. In 1983, Bertelsmann sold a 50% interest in Arista to RCA Records. In 1985, RCA and Bertelsmann merged their music operations to form RCA/Ariola International, with RCA owning 75% and Bertelsmann the remaining 25%.

After General Electric absorbed the RCA Corporation in 1986, GE sold off various RCA assets, including all of its interest in RCA/Ariola to Bertelsmann, and it was renamed Bertelsmann Music Group, though Arista's U.S. releases would not note BMG until 1987. That year, in 1987, Arista Records formed a home video subsidiary, 6 West Home Video, in order to release home video titles on Arista Records' musical catalog, and the initial release, which served as the first title for the 6 West Home Video division was a one-hour performance on The Grateful Dead, So Far, with an October release and a list price of $29.95.

Into the 1980s, Arista continued its success, including major UK act Secret Affair. Over the years it acquired Northwestside Records, deConstruction Records, First Avenue Records, and Dedicated Records in the UK. In 1989, Arista entered into a joint venture with Antonio "L.A." Reid and Babyface in the creation of LaFace Records, record company of Toni Braxton, Usher, Outkast, and TLC, which it acquired in 1999. In 1993, Arista also entered into a joint-venture with Sean "Puffy" Combs to form Bad Boy Records. In 1997, Arista acquired Profile Records, the home of Run-D.M.C. and Poor Righteous Teachers.

=== Milli Vanilli controversy ===
In 1989, Arista Records signed Milli Vanilli, a contemporary R&B duo consisting of Rob Pilatus and Fab Morvan that was based in Germany. The label released its debut album, Girl You Know It's True, which was a remixed and re-edited version of All or Nothing, which had been out in Europe the previous year. The album was certified sextuple platinum in the U.S., and charted five top-ten singles, three of them reaching the number one position. In 1990, Milli Vanilli won two American Music Awards and a Grammy Award for Best New Artist.

Carol Decker, lead singer of the band T'Pau, was interviewed after their performance on MTV and said that Milli Vanilli had used a Synclavier and were not singing. Later that year, Frank Farian, producer of Milli Vanilli, confirmed that the duo had not performed a single note on their album.

This revelation caused a huge firestorm in the music industry, as recording artists, particularly bubblegum pop acts that heavily relied on electronic processing and overdubbing (what they referred to as "studio magic"), were now under scrutiny and subsequently forced to cut back on lip-synching to show that they were authentic. Milli Vanilli's Grammy Award was subsequently revoked. Clive Davis promptly released the duo from its contract and deleted the album and its masters from their catalogue—making Girl You Know It's True the largest-selling album to be deleted.

A court ruling in the U.S. allowed anyone who had bought the album to get a refund.

In response to the scandal, Arista's position was that the company had been completely unaware of Morvan and Pilatus having not themselves recorded their album. In a post-debacle interview, Morvan defended himself for his part in the deception by saying: "[Before Milli Vanilli] I was working at a McDonald's. What would you have done?"

=== Reconstructing Arista and the L.A. Reid years ===
At the end of the year 2000, following its 25th anniversary, BMG fired Davis as president/CEO due to age restrictions. Although Davis was still one of the most successful record heads in the entire music industry, BMG had an age restriction policy. L.A. Reid succeeded Davis as Arista's president/CEO.

Under Reid, the label had success with newer acts such as Avril Lavigne, Pink, and Kelis, but struggled with newer releases by more established acts already on the label. Reid seemed to lose focus and have many miscalculations when it came to promoting Arista's established acts such as TLC, Toni Braxton, Whitney Houston (Houston being BMG's biggest selling act out of all BMG labels), and several other acts.

Reid seemed to put more money in promoting newer acts and less money into promoting established acts. Whitney Houston's December 2002, Just Whitney, as well as her November 2003 album One Wish: The Holiday Album failed to achieve the same success as her previous albums with Davis as head of Arista. Reid's extravagant spending, meanwhile, and lower sales of big-name established acts under his tenure, caused Arista to lose money. In two years, with Reid as CEO of Arista, Arista lost over $100 million.

After BMG and Sony Music Entertainment merged in 2004, Reid was fired in January of that year. Arista, always an independently managed front line label at BMG, was merged with J Records in August 2005; J Records being the label that Davis started after being fired by BMG.

The merged Arista and J record labels began operating under the newly formed RCA Music Group—of which Davis was re-instated as CEO after the merger of BMG and Sony, thus Davis once again became in control of Arista and several other labels from the very company that previously fired him.

The Arista label continued to be used for new releases, although heavily scaled back, while its reissues are released through Sony Music's Legacy Recordings. Also, as a result of the Sony-BMG merger, Arista once again became related to Columbia Pictures, which is fully owned by the Sony Corporation of America (through Sony Pictures Entertainment) – who would buy out BMG's share in 2008.

=== Dissolution and revival ===
After the Sony-BMG merger, LaFace Records was eventually revived; the label was now fully owned by Sony-BMG and began operating as part of the Jive Label Group.

During the summer of 2011, the RCA Music Group underwent a restructuring that saw the elimination of the Arista name later on that year, along with sister labels J Records and Jive. RCA Records started releasing all RCA Music Group releases under RCA Records. Arista Nashville continued to operate through Sony Music Nashville and was not affected by the closing of Arista Records.

Arista Records France was founded in September 2012, making it initially the last active remnant of the label. In 2023, Sony Music France closed Arista Records France, with the existing roster transferring to other labels under Sony's ownership.

In July 2018, it was announced that Arista would be revived as a frontline label, making it now the fourth flagship record label under Sony Music alongside Columbia, RCA, and Epic. The company hired former Island Records president/CEO David Massey to lead Arista. The label signed Mike Posner ahead of his new album in 2025.

In May 2024, Arista Records officially promoted Kendell Freeman to Senior Vice President of A&R.

On June 22, 2026, Arista Records founder Clive Davis died at 94 years of age.

== Arista Nashville ==
In 1989, Arista Records launched Arista Nashville, which specializes in country music artists. Alan Jackson was the first act signed label. In 1995, Arista Nashville launched a subsidiary label known as Career Records, the roster of which at the time included Brett James, Tammy Graham, and Lee Roy Parnell. Currently, Arista Nashville falls under the wing of Sony Music Nashville, hosting such artists as Carrie Underwood, Ronnie Dunn and Jerrod Niemann.

In March 2023, Arista Nashville was closed, with its roster reassigned under other Sony Music labels.

== See also ==
- Arista Records artists
- Arista Nashville
- List of record labels
