= M.O.L. (video) =

M.O.L. (Meaning of Life)

Video by Disturbed
- Released: March 4, 2002
- Recorded: 2000–2001
- Genre: Nu metal, alternative metal
- Length: 150:00
- Label: Warner Reprise Video
- Producer: D.O.B., Matt Caltabiano, Angela Smith

Professional ratings
Review scores
Source	Rating
AllMusic	3/5 stars

M.O.L. is a video album by American heavy metal band Disturbed, released on DVD in 2002. It is a documentary showing the band while in studio and touring, and features interviews with members of the band. It also contains music videos and live performances of songs from Disturbed's debut album The Sickness. Two other songs are also included – a music video for the demo version of "Perfect Insanity" and a non-album track titled "A Welcome Burden", which later appeared on the 10th anniversary edition of The Sickness.

M.O.L. stands for Meaning of Life, a song from The Sickness. It is not featured on this DVD, except for in-between chapters, where it is briefly played in the background.

== Track listing ==
List of selectable tracks, both in produced video and live concert form, that are available:

1. "Want" (live)
2. "Conflict" (live)
3. "Stupify" (music video)
4. "Fear" (live)
5. "Voices" (music video)
6. "Droppin' Plates" (live)
7. "Shout 2000" (live)
8. "Down with the Sickness" (music video)
9. "The Game" (live)

Special features

1. Photo Shoot
2. "Perfect Insanity"
3. Band Origin
4. Worst Venue
5. In the Studio Part 1
6. In the Studio Part 2
7. "A Welcome Burden"
8. In the Studio Part 3
9. Fuzz
10. Mike
11. Dan
12. Concert & Audio Set Up

== Personnel ==
=== Disturbed ===
- David Draiman – vocals
- Dan Donegan – guitar
- Steve "Fuzz" Kmak – bass
- Mike Wengren – drums

=== Production ===
- Director – Nathan Cox
- Producers – D.O.B., Matt Caltabiano, Angela Smith
- Director (live performance) – Atom Rothlein
- Producer (live performance) – Jennifer Rothlein
- Producer (live music) – David May

== Certifications ==
Region	Certification	Certified units/sales
Australia (ARIA)	Platinum	15,000^{^}
^{^} Shipments figures based on certification alone.
