= The Sickness 25th Anniversary Tour =

- Tour by Disturbed
- Location: Asia; Australia; Europe; North America
- Start date: February 25, 2025
- End date: May 25, 2027
- Legs: 3
- No. of shows: 63
- Supporting acts: Daughtry; Megadeath; Three Days Grace; Nothing More
- Website: disturbed1.com

Disturbed concert chronology
- Take Back Your Life Tour (2023–2024); The Sickness 25th Anniversary Tour (2025–2027)

The Sickness 25th Anniversary Tour is the ninth concert tour by the American heavy metal band Disturbed featuring David Draiman (vocals), Dan Donegan (guitar), John Moyer (bass), Mike Wengren (drums). Original bassist Steve “Fuzz” Kmak also appeared for The Sickness portion at the Chicago show; in celebration of the 25th anniversary for their 5x platinum debut album The Sickness. The tour began on the 25th of February, 2025 in Nampa Idaho, United States, and is set to conclude in Manila, Philippines, on May 25, 2027. The tour was crafted in two sets, one show – The Sickness in its entirety and the band's greatest hits. The tour encompassed 63 tour dates that touched in Asia, Australia, Europe, New Zealand and North America, with special guest/supporting act sets by Three Days Grace, Sevendust, Megadeath, Daughtry, and Nothing More.

== Background ==
On October 10, 2024, Disturbed announced the 25th anniversary tour for their debut album The Sickness on their social media and band website. A re-issue of the album was also announced that consisted with 40 tracks, which includes the original album, B-sides, unreleased demos, rarities, and more. Special edition box-sets & LP's were also released alongside the re-issue. First access early bird tickets were offered through signup's on Disturbed.Live & Disturbed1.com on Monday, October 14, 2024. General sale began on Friday October 18th through Ticketmaster. Three different tiers of VIP packages were available throughout the presale & general sale period, VIP 1 - 'Voices' tier that had an exclusive meet & greet with the band alongside exclusive memorabilia and priority check-in, VIP 2 - 'Down With The Sickness' tier which offered priority check-in and GA entry & VIP 3 'Stupify' tier which offered priority seating in the best section of the venue, exclusive merchandise & access to fan-zones and memorabilia. The UK/EU dates were announced February 24, 2025 via the bands website.

== Critical reception ==
The tour received highly positive reviews from critics, who praised the charisma and unwavering energy of the show and Disturbed's David Draiman's overall dominance on the mic and stage.

Reviewing the tour's show in Chicago at the United Center, Bobby Talamine from JBTVMusic wrote The show, front to back- high energy, and not just with Disturbed (which is obviously a given). All three bands came to play caffeinated. High energy alerts throughout.

== Set list ==
This set list is representative of the show in Denver, on February 27, 2025. It is not representative of all concerts for the duration of the tour.

1. Voices
2. The Game
3. Stupify
4. Down With the Sickness
5. Violence Fetish
6. Fear
7. Numb
8. Want
9. Conflict
10. Shout
11. Droppin' Plates
12. Meaning of Life
13. Ten Thousand Fists
14. I Will Not Break
15. Bad Man
16. Land of Confusion
17. Indestructible
18. The Sound of Silence
19. The Light
20. Inside the Fire

== Tour dates ==
=== List of 2025 concerts ===
Date (2025)	City	Country	Venue	Opening acts
February 25	Nampa, ID	United States	Ford Idaho Center Arena*	* Three Days Grace, Sevendust^ Daughtry, Nothing More
February 27	Denver,CO	United States	Ball Arena*	* Three Days Grace, Sevendust^ Daughtry, Nothing More
March 2	St. Louis, MO	United States	Enterprise Center*	* Three Days Grace, Sevendust^ Daughtry, Nothing More
March 4	Milwaukee, WI	United States	Fiserv Forum*	* Three Days Grace, Sevendust^ Daughtry, Nothing More
March 6	Minneapolis, MN	United States	Target Center*	* Three Days Grace, Sevendust^ Daughtry, Nothing More
March 8	Chicago, IL	United States	United Center*	* Three Days Grace, Sevendust^ Daughtry, Nothing More
March 10	Detroit, MI	United States	Little Caesars Arena*	* Three Days Grace, Sevendust^ Daughtry, Nothing More
March 12	Louisville, KY	United States	KFC Yum! Center*	* Three Days Grace, Sevendust^ Daughtry, Nothing More
March 14	Boston, MA	United States	TD Garden*	* Three Days Grace, Sevendust^ Daughtry, Nothing More
March 17	Washington, DC	United States	Capital One Arena*	* Three Days Grace, Sevendust^ Daughtry, Nothing More
March 19	Montreal, QC	United States	Centre Bell*	* Three Days Grace, Sevendust^ Daughtry, Nothing More
March 21	New York, NY	United States	Madison Square Garden*	* Three Days Grace, Sevendust^ Daughtry, Nothing More
March 29	Cincinnati, OH	United States	Heritage Bank Center^	* Three Days Grace, Sevendust^ Daughtry, Nothing More
March 31	Cleveland, OH	United States	Rocket Mortgage FieldHouse^	* Three Days Grace, Sevendust^ Daughtry, Nothing More
April 2	Philadelphia, PA	United States	Wells Fargo Center^	* Three Days Grace, Sevendust^ Daughtry, Nothing More
April 4	Buffalo, NY	United States	KeyBank Center^	* Three Days Grace, Sevendust^ Daughtry, Nothing More
April 5	Pittsburgh, PA	United States	PPG Paints Arena^	* Three Days Grace, Sevendust^ Daughtry, Nothing More
April 7	Toronto, ON	United States	Scotiabank Arena^	* Three Days Grace, Sevendust^ Daughtry, Nothing More
April 9	Indianapolis, IN	United States	Gainbridge Fieldhouse^	* Three Days Grace, Sevendust^ Daughtry, Nothing More
April 12	Charlotte, NC	United States	Spectrum Center^	* Three Days Grace, Sevendust^ Daughtry, Nothing More
April 14	Raleigh, NC	United States	Lenovo Center^	* Three Days Grace, Sevendust^ Daughtry, Nothing More
April 16	Birmingham, AL	United States	Legacy Arena at The BJCC^	* Three Days Grace, Sevendust^ Daughtry, Nothing More
April 18	Sunrise, FL	United States	Amerant Bank Arena^	* Three Days Grace, Sevendust^ Daughtry, Nothing More
April 23	Duluth, GA	United States	Gas South Arena^	* Three Days Grace, Sevendust^ Daughtry, Nothing More
April 25	San Antonio, TX	United States	Frost Bank Center^	* Three Days Grace, Sevendust^ Daughtry, Nothing More
April 26	Fort Worth, TX	United States	Dickies Arena^	* Three Days Grace, Sevendust^ Daughtry, Nothing More
April 28	Oklahoma City, OK	United States	Paycom Center^	* Three Days Grace, Sevendust^ Daughtry, Nothing More
May 5	Seattle, WA	United States	Climate Pledge Arena^	* Three Days Grace, Sevendust^ Daughtry, Nothing More
May 7	Portland, OR	United States	Moda Center^	* Three Days Grace, Sevendust^ Daughtry, Nothing More
May 9	Sacramento, CA	United States	Golden 1 Center^	* Three Days Grace, Sevendust^ Daughtry, Nothing More
May 10	San Francisco, CA	United States	Chase Center^	* Three Days Grace, Sevendust^ Daughtry, Nothing More
May 13	Inglewood, CA	United States	Kia Forum^	* Three Days Grace, Sevendust^ Daughtry, Nothing More
May 15	Phoenix, AZ	United States	Footprint Center^	* Three Days Grace, Sevendust^ Daughtry, Nothing More
May 17	Las Vegas, NV	United States	MGM Grand Garden Arena^	* Three Days Grace, Sevendust^ Daughtry, Nothing More
Total		United States		* Three Days Grace, Sevendust^ Daughtry, Nothing More

List of EU/UK Tour Dates

Date (2025)	City	Country	Venue	Opening acts
September 28	Copenhagen	Denmark	Royal Arena	Megadeth
October 1	Dusseldorf	Germany	PSD Bank Dome	Megadeth
October 3	Stuttgart	Germany	Hanns-Martin-Schleyer-Halle	Megadeth
October 4	Zurich	Switzerland	Hallenstadion	Megadeth
October 6	Budapest	Hungary	Budapest Arena	Megadeth
October 7	Prague	Czech Republic	O2 Arena	Megadeth
October 10	Krakow	Poland	Tauron Arena	Megadeth
October 12	Paris	France	Zenith	Megadeth
October 14	Amsterdam	Netherlands	Ziggo Dome	Megadeth
October 15	Brussels	Belgium	Forest National	Megadeth
October 17	Munich	Germany	Olympiahalle	Megadeth
October 18	Berlin	Germany	Velodrome	Megadeth
October 20	Birmingham	England	Utilita Arena	Megadeth
October 22	Dublin	Ireland	3Arena	Megadeth
October 24	Manchester	England	AO Arena	Megadeth
October 26	London	England	The O2	Megadeth
October 28	Glasgow	Scotland	OVO Hydro	Megadeth

List of 2027 Australia, New Zealand & Asia concerts

Date (2027)	City	Country	Venue
April 22	Auckland	New Zealand	Spark Arena
April 24	Christchurch	New Zealand	Wolfbrook Arena
April 28	Brisbane	Australia	Brisbane Entertainment Centre
May 1	Sydney	Australia	Afterpay Arena
May 3	Adelaide	Australia	Adelaide Entertainment Centre
May 5	Melbourne	Australia	Rod Laver Arena
May 9	Perth	Australia	RAC Arena
May 13	Hong Kong		AsiaWorld–Expo
May 16	Bangkok	Thailand	UOB Live
May 19	Yokohama	Japan	Pia Arena MM
May 22	Taipei	Taiwan	Nangang Exhibition Center
May 25	Manila	Philippines	SM Mall of Asia Arena
