= Unstoppable (Disturbed song) =

2022 single by Disturbed

Single by Disturbed

from the album Divisive
- Released: September 23, 2022
- Length: 3:58
- Label: Reprise
- Songwriters: Dan Donegan; David Draiman; John Moyer; Mike Wengren
- Producer: WZRD BLD

Disturbed singles chronology
"Hey You" (2022)	"Unstoppable" (2022)	"Bad Man" (2022)

Music video
- "Unstoppable" on YouTube

"Unstoppable" is a song by American heavy metal band Disturbed. It is the second single and fourth track from their eighth album, Divisive. It reached No. 1 on the Billboard Mainstream Rock Airplay chart in August 2023.

== Background and release ==
"Unstoppable", the album's lead single, was released on September 23, 2022, when Disturbed announced their eighth studio album, Divisive. The song was also made available for streaming and played live for the first time on September 24, 2022, at Pine Knob Music Theatre in Clarkston, Michigan, during Riff Fest. The official music video was released on April 25, 2023. It depicts the band transforming into demonic figures.

== Composition ==
According to Blabbermouth.net, the song opens with pounding guitars, heavy drums and staccato vocals, followed by a stadium-ready chorus. Dan Donegan described it as a big rock anthem and an "in-your-face" track. Blabbermouth.net said the song recalls early Disturbed songs such as "Down with the Sickness" and "Stupify", with a heavily rhythmic sound and Draiman's angsty, staccato-like vocals. Metal Hammer described the track as anthemic, saying it delivers on Draiman's promise that the album would sit "somewhere between The Sickness and Ten Thousand Fists". Draiman also called the track "a bombastic animal" and "truly the fight song". He noted that it is one of the heavier songs on the album.

== Reception ==
Revolver described "Unstoppable" as a pounding, triumphant single and noted that it was the band's second heavy song since 2018. Consequence called it the album's "fight song", with Draiman's snarl backed by guitars and drums. Sputnikmusic said it was one of the songs most representative of the album's sound, featuring the classic rhythmic delivery the band is known for, energetic aggression, a minor industrial undercurrent, and strong choruses. Wall of Sound said it recycles key sounds from the band's earlier work with modern production and a fresh take. Kerrang! described it as big and brash with a diverting melody, but said it was only a highlight compared to most of the album and still fell short of the band's usual standards.

== Track listing ==
Unstoppable - by Disturbed Single
No.	Title	Length
1.	"Unstoppable"	3:58
2.	"Hey You" (Explicit)	4:28
Total length:		8:26

== Chart performance ==
It reached No. 1 on the Billboard Mainstream Rock Airplay chart in August 2023, their twelfth song to do so, and tying them for the fifth-most No. 1 singles in the chart's history.

== Personnel ==
Credits adapted from Apple Music.

Disturbed

- David Draiman – lead vocals, background vocals, songwriter
- Dan Donegan – guitar, background vocals, songwriter
- John Moyer – bass guitar, songwriter
- Mike Wengren – drums, percussion, background vocals, songwriter

Additional credits

- WZRD BLD – producer, mixing engineer, recording engineer

== Charts ==
=== Weekly charts ===
Weekly chart performance for "Unstoppable"
Chart (2023–2024)	Peak position
Canada Rock (Billboard)	29
Finland (Suomen virallinen lista)	67
US Rock & Alternative Airplay (Billboard)	7
US Mainstream Rock Airplay (Billboard)	1

=== Year-end charts ===
Year-end chart performance for "Unstoppable"
Chart (2023)	Position
US Rock & Alternative Airplay (Billboard)	37
US Mainstream Rock Airplay (Billboard)	14
