= Divisive =

Divisive may refer to:

- divisive clustering, which is a type of hierarchical clustering
- divisive rhythm
- Divide and rule
- Divisive, a 2022 studio album by Disturbed
