= List of awards and nominations received by Disturbed =

Disturbed awards and nominations
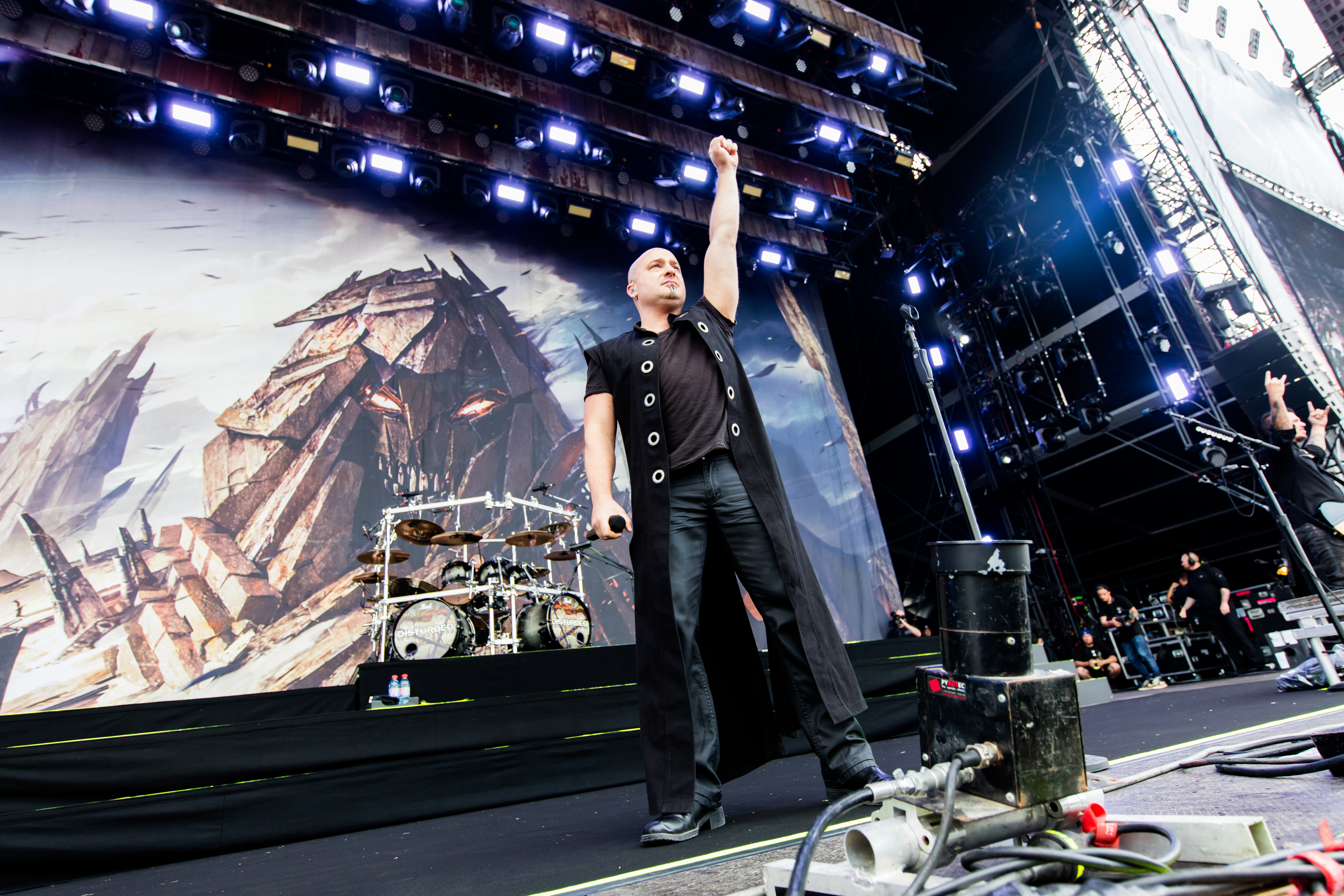
Awards and nominations
Award	Wins	Nominations
Billboard Music Awards	0	1
Grammy Awards	0	3
iHeartRadio Music Awards	1	5
Metal Hammer Golden Gods Awards	0	2
Revolver Golden Gods Awards	0	1
Loudwire Music Awards	4	15
Spike Guys' Choice Awards	1	1
SiriusXM Octane Music Awards	0	3
Octane’s Year-End Awards	1	1

Totals (Note: Certain award groups do not simply award one winner. They acknowledge several different recipients, have runners-up, and have third place. Since this is a specific recognition and is different from losing an award, runner-up mentions are considered wins in this award tally. For simplification and to avoid errors, each award in this list has been presumed to have had a prior nomination.)
- Wins: 7
- Nominations: 31

Disturbed is an American heavy metal band that was formed when guitarist Dan Donegan, drummer Mike Wengren and bassist Steve "Fuzz" Kmak hired vocalist David Draiman in 1996.

Over the course of its career, Disturbed has earned three Grammy nominations, one Billboard Music Award nomination and five iHeartRadio Music Awards nominations. Overall, Disturbed has received 7 awards from 30 nominations.

== Billboard Music Award ==
Year	Nominee / work	Award	Result
2006	Disturbed	Rock Artist of the Year	Nominated

== Berlin Music Video Awards ==
Year	Nominee / work	Award	Result
2023	Bad Man	Best Director	Nominated

== Grammy Awards ==
The Grammy Awards are awarded annually by the National Academy of Recording Arts and Sciences. Disturbed received its first nomination in 2009, but did not win. The band received a second nomination in 2017, but again did not win. The band's third nomination came in 2024.

Year	Nominee / work	Award	Result
2009	"Inside the Fire"	Best Hard Rock Performance	Nominated
2017	"The Sound of Silence" (Live)	Best Rock Performance	Nominated
2024	"Bad Man"	Best Metal Performance	Nominated

== iHeartRadio Music Awards ==
Year	Nominee / work	Award	Result
2016	Disturbed	Rock Artist of the Year	Nominated
2017	Disturbed	Rock Artist of the Year	Won
2017	"The Sound of Silence"	Rock Song of the Year	Nominated
2017	"The Sound of Silence"	Best Cover Song	Nominated
2024	Disturbed	Rock Artist of the Year	Nominated

== Metal Hammer Golden Gods Awards ==
The Metal Hammer Golden Gods Awards are awarded annually by the British music magazine Metal Hammer. Disturbed's guitarist Dan Donegan has been nominated once.

Year	Nominee / work	Award	Result
2008	Dan Donegan	Best Shredder	Nominated

== Revolver Golden Gods Awards ==
The Revolver Golden Gods Awards are awarded annually by the American music magazine Revolver. Disturbed's guitarist Dan Donegan has been nominated once.

Year	Nominee / work	Award	Result
2011	Dan Donegan	Best Guitarist	Nominated

== Loudwire Music Awards ==
The Loudwire Music Awards have been awarded annually by the American online magazine Loudwire since 2011.

Year	Nominee / work	Award	Result
2015	Disturbed	Classic Cage Match Hall of Fame	Won
2015	Disturbed	Best Rock Band	Nominated
2015	Disturbed	Most Devoted Fans	Nominated
2015	Immortalized	Best Rock Album	Nominated
2015	"The Vengeful One"	Video Countdown Hall of Fame	Won
2015	"The Vengeful One"	Best Rock Song	Nominated
2015	"The Vengeful One"	Best Rock Video	Nominated
2015	Dan Donegan	Best Guitarist	Nominated
2015	David Draiman	Best Vocalist	Nominated
2015	David Draiman	Rock Titan	Nominated
2015	John Moyer	Best Bassis	Nominated
2015	Mike Wengren	Best Drummer	Nominated
2016	"Down with the Sickness"	Best Metal Song of the 21st Century	Won
2017	"The Sound of Silence"	Best Rock Video	Won
2017	"The Sound of Silence"	Best Rock Song	Nominated

== Spike Guys' Choice Awards ==
Year	Nominee / work	Award	Result
2007	Disturbed	Ballsiest Band	Won

== SiriusXM Octane Music Awards ==
Year	Nominee / work	Award	Result
2015	Disturbed	Artist of the Year	Nominated
2015	Disturbed	Most Devoted Fans	Nominated
2015	Immortalized	Album of the Year	Nominated

== Octane’s Year-End Awards ==
Year	Nominee / work	Award	Result
2016	Disturbed	Artist of the Year	Won
