= I Will Not Break (song) =

2025 single by Disturbed

Single by Disturbed
- Released: February 21, 2025
- Recorded: 2024
- Genre: Nu metal
- Length: 4:52
- Label: Mother Culture
- Songwriter: Drew Fulk
- Producer: WZRD BLD

Disturbed singles chronology
"Glass Shatters (New Mix)" (2025)	"I Will Not Break" (2025)

"I Will Not Break" is a song by American heavy metal band Disturbed. It was released as a single on February 21, 2025, through the band's independent label, Mother Culture Records. It reached No. 1 on the Billboard Mainstream Rock Airplay chart in April 2025.

== Background and release ==
Disturbed first teased "I Will Not Break" on Instagram on February 19, 2025, sharing a few studio clips and a short preview. The song premiered online the following day, February 20, 2025, as the band was preparing for a tour celebrating the 25th anniversary of The Sickness. It was officially released on February 21, 2025. The single marked the first time the band released music on their own label, Mother Culture Records, and their first new music since Divisive. Consequence described the release as the beginning of a "new era" for the band. It served as the first preview of the band's upcoming ninth album, and more songs were expected before the full album release. The band described the song as "a necessary song, about becoming stronger than the forces that constantly try to tear you down".

== Composition and lyrics ==
The lyrics are personal to singer David Draiman, addressing his struggles with depression and suicidal thoughts, as well as friends he has lost. Draiman stated the song was inspired by difficulties he experienced during the band's last tour, including his 2023 divorce, learning to raise his son as a single parent, and his reaction to the aftermath of the October 7 attacks and the rise in antisemitism.

Revolver described the song as a nu-metal anthem about pushing back and getting stronger, featuring Donegan's downtuned riffs, Wengren's pounding drums, and Draiman's aggressive vocal delivery. The song was written and recorded in Los Angeles in fall 2024 by Donegan, Wengren, and producer Drew Fulk. Donegan came up with the main riff on the spot and kept tweaking it until the band agreed on its final form. He revisited old demos and cassette tapes from the 1990s to return to the band's early creative mindset. The riff is new, but was written with the feel of early Disturbed in mind. The band completed the music first, with Draiman later adding lyrics and vocals. They intended the song as a lead-off track.

Draiman described it as a vengeance, comeback, and healing track. He also called it a power song about getting through hard times and not allowing adversity to break him. The song was one of the last they worked on, with the band providing a riff with an old-school, head-bobbing rhythm he could sing over.

Writing for MetalSucks, Hesher Keenan wrote that the song follows Disturbed's familiar sound, with downtuned riffs, radio-friendly rhythms, and Draiman's trademark vocal delivery.

== Critical reception ==
Loudwire placed the song on their "51 Best Rock + Metal Songs of 2025" list, noting its driving, gritty guitar riff, Draiman's animalistic screeches and rhythmic vocals, and its defiant, uplifting message. Wall of Sound wrote that the song recalls the band's early sound, with an ominous intro, dialled-down riffs and a gruff, melodic verse reminiscent of their early records. The review also described the song as catchy and said it doubles down on an early-2000s style. Rich Hobson of Metal Hammer and Louder Sound stated the song features pulsing thumps and Draiman's "Ah-Ah" vocalisations, feeling like something from the band's debut, but delivered with the confidence and sleekness gained over 25 years.

== Track listing ==
I Will Not Break - by Disturbed Single
No.	Title	Length
1.	"I Will Not Break"	4:52

== Chart performance ==
It reached No. 1 on the Billboard Mainstream Rock Airplay chart on April 12, 2025, their thirteenth song to do so. The band moved into a three-way tie for the sixth-most No. 1 singles on the chart. According to Mediabase, it was the second-most played song on rock radio in 2025.

== In other media ==
It was featured on the soundtrack for the video game NHL 26, released by EA Sports on September 12, 2025.

The song was used in the video package on the January 9, 2026 episode of WWE SmackDown for the WWE Championship Three Stages of Hell match between Cody Rhodes and Drew McIntyre.

== Personnel ==
Credits adapted from Apple Music.

Disturbed

- David Draiman – lead vocals, background vocals
- Dan Donegan – guitar, background vocals
- Mike Wengren – drums, background vocals

Additional credits

- Drew Fulk – producer, songwriter, mixing engineer, mastering engineer

== Charts ==
=== Weekly charts ===
Weekly chart performance for "I Will Not Break"
Chart (2025)	Peak position
Canada Mainstream Rock (Billboard Canada)	6
Italy Rock Airplay (FIMI)	15
New Zealand Hot Singles (Recorded Music NZ)	25
UK Singles Sales (OCC)	51
US Digital Song Sales (Billboard)	23
US Hot Rock & Alternative Songs (Billboard)	24
US Rock & Alternative Airplay (Billboard)	2
US Mainstream Rock Airplay (Billboard)	1

=== Year-end charts ===
Year-end chart performance for "I Will Not Break"
Chart (2025)	Position
Canada Mainstream Rock (Billboard)	21
US Rock & Alternative Airplay (Billboard)	13
US Mainstream Rock Airplay (Billboard)	4
