= Hey You (Disturbed song) =

2022 single by Disturbed

Single by Disturbed

from the album Divisive
- Released: July 14, 2022
- Length: 4:28
- Label: Reprise; Warner
- Songwriters: David Draiman; Dan Donegan; John Moyer; Mike Wengren
- Producer: WZRD BLD

Disturbed singles chronology
"Hold On to Memories" (2020)	"Hey You" (2022)	"Unstoppable" (2022)

Music video
- "Hey You" on YouTube

"Hey You" is a song by American heavy metal band Disturbed. It is the first single and opening track from their eighth album, Divisive. It reached number one on the Billboard Mainstream Rock Airplay chart in September 2022.

== Background and release ==
On July 7, 2022, Disturbed announced the release of a new single titled "Hey You" which was scheduled for release online on July 14, 2022. In the days leading up to its release, the band promoted the single by sharing a preview of its music video on July 11, 2022. It was followed by a 30-second audio teaser released via social media on July 12, 2022.

The band confirmed that the song would be the first single from their upcoming album, which was expected to be released later in 2022.

== Composition and lyrics ==
The song has been described by Consequence as recalling the band's early work, particularly the band's first album The Sickness. The track features singer David Draiman's staccato vocal delivery over heavy guitar riffs by Dan Donegan. It features a melodic chorus but remains heavy overall. Wall of Sound characterized the track as a return to the band's heavier, riff-driven sound, comparing it to "Indestructible".

According to Draiman, the song was written in response to what he described as growing division in society since the release of Evolution. He called the track a "wake-up call", saying it deals with outrage addiction, the breakdown of respectful conversation, and societal division.

Donegan said the song was meant as a wake-up call to encourage reflection on increasing hostility due to social media and politics. He pointed to how people are no longer really having respectful conversations, how attacks have increased, and how those with different views are often just "canceled".

== Reception ==
Loudwire reported that fan reactions to the song were mixed, with some listeners expressing praise and others offering criticism, including negative responses to its lyrics. A Kerrang! review said that after listening to the first three tracks, including "Hey You", the reviewer was hoping they were just off tracks and that the album's heavier, more high-energy material would show up later. Sputnikmusic staff Trey said the song's verses and grooves are solid, but the big area-rock chorus kills the momentum and isn't as good as the choruses on the other singles, disrupting the track's flow.

According to Consequence and as of November 18, 2022, "Hey You" had amassed more than 25 million streams.

== Music video ==
The single was released alongside a cinematic, science-fiction-themed music video, which premiered on the same day. The video was directed by Josiahx and filmed in Los Angeles on June 14, 2022, featuring all four members of the band performing. The video depicts a futuristic, Matrix-like setting in which people are shown consuming a constant stream of media.

== Track listing ==
Hey You - by Disturbed Single
No.	Title	Length
1.	"Hey You" (Explicit)	4:28

== Chart performance ==
It reached No. 1 on the Billboard Mainstream Rock Airplay chart on September 3, 2022, their eleventh song to do so.

== Personnel ==
Credits adapted from Apple Music.

Disturbed

- David Draiman - lead vocals, background vocals, songwriter
- Dan Donegan - guitar, background vocals, piano, synthesiser, songwriter
- John Moyer - bass guitar, songwriter
- Mike Wengren - drums, percussion, background vocals, songwriter

Additional credits

- WZRD BLD - producer, mixing engineer, recording engineer

== Charts ==
=== Weekly charts ===
Weekly chart performance for "Hey You"
Chart (2022–2023)	Peak position
Canada Rock (Billboard)	32
Czech Republic Modern Rock (ČNS IFPI)	2
Finland (Suomen virallinen lista)	97
New Zealand Hot Singles (Recorded Music NZ)	33
US Digital Song Sales (Billboard)	40
US Rock & Alternative Airplay (Billboard)	6
US Hot Rock & Alternative Songs (Billboard)	28
US Mainstream Rock Airplay (Billboard)	1

=== Year-end charts ===
Year-end chart performance for "Hey You"
Chart (2022)	Position
US Rock & Alternative Airplay (Billboard)	28
US Mainstream Rock Airplay (Billboard)	10
