= Voices (Disturbed song) =

Single by Disturbed

from the album The Sickness
- Released: November 21, 2000
- Recorded: November–December 1999
- Genre: Nu metal
- Length: 3:11
- Label: Giant
- Songwriters: Steve Kmak; Dan Donegan; Mike Wengren; David Draiman
- Producer: Johnny K

Disturbed singles chronology
"Down with the Sickness" (2000)	"Voices" (2000)	"The Game" (2001)

Music video
- "Voices" on YouTube

"Voices" is a song by American heavy metal band Disturbed. It was released in November 2000, as the third single from their debut album, The Sickness. The song charted at number 16 on the Mainstream Rock Tracks and number 18 on the Modern Rock Tracks. It is also available for sale on the Rock Band music store.

== Music video ==
The music video of the song depicts a businessman who listens to his Walkman constantly. Throughout the video, he imagines various scenarios involving hostile behavior. As David Draiman speaks the song's bridge to the man, he leaves his office and goes to a concert where Disturbed is performing the song.

Also, throughout the video, the band is performing at the concert, as well as the band members performing in different parts of the man's office. The office scenes give nods to The Matrix, hence the Matrix code screensaver on the businessman's computer and the overall look of the office room itself.

The song "Stupify" can be heard as the man walks to the elevator early in the video.

== Live performances ==
Since its inception into Disturbed's concert setlist, the song has remained something of a staple of their live performances throughout the years, despite lead singer David Draiman's deepened voice. It has been performed at several major music events and festivals, such as Rock am Ring and Music as a Weapon II. It is usually played as the first song in a concert in preparation of the rest of the songs at a concert.

In line with the song's apparent lyrical theme of insanity, when played as the opening song in concerts, Draiman has been seen as being "wheeled" onto the stage in a strait jacket and muzzle in a manner similar to Hannibal Lecter, before breaking free of his restraints and immediately performing his vocals for the song. Draiman has also done this for the song "Perfect Insanity", a song off of their fourth album Indestructible which also deals with the theme of insanity.

== Track listing ==
=== CD 1 ===
1. "Voices" – 3:11
2. "Stupify" (live) – 5:26
3. "The Game" (live) – 3:53

=== CD 2 ===
1. "Voices" – 3:11
2. "Down with the Sickness" (live) – 6:19
3. "Voices" (music video) – 3:27

=== 7" red vinyl ===
1. "Voices" – 3:11
2. "Voices" (live)

=== European promo ===
1. "Voices" (restrained edit) – 3:11
2. "Voices" (album version) – 3:11

== Chart positions ==
Year	Chart	Position
2000	United Kingdom (The Official Charts Company)	52
2000	US Mainstream Rock Tracks	16
2000	US Modern Rock Tracks	18

== Certifications ==
Region	Certification	Certified units/sales
United States (RIAA)	Gold	500,000^{‡}
^{‡} Sales+streaming figures based on certification alone.

== Personnel ==
- David Draiman – vocals
- Dan Donegan – guitar, electronics
- Steve Kmak – bass
- Mike Wengren – drums, percussion, programming

== In culture ==
The song was featured in one of the trailers for the 2001 horror film Jeepers Creepers.
