= The Game (Disturbed song) =

Single by Disturbed

from the album The Sickness
- Released: February 20, 2001
- Recorded: 1999
- Genre: Nu metal
- Length: 3:47
- Label: Giant
- Songwriters: Steve Kmak; Dan Donegan; Mike Wengren; David Draiman
- Producer: Johnny K

Disturbed singles chronology
"Voices" (2000)	"The Game" (2001)	"Prayer" (2002)

"The Game" is a song by American heavy metal band Disturbed. It was released on February 20, 2001, as the fourth and final single from the band's debut album The Sickness, and has remained a live staple since.

== Personnel ==
- David Draiman – vocals
- Dan Donegan – guitar, electronics
- Steve Kmak – bass guitar
- Mike Wengren – drums, percussion, programming
- Johnny K – producer, engineer
- Andy Wallace – mixer
- Howie Weinberg – mastering

== Chart positions ==
Chart (2002)	Peak position
US Mainstream Rock (Billboard)	34

== Certifications ==
Region	Certification	Certified units/sales
Australia (ARIA)	Gold	35,000^{‡}
Canada (Music Canada)	Gold	40,000^{‡}
United States (RIAA)	Gold	500,000^{‡}
^{‡} Sales+streaming figures based on certification alone.
