= Disturbed =

American heavy metal band

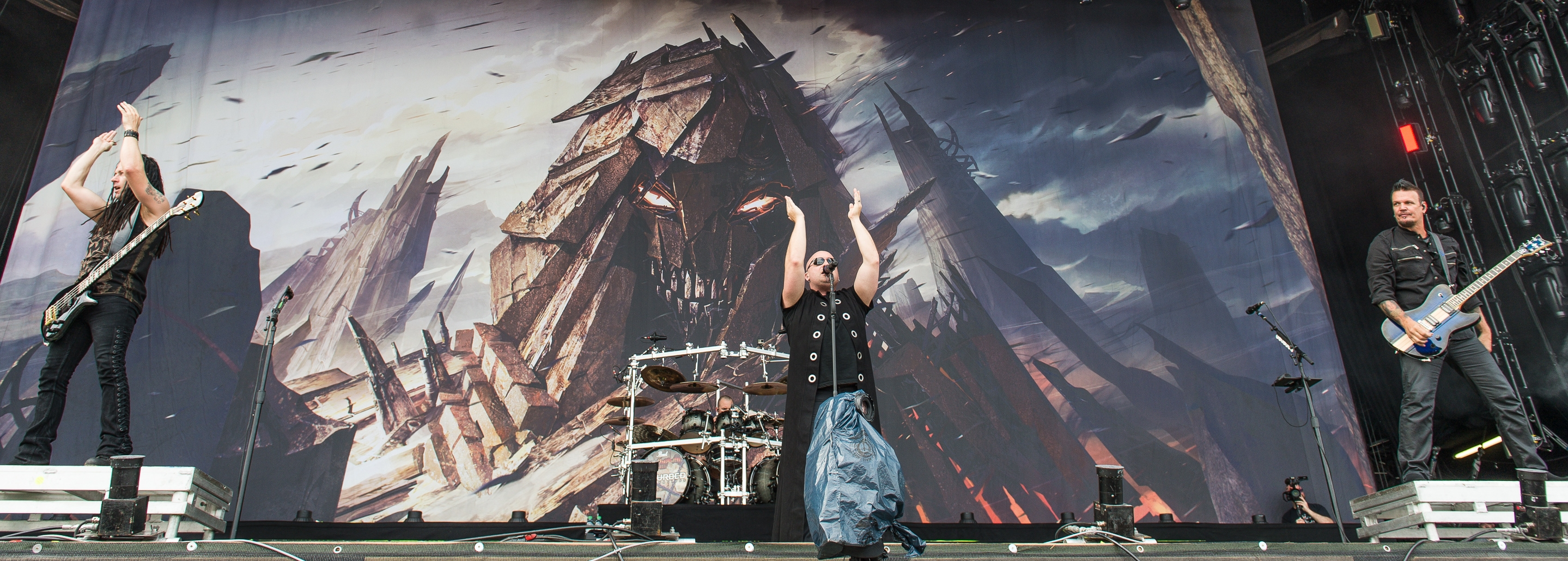
- Disturbed performing at Rock im Park in 2016

Background information
- Also known as: Brawl (1994–1996)
- Origin: Chicago, Illinois, U.S.
- Genres: Heavy metal; hard rock; alternative metal; nu metal
- Years active: 1994–2011; 2015–present
- Labels: Giant; Reprise; Warner; Intoxication; Mother Culture
- Awards: Full list
- Members: Dan Donegan; Mike Wengren; David Draiman; John Moyer
- Past members: Erich Awalt; Steve Kmak
- Website: disturbed1.com

Disturbed is an American heavy metal band from Chicago, Illinois and formed in 1994. The band includes guitarist Dan Donegan, drummer Mike Wengren, lead vocalist David Draiman, and bassist John Moyer. Donegan and Wengren have been involved in the band since its inception, with Draiman replacing original lead vocalist Erich Awalt in 1996 and Moyer replacing original bassist Steve "Fuzz" Kmak in 2004.

Disturbed's debut album, The Sickness, was released in 2000 as a commercial success, mainly due to the singles "Down With the Sickness" and "Stupify". The band then released the albums Believe (2002), Ten Thousand Fists (2005), Indestructible (2008), and Asylum (2010), all of which debuted at No. 1 on the Billboard 200 chart. Disturbed went into hiatus in October 2011, during which the band's members focused on various side projects, and released The Lost Children, a compilation album containing previously unreleased songs. They returned in June 2015 and released their sixth album Immortalized that same year. They followed it up with the albums Evolution (2018) and Divisive (2022).

The band has over 17 million records sold worldwide, six RIAA certifications for their albums (including 5× platinum for The Sickness), singles from all eight albums reaching the top ten of the Mainstream Rock chart, and two Grammy Award nominations.

== History ==
=== Early years (1994–1996) ===
Before David Draiman joined Disturbed, guitarist Dan Donegan, drummer Mike Wengren, and bassist Steve "Fuzz" Kmak were in a band called Brawl with vocalist Erich Awalt. Before changing their name to "Brawl", however, Donegan mentioned in the band's DVD, Decade of Disturbed, that the name was originally going to be "Crawl"; they switched it to "Brawl", because the name was already being used by another band. Awalt left the band shortly after the recording of a demo tape; the other three members advertised for a singer. They posted an advertisement in the local music publication in Chicago, Illinois, called the "Illinois Entertainer". Draiman answered the advertisement after going to twenty other auditions that month. Guitarist Dan Donegan commented on Draiman: "You know, out of all the singers that we had talked to or auditioned, he [Draiman] was the only singer who was ready to go with originals. And that impressed me, just to attempt that".

With regard to Draiman being the singer for the band, Donegan said, "After a minute or two, he just starts banging out these melodies that were huge...I'm playing my guitar and I'm grinning from ear to ear, trying not to give it away that I like this guy, you know, because I don't want to, you know...[say] 'Yeah, we'll give you a call back. We'll, you know, discuss it.' But I was so psyched. Chill up my spine. I'm like, 'There is something here.'" As drummer Mike Wengren commented, "We clicked right off the bat." Draiman then joined the band in 1996, and the band was renamed Disturbed. When asked in an interview why he suggested to name the band "Disturbed", Draiman said, "It had been a name I have been contemplating for a band for years. It just seems to symbolize everything we were feeling at the time. The level of conformity that people are forced into was disturbing to us and we were just trying to push the envelope and the name just sorta made sense."

=== The Sickness (1997–2000) ===
After renaming the band, Disturbed went on to record two three-track demo tapes, the first containing demos for "The Game", "Down with the Sickness", and "Meaning of Life", while the second had demos for "Want", "Stupify", and "Droppin' Plates". The artwork was composed of the band's newly created mascot, The Guy. The band eventually signed with Giant Records in August 1999 and opened for Ministry at Chicago's Riviera Theatre around the same time. In 2000, the band released its debut album, titled The Sickness, which launched the band into stardom. The album peaked at number 20 on the Billboard 200, and it has sold over four million copies in the United States since its release. Before joining Marilyn Manson's 2001 European tour, bassist Steve Kmak was unable to play with the band due to a shattered ankle, caused by falling out of a fire escape outside Disturbed's rehearsal hall in Chicago. He took the fire escape to exit the building while the elevator was being used to move their equipment downstairs. Kmak skipped the European trek of the tour, but he did perform with the band on January 11 and 12, 2001 at Disturbed's show in Chicago. During the European tour, Marty O'Brien replaced Kmak until he was able to tour again.

=== Believe (2001–2003) ===
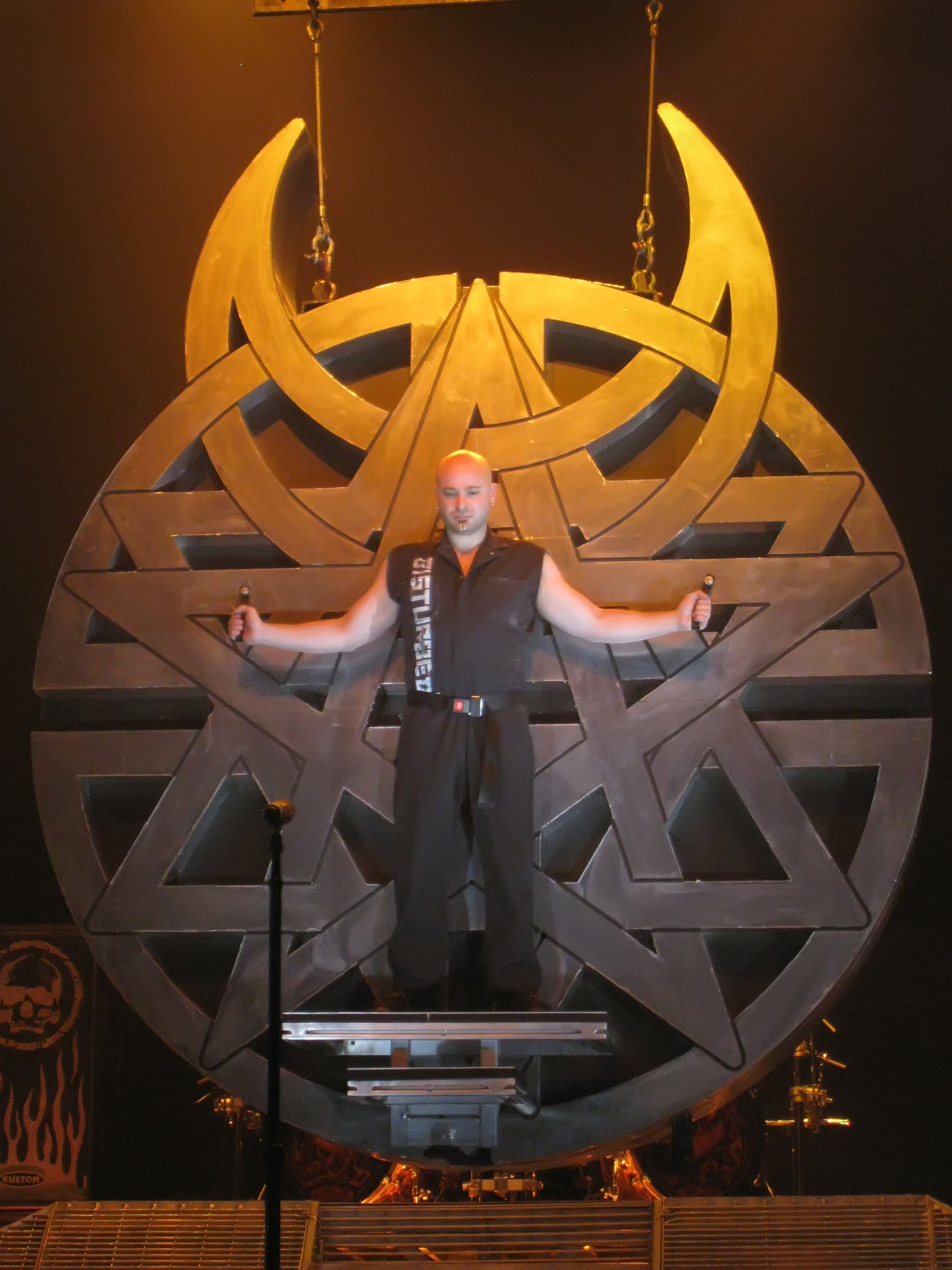
David Draiman on stage in front of the Believe logo

In 2001, Disturbed covered the song "Midlife Crisis" for a Faith No More tribute album that was eventually abandoned. The cover was later rerecorded and released on the compilation album The Lost Children in 2011. In September 2001, production of their second studio album began. On June 4, 2002, Disturbed released a documentary DVD about the band, titled M.O.L., which showed some of the band's more personal moments in the studio and during tours, as well as featuring several music videos and live performances. On September 17, 2002, Disturbed released their second studio album, titled Believe, which debuted at number one on the Billboard 200. The music video for the first single from the album, titled "Prayer", was pulled from most television stations, due to perceived similarities with the September 11, 2001 attacks. David Draiman recorded vocals for a song titled "Forsaken", a song written and produced by Jonathan Davis of the band Korn, released on Queen of the Damned.

In 2003, the band once again participated in the Ozzfest tour and started another one of their own tours, titled Music as a Weapon II. The bands Chevelle, Taproot, and Ünloco toured with them. During the tour, Disturbed debuted an unreleased song, titled "Dehumanized". After Disturbed finished the Music as a Weapon II tour, Steve Kmak was fired by the band because of "personality differences". He was replaced by John Moyer; Moyer's last band, the Union Underground, had recently become inactive. On the night Moyer became the band's new bass player, Disturbed played live at the House of Blues and performed two new songs, "Hell" and "Monster", both of which are B-side tracks on the band's third studio album, Ten Thousand Fists.

=== Ten Thousand Fists (2004–2006) ===
Disturbed's third studio album, Ten Thousand Fists, was released on September 20, 2005. The album debuted at number one on the Billboard 200, while also selling around 238,000 copies in the week following its release. The album was certified platinum, shipping 1,000,000 units, in the United States on January 5, 2006. The band toured with 10 Years and Ill Niño in support of the album. Disturbed headlined Ozzfest 2006 along with System of a Down, Lacuna Coil, DragonForce, Avenged Sevenfold, and Hatebreed.

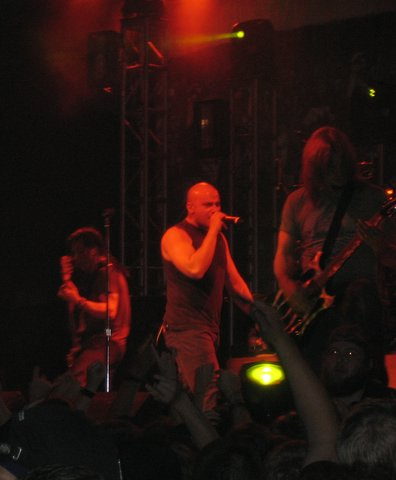
Disturbed performing in 2005

In an interview with Launch Radio Networks, Disturbed vocalist David Draiman stated that twenty songs were recorded for the album, but only fourteen made it to the final track listing. The remaining songs included "Hell", which was included in one of the two "Stricken" singles; "Monster", which was included as an iTunes pre-order bonus for Ten Thousand Fists, then later included on the Ten Thousand Fists Tour Edition; "Two Worlds", which was also included on the Tour Edition of Ten Thousand Fists; and "Sickened", which was included in the "Land of Confusion" single. Ten Thousand Fists is the first album released by Disturbed to feature guitar solos. The band stated that they felt that guitar solos are a part of music that is absent in a lot of modern music, and they wanted to bring some of that back. Songs like "Stricken", "Overburdened", and "Land of Confusion" all feature guitar solos, as well as many others.

In 2006, a European tour was scheduled but was rescheduled twice due to Draiman having troubles with severe acid reflux, which affected his voice, as related by Draiman himself. Later that year, Draiman underwent surgery for a deviated septum which affected his voice. It was successful, and ever since then, Draiman has limited his drinking on the road. In late 2006, Disturbed headlined another one of their own tours named Music as a Weapon III; the bands Flyleaf, Stone Sour, and Nonpoint toured with them. Disturbed completed the first leg of their Music as a Weapon III tour in late 2006. Soon after, Draiman stated that there was not going to be a second leg to the tour and that instead the band was going off the road to start working on their fourth studio album.

=== Indestructible (2007–2009) ===
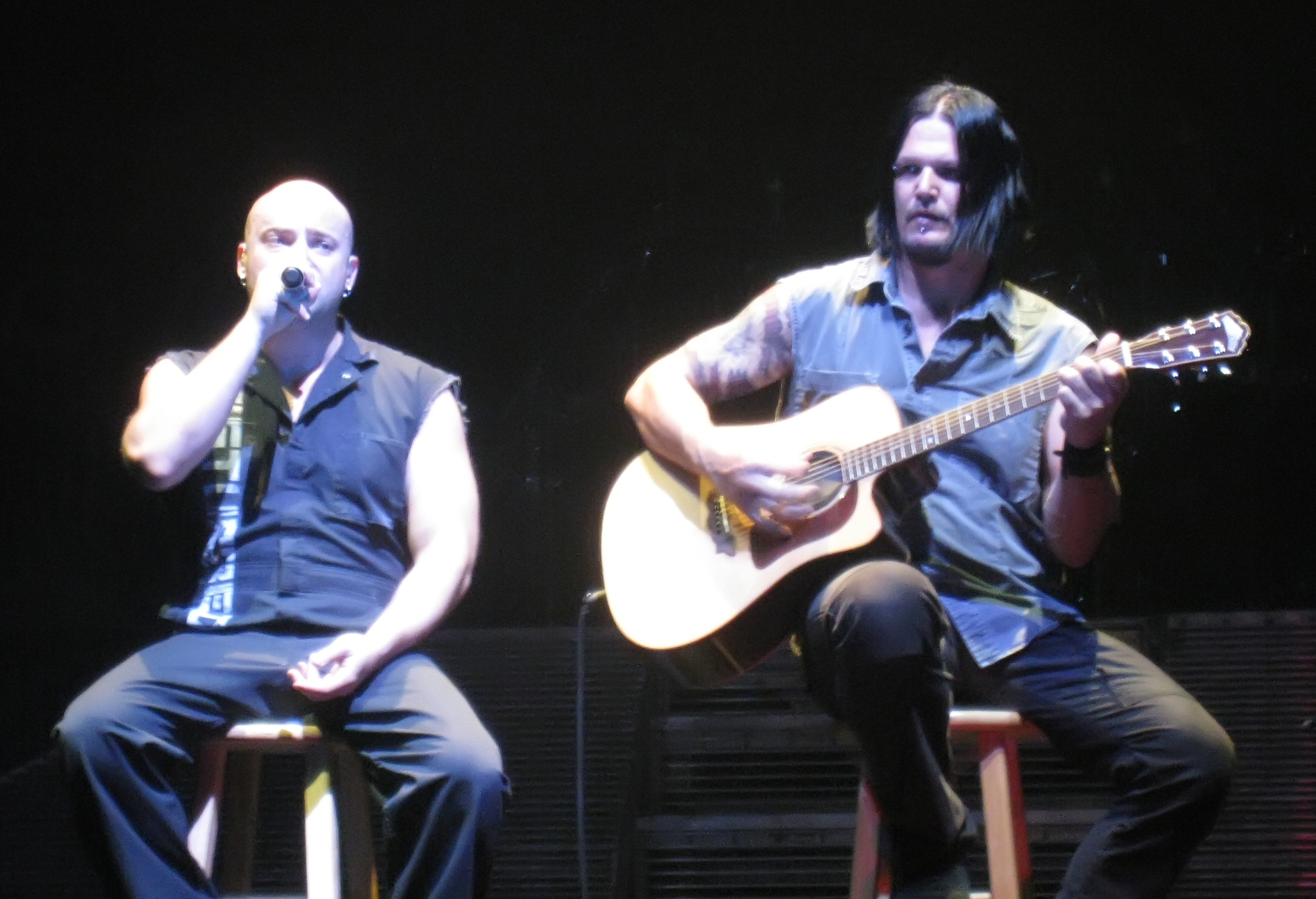
David Draiman (left) and Dan Donegan performing in 2009

In July 2007, a new track titled "This Moment" was released on the soundtrack to the film Transformers. Disturbed mixed their fourth studio album, titled Indestructible, in Los Angeles in late 2007. In an earlier interview, David Draiman said that they were going to record fifteen songs, but only twelve would be on the album.

Indestructible's first single, "Inside the Fire" was made available on digital distribution services for purchase on March 25, 2008. The band also toured in the United States in April and May 2008 with the bands Five Finger Death Punch and Art of Dying. The music video for "Inside the Fire" was released on May 2, 2008, on the band's official website. Disturbed released their previously free song "Perfect Insanity" on iTunes Store as a second single on May 6, 2008, and the album Indestructible become available for pre-order for the release date on June 3, 2008. Indestructible was released in the United States on June 3, 2008, and in Australia on June 7, 2008, and became the band's third consecutive number one debut on the Billboard 200. A special "Internet Only" limited edition of the album that includes the B-side track "Run", a making-of DVD with instructional videos, wrap-around poster, VIP laminate, access to special Disturbed events, and a special website with an exclusive video, rare audio and more was also released. Disturbed played their first live online concert on May 29, 2008. The concert was sponsored by Pepsi and Deep Rock Drive. They performed in Las Vegas. The band toured in support of the "Mayhem Festival" alongside Slipknot, DragonForce and Mastodon during summer of 2008. Disturbed also completed a tour of Australia and New Zealand through August and September 2008.

In May 2008, Harmonix, the developers of the video game Rock Band announced they had reached a deal with Disturbed and Best Buy to offer two tracks from Indestructible for play in Rock Band to those who pre-ordered the album from Best Buy's website. On June 3, 2008, Harmonix released three tracks from Indestructible; "Indestructible", "Inside the Fire", and "Perfect Insanity". On May 12, 2009, Harmonix released Stricken and Stupify to the Rock Band music store.

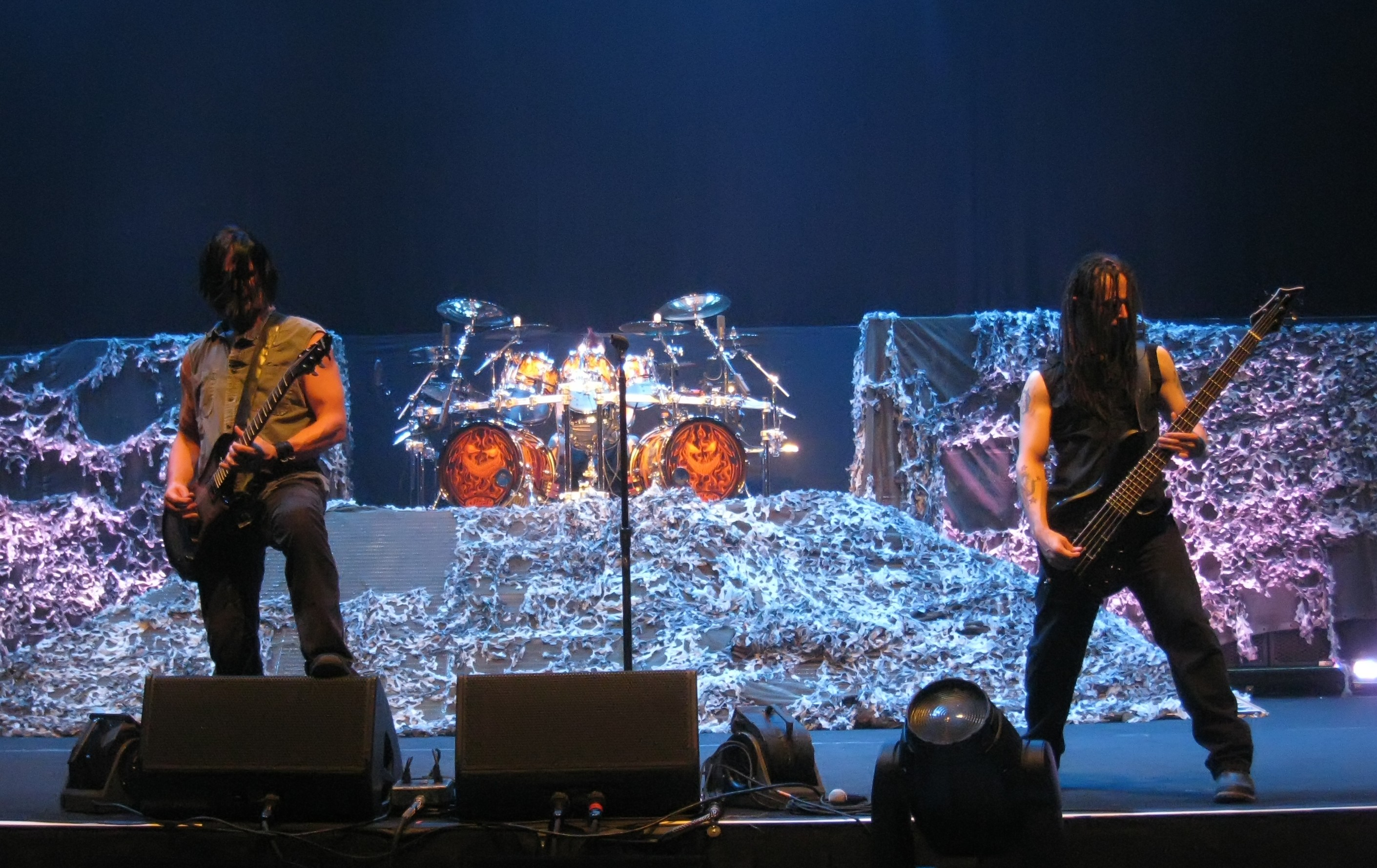
Dan Donegan (left) and John Moyer in 2009

On September 30, 2008, the band released an iTunes-exclusive live album entitled Live & Indestructible, made up of songs from Deep Rock Drive, as well as the music video for "Indestructible". The band started a tour of Europe, starting in London during October 2008 and finishing during November 2008 in Helsinki. In November and December 2008, Disturbed toured in the United States. The song "Inside the Fire" was nominated for a 2009 Grammy Award in the "Best Hard Rock Performance" category. In March 2009, Disturbed released a music video for the single "The Night". The band began their Music as a Weapon IV tour in March 2009 and it ended in late May. The tour, also dubbed a "festival", featured the bands Killswitch Engage, Lacuna Coil, and Chimaira on the main stage. The band released a second cover version of Faith No More's song "Midlife Crisis" on the album Covered, A Revolution in Sound, which also included bands such as Mastodon, The Used, and Avenged Sevenfold. This cover of "Midlife Crisis" was originally recorded for Indestructible, but the band decided not to include it on the album.

=== Asylum, The Lost Children and hiatus (2009–2011) ===
In an interview in July 2009, with FaceCulture, Draiman stated that the DVD would be "chronicling the past decade of Disturbed's existence. It's meant to show our growth over the course of the decade." He also talked more about the fifth album: "A couple of [song riffs] that Danny has come up with are really amazing. But they're just little pieces...it's not even in two-three part progression [yet]." A few months later on March 23, 2010, the band released a reissue of their debut album, The Sickness, with the B-side tracks "God of the Mind" and "A Welcome Burden", updated artwork, as well as remastering and remixing the track list. It was also available for the first time in vinyl format. On February 26, 2010, Harmonix announced a second Disturbed pack for download on the Rock Band music store, containing the 2010 remastered versions of "Voices", "The Game", and "Meaning of Life".

The band entered the studio in Chicago in early 2010 to begin recording their fifth album, planning on a release that summer. Guitarist Dan Donegan stated that the band had written around 15–18 songs. It was later confirmed that the title of the album would be Asylum. The band released a cover of heavy metal band Judas Priest's song "Living After Midnight" for the Metal Hammer Presents... Tribute to British Steel album. On April 20, 2010, roughly two months after they entered the studio, Disturbed announced that they had finished recording the album, and were ready to begin mixing it in Los Angeles, California. As they did with their last album Indestructible, Disturbed stated that they self-produced Asylum. The band announced that Asylum would be released on August 31, 2010. On July 9, 2010, the track listing was revealed on the band's official website. Asylum debuted at number one on the Billboard 200. Asylum was Disturbed's fourth consecutive studio album to debut on top of the charts, an achievement only earned by two other bands: Metallica and Dave Matthews Band.

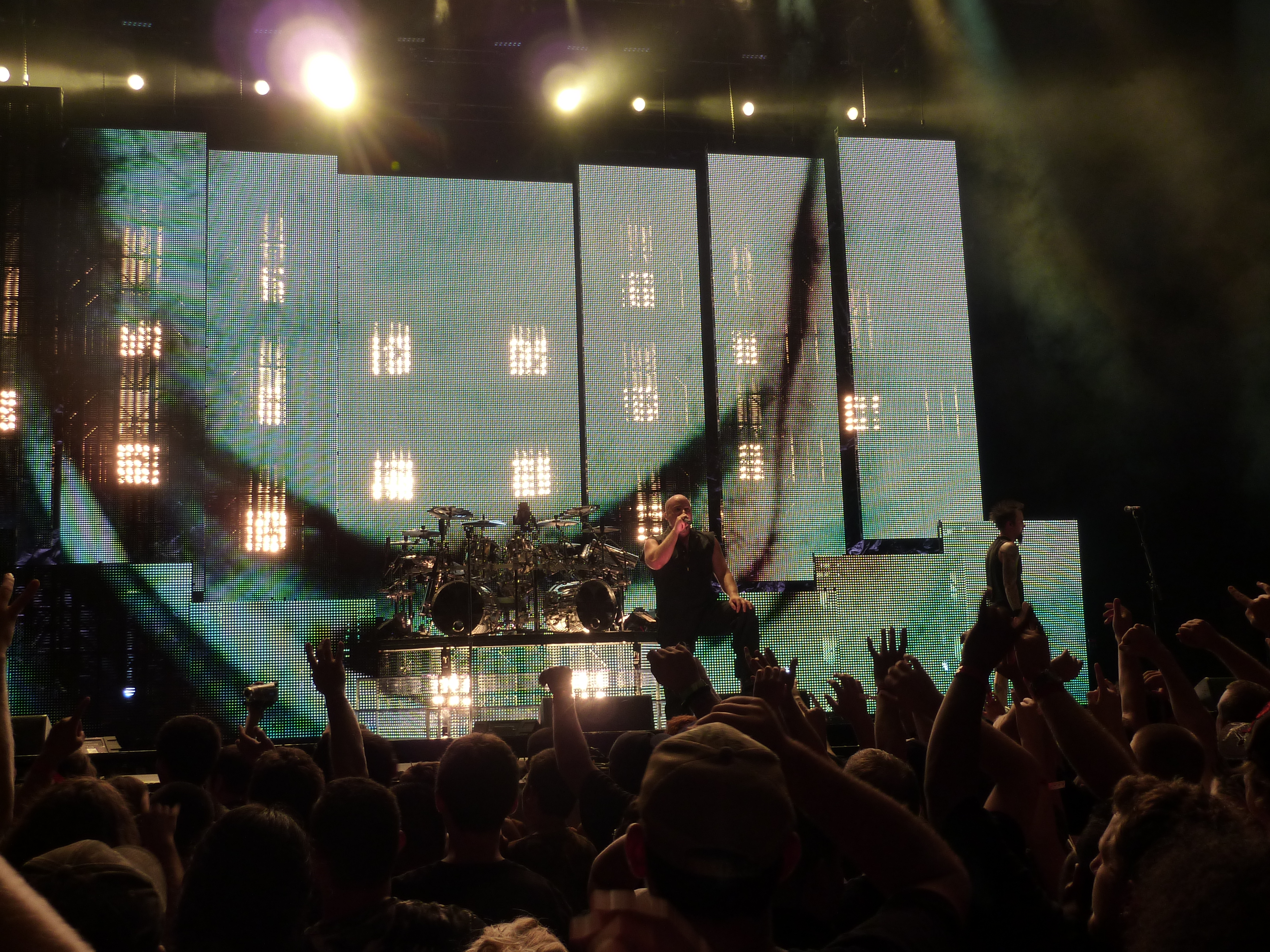
Disturbed performing "Down with the Sickness" in 2010

Disturbed headlined the first annual "Rockstar Energy Drink Uproar" tour with Avenged Sevenfold, as well as Stone Sour, Hellyeah and Halestorm, among others in late summer 2010. Then, in October 2010, it was reported that David Draiman was diagnosed with a "serious throat condition", and the band's U.S. tour had been canceled, as Draiman's healing process could have taken up to four weeks. Around the end of that year, Disturbed announced that they would be commencing the Music as a Weapon V tour in 2011, co-headlining with Korn and guests Sevendust, In This Moment and Stillwell. In January 2011, the Mayhem Festival announced that Disturbed would be headlining the festival along with Godsmack and Megadeth that summer. In February 2011, Disturbed was added to that summer's Download Festival. Disturbed announced that in May 2011, they would be co-headlining the Rock on the Range Festival in Columbus, Ohio.

On Thursday, April 28, Disturbed announced that their previously unreleased bonus track from Asylum, titled "3", would be available for download on their website. They said that all proceeds made from the download of the song would go towards the Damien Echols Defense Fund, a benefit foundation supporting the release of the West Memphis Three.

In July 2011, the band confirmed it would go on hiatus after finishing their US tour that year, and in an interview that same month, Draiman dismissed concerns that the hiatus was a result of conflict between the band members. Disturbed went into hiatus in October 2011. Disturbed released a b-side compilation album, titled The Lost Children, on November 8, 2011. The song "Hell" was made available for digital download on October 11, 2011, but Draiman stated on his Twitter page that there would not be a music video for it. A previously unreleased track, titled "Mine", also appears on the album. The track listing and release date were revealed on Draiman's Twitter page on September 20. On April 21, 2012, to commemorate Record Store Day, Disturbed released "The Collection". It is a box set featuring the band's five full-length studio albums in 140 gram vinyl LPs.

In 2013, the band was featured in an NME article titled "28 Nu-Metal Era Bands You Probably Forgot All About".

=== End of hiatus and Immortalized (2015–2017) ===
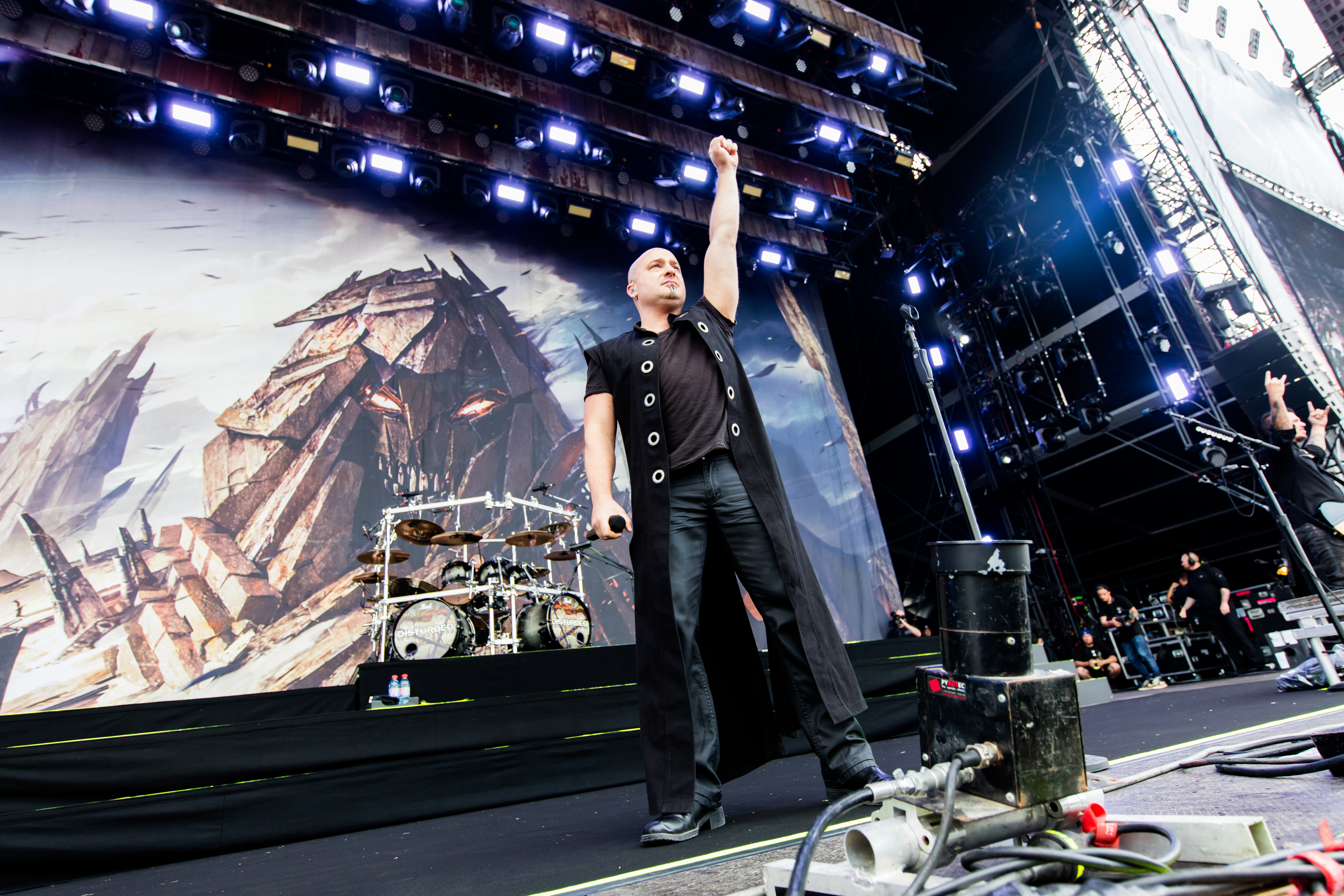
The band at Rock am Ring, Germany, 2016

On June 20, 2015, on Disturbed's Facebook page and website, there was material posted hinting at a possible return of the band. The website shows a new Disturbed logo, plus a video of the band's mascot "The Guy" appearing to be on life support, still breathing. The new Disturbed logo was also posted to their official Facebook page, along with the video of their mascot, and their profile picture changed to solid black, indicating new activity within the band. On June 22, 2015, Disturbed posted another video on Facebook, this time showing The Guy awakening from life support, as well as an 18-hour countdown on their official website, giving speculation to a definite reunion.

On June 23, 2015, Disturbed officially announced the end of their hiatus and the coming of their new album entitled Immortalized. On the same day, the official music video for the new single "The Vengeful One" was released on their YouTube channel. Immortalized was released on August 21, 2015. John Moyer did not perform on the album due to working on other projects, with all bass tracks being performed by Dan Donegan. Moyer is not in the band's video for "The Sound of Silence" released in December 2015. Moyer remains a band member, however, having appeared in promotional photography for the album as well as continuing to perform live with the band.

On the album's release day, the band played their first show in four years at the House of Blues in Chicago. The show featured the live debuts of four new songs ("The Vengeful One", "What Are You Waiting For", "The Light" and the title track) and the song "Hell", a B-side from Ten Thousand Fists, in its entirety for the first time.

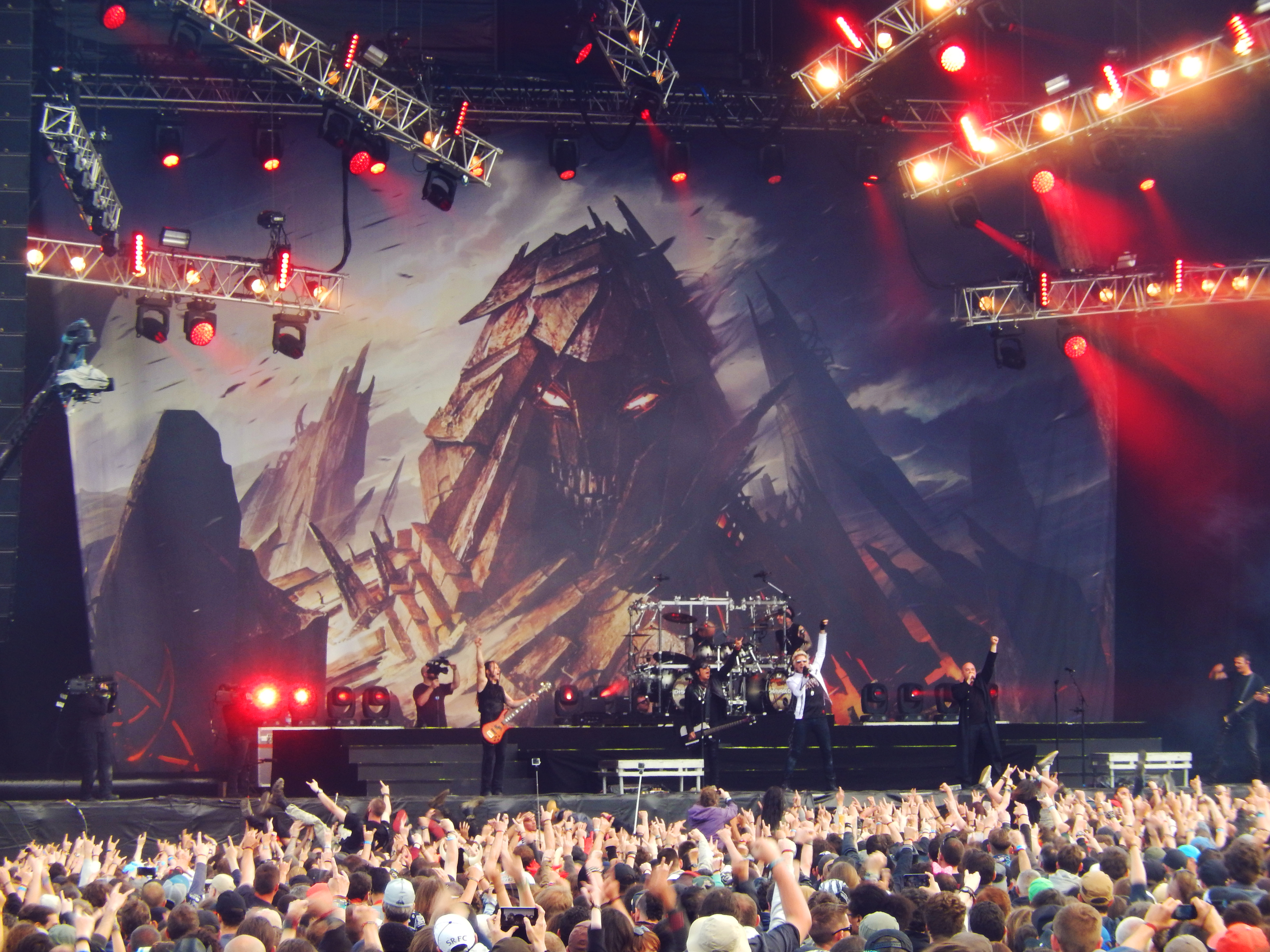
Disturbed during Hellfest 2016

Disturbed released a virtual reality experience for the band's cover of "The Sound of Silence" via Littlstar. The band released a live album titled Live at Red Rocks on November 18, 2016. The band performed "The Sound of Silence" live on an episode of Australia's The X Factor. The band also performed "The Sound of Silence" live on an episode of Conan. Disturbed was announced as a direct support to Avenged Sevenfold on their UK & European tour throughout January and March 2017, alongside In Flames and Chevelle.

=== Evolution (2018–2020) ===
Disturbed headlined the 2018 Rock Fest, along with Godsmack and Incubus. The band announced via social media in early January 2018 that they had entered the studio to begin recording their next studio album. In June 2018, lead guitarist Dan Donegan and bassist John Moyer confirmed with sources that the new album had been completed, with 100% of the songs finished, leaving only mixing and mastering to be done. Band members also posted a picture via Instagram together at a dinner party in celebration of completion of the recording process, the band's first album in over 3 years and the band's first album in over 8 years to have bassist John Moyer being involved in.

The album, Evolution was released on October 19, 2018. On August 16, 2018, the lead single, titled "Are You Ready" was released. On September 21, 2018, the album's second single, titled "A Reason to Fight" was released. In support of the album, the band announced the 'Evolution World Tour', which took place in early 2019. The initial dates announced included shows across North America with select Canadian dates, as well as a European leg of the tour. On March 25, 2019, Disturbed announced a massive summer tour with Pop Evil and In This Moment. Pop Evil opened the first half of dates and In This Moment opened the second.

On January 27, 2020, the band announced a 31-date tour with Staind and Bad Wolves celebrating the 20th anniversary of The Sickness. Due to the COVID-19 pandemic, the band had postponed the tour to 2021. On September 11, 2020, Disturbed released a cover of the song "If I Ever Lose My Faith in You" by Sting. On March 12, 2021, it was announced that the 20th anniversary tour was officially canceled.

=== Divisive (2021–2024) ===
Following a break, the band played its first pandemic-era live shows. The first one was the first time in nearly two years on September 25, 2021, as one of the headliners of the Louder Than Life festival in Louisville, Kentucky. The band also played later in November at the Welcome to Rockville festival at the Daytona International Speedway in Daytona Beach, Florida.

Draiman talked about the progress of the songwriting sessions for the band's follow-up to 2018's Evolution: "It's on in a big, big, big fucking way. It really, really is. I mean, we are so genuinely excited." He also said that the new material is going back to their "meat and potatoes", and that it is close to the vibe of The Sickness and Ten Thousand Fists albums. Draiman said that the band wants to begin recording after the New Year of 2022, but they have yet to announce a producer. The new songs will also be released on two separate mediums, as opposed to Disturbed's usual album releases.

On July 14, 2022, Disturbed released a new single called "Hey You" from their upcoming album.

On September 23, 2022, the band announced their eighth album, entitled Divisive, with a promotional single "Unstoppable" being released. The album was released on November 18, 2022. The album is a concerted effort to move back toward the heavier sound of their early albums after experimenting on the prior album. The new album also became the first to include a guest vocalist, with Ann Wilson of hard rock band Heart lending vocals to the dark, heavy ballad "Don't Tell Me".

On December 3, 2022, Divisive debuted on the Billboard charts at no. 3 on the Album Sales Chart, no. 3 on the Rock Album Chart, no. 1 on the Alternative Albums Chart, and no. 13 on the Billboard 200 after spending a week at no. 1 on the Apple All-format Album Chart. Singles "Bad Man", "Unstoppable", and "Hey You" all appeared on the Mainstream Airplay Chart and album cuts "Hey You" (no. 2), "Unstoppable" (no. 1), "Don't Tell Me" (no. 2), and "Bad Man" (no. 10) all appeared in the Top 10 of the Hard Rock Songs Digital Sales Chart. In 2024, "Bad Man" was nominated for the Best Metal Performance Grammy. The band embarked on a tour in 2024 entitled the "Take Back your Life" tour.

=== The Sickness 25th Anniversary tour, and upcoming new album (2025–present) ===
In October 2024, Disturbed announced an upcoming 2025 American tour celebrating the 25th anniversary of The Sickness. The 34 date tour will run throughout the winter and spring of 2025 and feature support from Three Days Grace and Sevendust on the first leg and Daughtry and Nothing More on the second leg.

Disturbed released a new single, "I Will Not Break", in February 2025. Draiman also stated that there is plenty of new music on the way from the band, leading up to the release of a new record. The first show of the United States leg of the tour was on February 25.

The band was rejoined by their original bassist Steve "Fuzz" Kmak during their live show in Chicago, Illinois during The Sickness 25th Anniversary Tour on March 8, marking his first appearance with the band since 2003. Also during this live performance, the band's pyrotechnic display caused "minor damage" to the Chicago Bulls' championship banners, forcing the banners to be temporarily removed.

The band finished their European leg of the tour in late October 2025, with support from Megadeth. A few days later, the band revealed they will take a break from performing live in 2026; they only performed two shows in July 2026.

== Other projects ==
On February 8, 2012, it was announced that John Moyer was supergroup Adrenaline Mob's new bass player. John made his onstage debut with the group on March 12, at New York City's Hiro Ballroom, a day before the release of the band's debut full-length album, Omertá. On February 14, 2012, on his Twitter account David Draiman confirmed that he would make an appearance on VH1's That Metal Show 10th Season airing sometime that year. That episode was later moved to the 11th season and premiered on August 11, 2012.

In May 2012, Draiman announced his new project, an industrial metal band called Device. Draiman later released information regarding the future of Disturbed and his new project Device, stating that Device would release their self-titled debut album on April 9, 2013. The album features several guest musicians from various metal bands. On April 25, 2013, it was announced that guitarist Dan Donegan and drummer Mike Wengren had begun a new project with Evans Blue singer Dan Chandler, Fight or Flight. Their debut album, "Life by Design?" was released on July 23, 2013.

In December 2014, Moyer formed a new band with Scott Weiland, Ron "Bumblefoot" Thal, twins Jon and Vince Votta called Art of Anarchy, with a self-titled album released in June 2015. After the death of Weiland, the band recruited retired Creed singer Scott Stapp and recorded their second album The Madness, released in March 2017. In February 2018, Art of Anarchy members filed a lawsuit to the New York Supreme Court against Stapp for alleged failure to promote The Madness.

== Artistry ==
=== Musical style and influences ===
Disturbed is mostly classified as heavy metal, hard rock and alternative metal, while their early sound has been described as nu metal. A hallmark of the band's sound is groove. Writers at Loudwire stated that "the band proved that a simple groove is sometimes all that you need." The band also incorporates "anthemic choruses" into their sound, which Metal Injection attributes the band's sustained commercial viability to. The band's early material featured many syncopated rhythms.

Guitarist Dan Donegan uses guitar tunings drop C, drop C#, and drop B (also occasionally E♭ standard), which are lower tunings than regular E standard. These lower tunings allow for a heavier sound and quicker chord changes in Donegan's riffs. Donegan also uses subtle electronic effects, which the rest of the band refers to as "The Danny Donegan Orchestra".

In 2006, when asked about die-hard heavy metal fans not finding Disturbed heavy enough, Draiman stated:

"We probably have too much melody going on or we're not quite as turbulent or caustic. While I really love that type of music, it's not what we try to do. If we have to place things in context, we're more hard rock than heavy metal these days.

The secret is that we were never really part of any particular trend, although we definitely benefited from the popularity of what was called nu metal at the time ... We never had the stereotypical attributes that those bands had. We don't rap; there's no turntable involved; no fusion in that respect. We play, in my opinion, classic metal. Sabbath, Maiden, Priest, Metallica, Pantera: these are the bands that made us want to play."

Metal Hammer stated that the band "were seen as part of nu metal’s second major ejaculation, even if they kicked against the tag." David Draiman said he never understood the classification of Disturbed as nu metal. He said: "We never rap, we’ve never had a turntable. All of the elements that are parts of being a nu-metal band were never part of what we did. [...] But we came up at the same time as those guys were enjoying a tremendous amount of success so we got slapped with that label. If we had come up during the time [Iron] Maiden and [Judas] Priest were dominating things in the mid-‘80s, I don’t think there would be any question how we would be identified."

They have often cited their influences as Black Sabbath, Judas Priest, Metallica, Pantera, Iron Maiden, Queensrÿche, and Soundgarden. Draiman's main influences came from funk-infused bands such as Faith No More, and he expresses much admiration for Faith No More singer Mike Patton. AllMusic reviewer Bradley Torreano described the album Believe as "taking the sort of jump that their heroes in Soundgarden and Pantera made after their respective breakthrough records". He also described the title track as moving "from a brutal chug to a sweeping chorus that suddenly stops in its tracks and turns into a winding riff that recalls the work of vintage James Hetfield". Believe is also considered by several critics to be a step away from the nu metal sound featured on The Sickness, moving towards a more hard rock and heavy metal sound that was continued in their following albums.

=== Lyrical themes ===
According to frontman David Draiman on the band home documentary M.O.L., the lyrics that he writes are inspired by actual experiences of his own, and he stated that he likes to present his ideas with cryptic lyrics. These lyrical themes range from the concept of Heaven and Hell, domestic abuse, suicide, insanity, relationships and war, to more fantastical themes, such as vampirism, werewolves and demons. Many of the band's post-hiatus releases have featured political lyrics.

=== Imagery ===
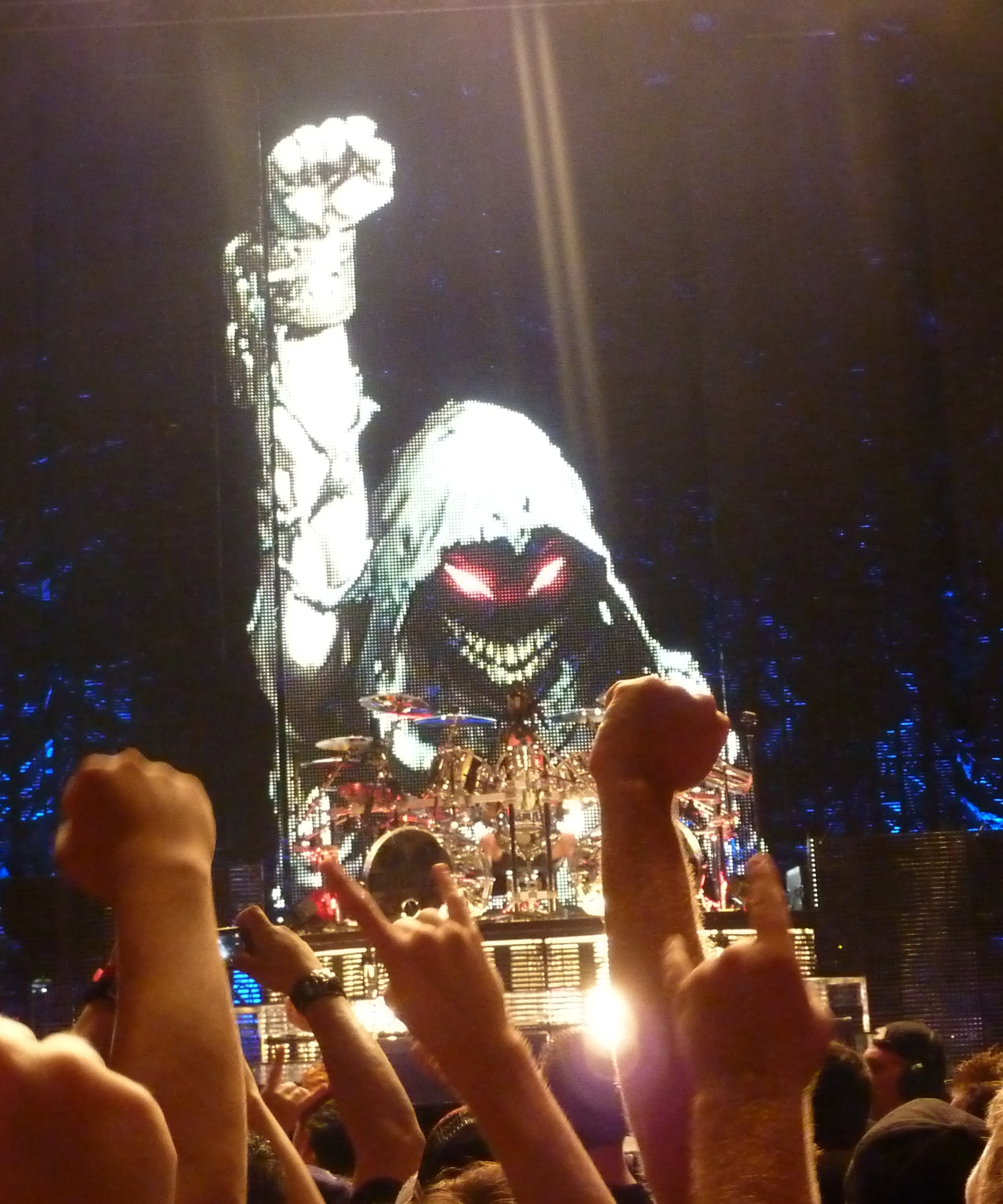
The Guy

Disturbed's mascot, named "The Guy", was originally a drawing of a face with a large grin, as seen on the back of the album The Sickness. The original drawing of The Guy was then edited using a digital distorting program. After the original image had been distorted three times, The Guy became the band's official mascot. Later, he would be drawn as a full figure by artist David Finch.

== Band members ==
Current members
- Dan Donegan – guitar (1994–2011, 2015–present); keyboards, programming (1999–2011, 2015–present); bass (2015); backing vocals (2015–present)
- Mike Wengren – drums (1994–2011, 2015–present); programming (1999); backing vocals (2015–present)
- David Draiman – lead vocals (1996–2011, 2015–present)
- John Moyer – bass, backing vocals (2004–2011, 2015–present)

Former members

- Erich Awalt – lead vocals (1994–1996)
- Steve "Fuzz" Kmak – bass (1994–2003, guest appearance in 2025)

=== Gallery ===
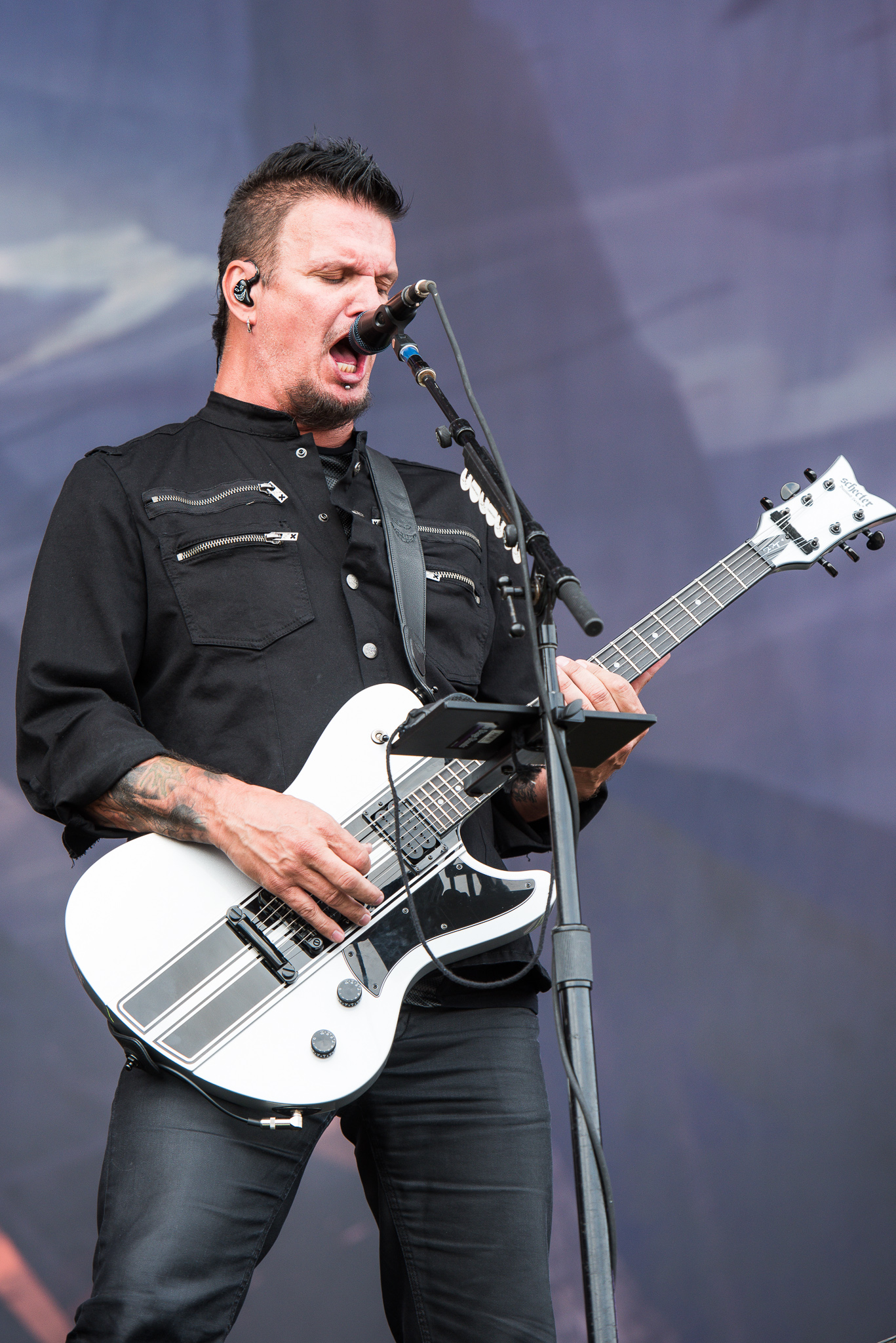
Dan Donegan

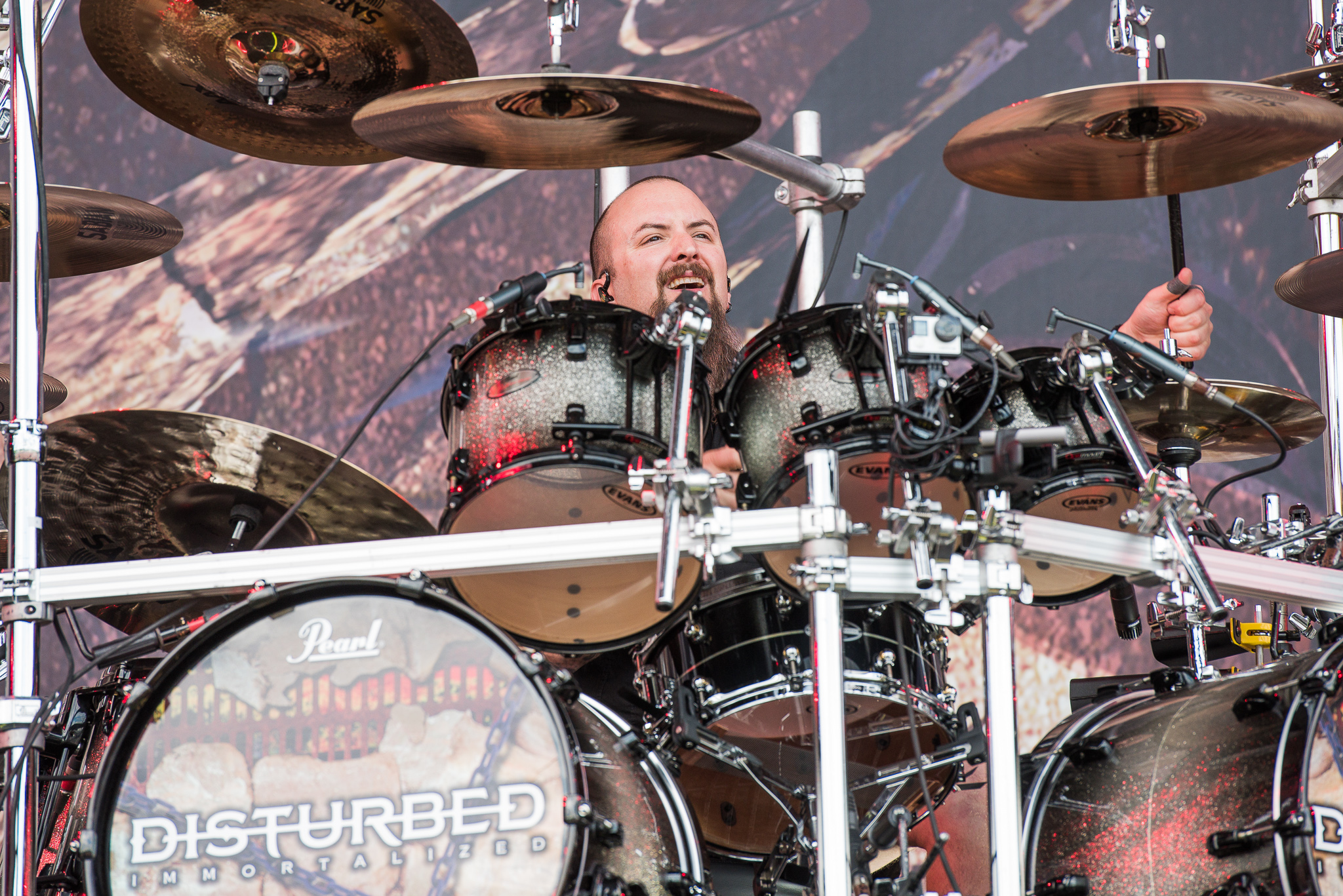
Mike Wengren

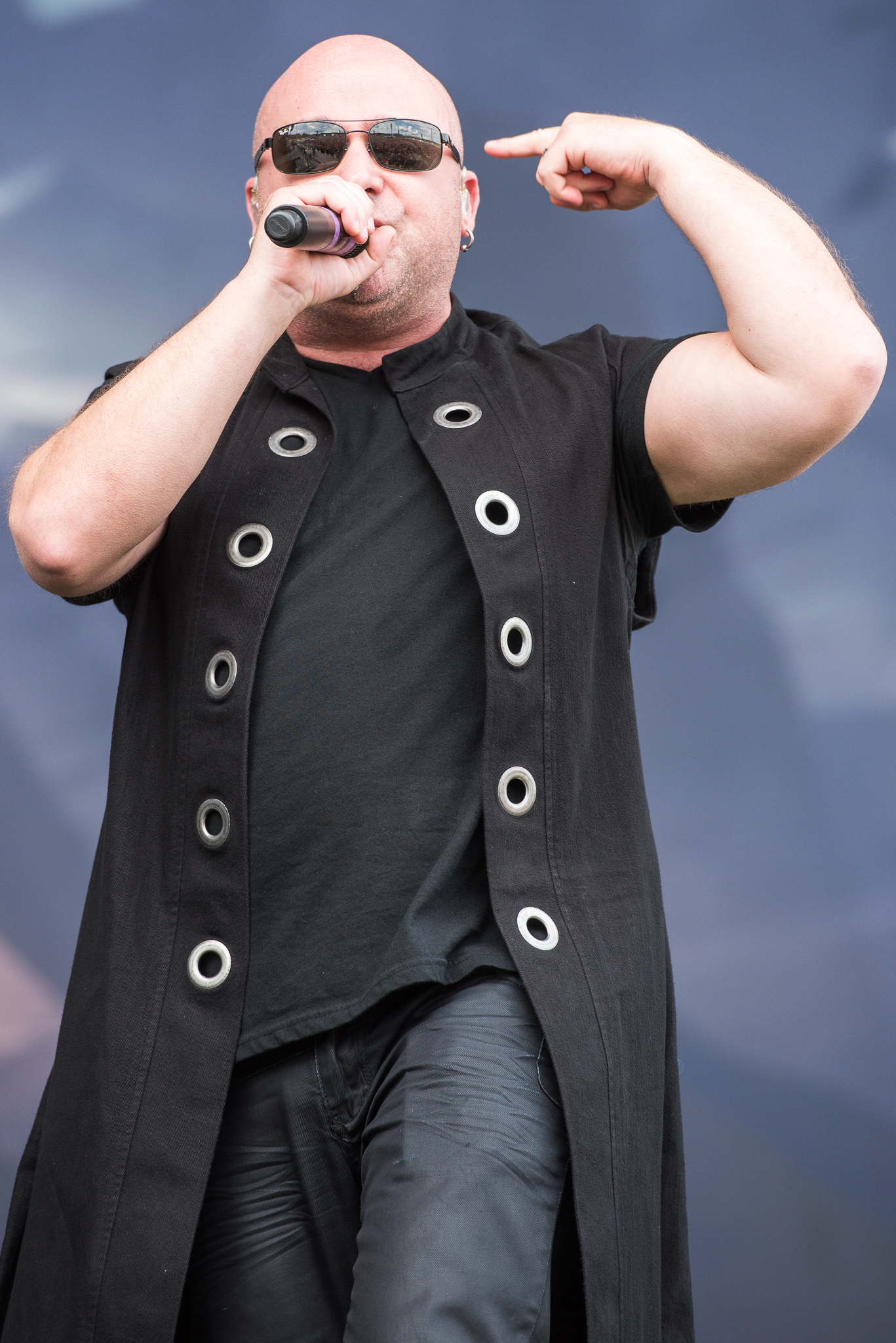
David Draiman

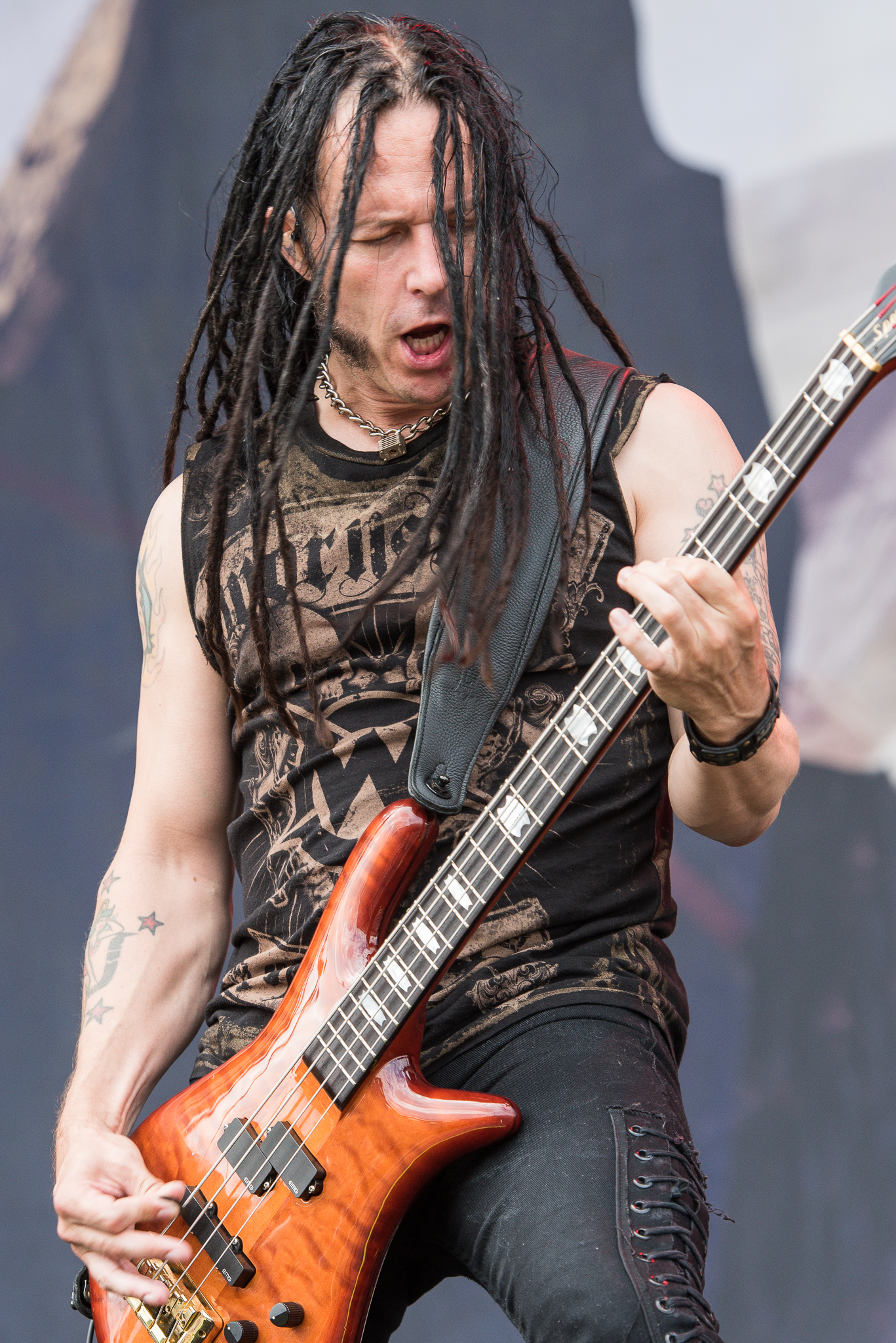
John Moyer

== Discography ==
Studio albums

- The Sickness (2000)
- Believe (2002)
- Ten Thousand Fists (2005)
- Indestructible (2008)
- Asylum (2010)
- Immortalized (2015)
- Evolution (2018)
- Divisive (2022)

== Tours ==
Headlining

- The Sickness Tour (2000–2001)
- Believe Tour (2002–2003)
- Ten Thousand Fists Tour (2005–2006)
- Indestructible Tour (2008–2009)
- Asylum Tour (2010–2011)
- Immortalized Tour (2016)
- Evolution Tour (2019)
- Take Back Your Life Tour (2023–2024)
- The Sickness 25th Anniversary Tour (2025–2027)
