= Divisive (album) =

Studio album by Disturbed
- Released: November 18, 2022
- Recorded: 2022
- Studios: East Iris Studios (Berry Hill, Tennessee); 25th Street Recording Studios (Oakland, California); FMG Recording Studios (Orland Park, Illinois)
- Genres: Heavy metal; alternative metal; hard rock
- Length: 37:55
- Label: Reprise
- Producer: Drew Fulk

Disturbed chronology
Evolution (2018)	Divisive (2022)

Singles from Divisive
- 1. "Hey You" Released: July 14, 2022; 2. "Unstoppable" Released: September 23, 2022; 3. "Bad Man" Released: November 18, 2022; 4. "Don't Tell Me" Released: November 7, 2023

Divisive is the eighth studio album by American heavy metal band Disturbed. Produced by Drew Fulk, it was released on November 18, 2022, via Reprise Records.

The first single from the album was "Hey You", which was released on July 14, 2022. In regards to the sound of the single, it is said to be similar to the band's earlier albums such as The Sickness and Ten Thousand Fists. A promotional single called "Unstoppable" was released on September 23, 2022, along with the details for their upcoming album. With a run time of 37 minutes and 55 seconds, It is the shortest Disturbed album to date. It is the final Disturbed album to be released through Reprise Records.

== Background and recording ==
As early as October 2020, frontman David Draiman stated that he wanted new Disturbed music to be "blisteringly angry", considering everything going on in the world with the COVID-19 pandemic.

Back in April 2022, Draiman took to his Instagram page to a share a photo of a whiteboard to his fans and followers suggesting that the album has been completed, in that photo, which has now been deleted, a list of approximately ten songs can be seen, all marked with an "X" symbol, which had initially led to speculation by fans that the album is a covers album.

Ann Wilson of Heart appears on the album on the song titled "Don't Tell Me". According to Dan Donegan, Ann is David's favorite female hard rock singer. After Ann sent out a tweet saying she was "inspired" by the band's cover of "The Sound of Silence", David reached out to Ann to thank her and they developed an online friendship. After the demo of "Don't Tell Me" had been recorded the band felt like it needed a female voice, and they thought Ann would be perfect. David reached out to her to ask if she would appear on the record, and the band was delighted when she said yes. In many interviews band members have stated they are "humbled" to have such rock royalty appear on the album.

"Hey You" topped the Mainstream Rock Airplay chart. A song titled "Bad Man" began radio play on Octane by November 15, and the song's meaning was inspired by the Russian invasion of Ukraine.

At 37 minutes and 55 seconds, Divisive is the shortest studio album to be released by the band. It also features their shortest full song, "Won't Back Down".

== Reception ==
Professional ratings
Aggregate scores
Source	Rating
Metacritic	59/100
Review scores
Source	Rating
AllMusic	3/5 stars
Blabbermouth.net	8.5/10
Classic Rock	4/5 stars
Kerrang!	2/5 stars
Melodic	3.5/5 stars
Metal Hammer	4/5 stars
Sputnikmusic	3.3/5
Wall of Sound	7/10

Divisive received mixed to positive reviews from critics. In a review published on Wall of Sound, reviewer Ricky Aarons wrote: "Overall, Disturbed's new album is a pretty good record. Is it great? That decision may be divisive." He went on to praise the heavier approach on the album.

Another review came from Kris Peters from Heavy Magazine: "Yes, Disturbed will always continue to do what they want musically, but don't ever think that means they are going soft. A welcome, if not completely triumphant, return!"

Joe Daly of Metal Hammer gave the album a rating of 4 out of 5 stars in a review published on Louder Sound. He said, "Polarising or not, Disturbed have reasserted their claim to the modern metal throne and Divisive will surely delight their existing fans, while picking up a few more along the way."

Blabbermouth.net gave the album a rating of 8.5/10.

== Track listing ==
All songs written by Disturbed, except where noted. "Don't Tell Me" appears as the first track on the Spotify release of the album.

Divisive track listing
No.	Title	Writer(s)	Length
1.	"Hey You"		4:28
2.	"Bad Man"	Disturbed; Drew Fulk	3:22
3.	"Divisive"		3:58
4.	"Unstoppable"		3:58
5.	"Love to Hate"		3:36
6.	"Feeding the Fire"	Disturbed; Fulk	4:19
7.	"Don't Tell Me" (featuring Ann Wilson)	Disturbed; Fulk	4:31
8.	"Take Back Your Life"	Disturbed; Fulk	2:58
9.	"Part of Me"		3:53
10.	"Won't Back Down"		2:52
Total length:			37:55

== Personnel ==
Disturbed

- David Draiman – lead vocals
- Dan Donegan – guitars, keyboards, backing vocals
- Mike Wengren – drums, percussion, backing vocals
- John Moyer – bass, backing vocals

Additional musicians

- Ann Wilson – vocals (on track 7)

Additional personnel

- Drew Fulk – production, mixing, engineering
- Ted Jensen – mastering
- Jeff Dunne – mixing
- Trent Woodman – mixing and engineering assistance
- Jace Mann – additional engineering (on track 7)
- Paul Murphy – additional engineering (on track 7)

== Charts ==
Weekly chart performance for Divisive
Chart (2022)	Peak position
Australian Albums (ARIA)	5
Austrian Albums (Ö3 Austria)	11
Belgian Albums (Ultratop Flanders)	57
Belgian Albums (Ultratop Wallonia)	152
Canadian Albums (Billboard)	9
Croatian International Albums (HDU)	7
Dutch Albums (Album Top 100)	78
Greek Albums (IFPI)	51
Finnish Albums (Suomen virallinen lista)	15
French Albums (SNEP)	150
German Albums (Offizielle Top 100)	9
Hungarian Albums (MAHASZ)	12
New Zealand Albums (RMNZ)	7
Polish Albums (ZPAV)	37
Scottish Albums (Official Charts)	13
Swiss Albums (Schweizer Hitparade)	11
UK Albums (Official Charts)	17
UK Album Downloads (Official Charts)	4
UK Rock & Metal Albums (Official Charts)	2
US Billboard 200	13
US Top Alternative Albums (Billboard)	1
US Digital Albums (Billboard)	1
US Top Hard Rock Albums (Billboard)	1
US Top Rock Albums (Billboard)	3

=== Singles ===
Year	Song	US Main.	US Rock	US Hard Rock Digital	CAN Rock	CZE Rock	FIN	NZ Hot
2022	"Hey You"	1	6	2	32	2	97	33
2022	"Bad Man"	2	7	10	32	—	—	38
2023	"Unstoppable"	1	7	1	29	—	67	—
2023	"Don't Tell Me"	2	—	1	—	—	—	—
