= Stupify =

2000 single by Disturbed

Single by Disturbed

from the album The Sickness
- Released: April 12, 2000
- Recorded: November–December 1999
- Genre: Nu metal
- Length: 4:34 (album version); 4:07 (single version)
- Label: Giant
- Songwriters: Steve Kmak; Dan Donegan; Mike Wengren; David Draiman
- Producer: Johnny K

Disturbed singles chronology
"Stupify" (2000)	"Down with the Sickness" (2000)

Music video
- "Stupify" on YouTube

"Stupify" is a song by American heavy metal band Disturbed. It was released on April 12, 2000, as the first single from their debut album, The Sickness. It peaked at No. 12 on the United States Mainstream Rock Tracks chart and No. 10 on the Modern Rock Tracks chart. The song was used in an English adaptation of the Dragon Ball Z movie, Lord Slug, in the trailer for the film Swimfan, and remixed for the movie Little Nicky as "Stupify (Fu's Forbidden Little Nicky Remix)", and even Little Scarlet.

== Meaning ==
The song is against racism and discrimination. The song is about a relationship Disturbed's vocalist David Draiman had with a Latina girl. He said her family didn't approve of him because of his different ethnicity.

== Music video ==
The video for the song features the band performing the song in a rusted cellar-like room, intercut with footage of a young boy sitting in the same room. As the song progresses, the boy is revealed to be haunted by ghost-like images. David Draiman said that the boy represents his inner child and also said, "This inner child has been damaged in such a way that the world he sees around him is dark and frightening and marred by life experience. It's haunted by specters and ghosts from the past."

== Track listing ==
=== Version one ===
1. "Stupify" – 4:34
2. "Stupify" (Live) – 4:34
3. "The Game" (Live) – 3:47
4. "Stupify" (Restrained Edit) – 5:08

=== Version two ===
1. "Stupify" – 4:34
2. "The Game" (Live Restrained) – 3:47
3. "Voices" (Live Restrained) – 3:11
4. "Down with the Sickness" – 4:38

=== European version ===
1. "Stupify" (Restrained) – 4:05
2. "Stupify" (Album Version) – 4:05

=== US promo ===
1. "Stupify (The Forbidden "Fu" Mix)" – 5:08

== Chart positions ==
Year	Chart	Position
2000	US Mainstream Rock Tracks	12
2000	US Modern Rock Tracks	10
2000	US Bubbling Under Hot 100	12

== Certifications ==
Region	Certification	Certified units/sales
Australia (ARIA)	Gold	35,000^{‡}
Canada (Music Canada)	Gold	40,000^{‡}
New Zealand (RMNZ)	Gold	15,000^{‡}
United States (RIAA)	2× Platinum	2,000,000^{‡}
^{‡} Sales+streaming figures based on certification alone.

== Personnel ==
- David Draiman – lead vocals
- Dan Donegan – guitars, keyboards, backing vocals
- Steve Kmak – bass
- Mike Wengren – drums, percussion, programming
