= Down with the Sickness =

2000 single by Disturbed

Single by Disturbed

from the album The Sickness
- Released: October 31, 2000
- Recorded: 1999
- Genre: Nu metal
- Length: 4:38 (album version); 3:42 (radio edit)
- Label: Giant
- Songwriters: Steve Kmak; Dan Donegan; Mike Wengren; David Draiman
- Producer: Johnny K

Disturbed singles chronology
"Stupify" (2000)	"Down with the Sickness" (2000)	"Voices" (2000)

Audio sample
- "Down with the Sickness" (chorus): file; help

Music video
- "Down with the Sickness" on YouTube

"Down with the Sickness" is a song by American heavy metal band Disturbed. It was recorded in 1999 and released in 2000 as the second single from the band's debut studio album, The Sickness. "Down with the Sickness" is one of Disturbed's best-known songs and is a concert staple, usually played as the last song. This was Disturbed's first single to be certified platinum in the United States by the Recording Industry Association of America. The song was certified 8× Platinum by the RIAA on January 17, 2025.

In 2017, Annie Zaleski of Spin named it the sixth-best nu metal track of all time, calling lead singer David Draiman's uttering of the "ooh-wah-ah-ah-ah" staccato noise "the throat-clearing heard 'round the world." In 2013, the staff of Loudwire included the song's main riff in their list of "the 10 Best Metal Riffs of the 2000s".

== Music and composition ==
"Down With the Sickness" is a nu metal song that features an unusual "ooh-wah-ah-ah-ah" staccato noise from Draiman at the end of the intro, which reappears before the last chorus. Annie Zaleski of Spin opined that "the rest of the song basically plays second fiddle to this exhortation." Draiman has stated the sound was made possible by effects on his vocal cords after receiving surgery for acid reflux, but he has dismissed the rumor the noise was actually caused by heartburn, further explaining, "I mean the song originally was written and just had a pause. Mikey's beat is just so tribal and you know it just made me feel like an animal... [The noise] came out one day."

Guitarist Dan Donegan has mentioned that the tuning for the guitar "is drop C-sharp... your bottom five strings are half a step down and your low string will be dropped to C-sharp." This is sometimes referred to as "E♭ Drop D♭", the most common drop tuning for bands who play generally in E♭ standard instead of E standard.

== Lyrics ==
A spoken segment near the end of the song describes a child who is physically abused by his mother and who ultimately retaliates. This segment is somewhat controversial and music critics sometimes express a negative opinion of its inclusion in the song. For example, Leor Galil of the Chicago Reader opined, "Yet I still find it hard to believe that the megasingle 'Down With the Sickness,' with its vocal breakdown in which front man David Draiman crudely describes being beaten by his mom (and vice versa), guided the band on to a path that's resulted in four albums topping the Billboard 200."

However, the band has disavowed that this song is about literal child abuse, and that it is instead about a metaphoric abuse. Draiman explained to the Phoenix New Times:

...the screamed psychodramas in metal hits like "Down With The Sickness" ... are merely inspired by personal history, not a literal journal of his own tortured upbringing. "I'm really talking about the conflict between the mother culture of society, who's beating down the child yearning for independence and individuality, and the submission of the child."

The "abuse" segment is not included in the radio edit or the music video.

== Music video ==
A music video composed of live concert footage was produced for the song. The song is known for its segment which features a boy being attacked and abused by his mother, which was not featured in the music video. The music video was recorded at the "Hollywood Casino Amphitheatre" (named the Tweeter Center at the time) in Tinley Park, Illinois, during Q101's Jamboree 2001.

== In other media ==
- The song is featured in the 2001 Jet Li film The One during an action scene.
- The song was featured in the first episode of the 11th season of South Park, "With Apologies to Jesse Jackson".
- Former CZW wrestler and the late Christopher Jonathan Bauman Jr. better known by his ring name Chri$ Ca$h used the song as his entrance music from 2001–2005 in CZW until his death in an automobile accident on August 18, 2005. As of 2005, Combat Zone Wrestling annually run a memorial tribute event for Bauman titled "Down with the Sickness" after his theme song.
- A swing cover version, performed by Richard Cheese as well as the original that plays during the end credits of the 2004 version of the film Dawn of the Dead.
- The song is featured in WWE 2K18.
- In May 2019, the song was used during the final scene of the Brooklyn Nine-Nine episode "Sicko".
- Since 2022, Phoebe Bridgers has used the song as her walk-on music when performing live. In 2023, David Draiman gave his blessing of its use after he saw footage of Bridgers' entrance on TikTok.
- In February 2024, KFC used the song in a UK advertisement.
- The song is playable in the 2023 rhythm-action video game Invector: Rhythm Galaxy.
- In March 2024, it was added to Fortnite as a playable Jam Track in Fortnite Festival.
- The song is featured in the 2026 documentary The Sick Mind of EDP445, by independent director Mike Clum.

== Accolades ==
Region	Year	Publication	Accolade	Rank
United States	2015	Loudwire	10 Best Metal Riffs of the 2000s	3
United States	2016	Loudwire	Best Metal Song of the 21st Century	Won

== Personnel ==
=== Disturbed ===
- David Draiman – vocals
- Dan Donegan – guitar, electronics
- Steve Kmak – bass
- Mike Wengren – drums, percussion, programming

=== Production ===
- Johnny K – production, engineering
- Andy Wallace – mixing
- Howie Weinberg – mastering

== Charts ==
Chart (2001)	Peak position
UK Rock & Metal (OCC)	37
US Bubbling Under Hot 100 (Billboard)	4
US Alternative Airplay (Billboard)	8
US Mainstream Rock Airplay (Billboard)	5

== Certifications ==
Region	Certification	Certified units/sales
Australia (ARIA)	4× Platinum	280,000^{‡}
Canada (Music Canada)	6× Platinum	480,000^{‡}
Denmark (IFPI Danmark)	Gold	45,000^{‡}
Germany (BVMI)	Gold	300,000^{‡}
New Zealand (RMNZ)	4× Platinum	120,000^{‡}
United Kingdom (BPI)	Platinum	600,000^{‡}
United States (RIAA)	8× Platinum	8,000,000^{‡}
Ringtone / Mastertone
Canada (Music Canada) Ringtone	Gold	20,000^{*}
United States (RIAA) Mastertone	Gold	500,000^{*}
^{*} Sales figures based on certification alone.^{‡} Sales+streaming figures based on certification alone.
