= The Sickness =

2000 studio album by Disturbed

Studio album by Disturbed
- Released: March 7, 2000
- Recorded: November–December 1999
- Studios: Groovemaster Studios, Chicago, Illinois and Soundtrack Studios, New York City
- Genre: Nu metal
- Length: 47:36
- Labels: Giant; Reprise
- Producer: Johnny K

Disturbed chronology
The Sickness (2000)	Believe (2002)

Singles from The Sickness
- 1. "Stupify" Released: April 12, 2000; 2. "Down with the Sickness" Released: October 31, 2000; 3. "Voices" Released: November 21, 2000; 4. "The Game" Released: February 20, 2001

The Sickness is the debut studio album by American heavy metal band Disturbed. It was released on March 7, 2000, by Giant and Reprise Records. The album peaked at number 29 on the US Billboard 200, and spent a total of 106 weeks on the chart. It was Disturbed's only album not to hit number one on the US Billboard 200 until their seventh album Evolution debuted at number 4 in 2018. In 2018, The Sickness was certified five times platinum by the RIAA for shipments of over five million copies in the US, making it the band's most successful album.

== Background and recording ==
The Sickness was Disturbed's first studio release since the band's formation in 1994. Reflecting on the band's early days, lead vocalist David Draiman said in a 2015 interview, "People think it was like this meteoric rise. It really wasn't. We beat the hell out of ourselves for two or three years as a local band, our own self-promotional mega-machine, every band member in a different venue of the city every time a rock show would come through town, passing out our promotional material — cassettes, stickers, t-shirts, whatever we could. [This was] in addition to playing strategically where we thought it made sense and in addition to building our following on the south side of Chicago. So there was a long period of time before that and a lot of struggle in a city that wasn't conducive to hard rock and heavy metal. Chicago was an alternative town. It was Smashing Pumpkins, Local H. It was not metal. So we were blacklisted. We couldn't even play inner-city clubs. We weren't cool enough. We were too metal. That was something that wasn't considered cool enough. We had to force our way in."

However, as the late 1990s brought a shift in focus in the rock industry toward a heavier sound, the band secured a record deal with Giant Records and Disturbed got their big break. Prior to the album's recording, the band sought to refine its sound. Lead guitarist Dan Donegan took a different approach than usual and adopted a style that did not incorporate guitar solos: "In the beginning, before we were even signed, I'd solo all over the place and it didn't really work, so I pretty much cut out the solos altogether until the last album or two. That's the way it's worked with us. Over time we've pushed each other to become better musicians," Donegan said in a 2011 interview with Guitar World.

According to Draiman, it was challenging for him to become comfortable with writing about the personal themes contained throughout the album's lyrics, saying, "It's very frightening. Because here you go, you've decided to be open and bare a part of your soul to these people, and lay it out on a platter for them to observe. So until you know that the listeners are getting any part of what you're saying, it's incredibly frightening." Draiman's comments reflected the personal nature of the album's lyrical material and his approach to writing about it.

With Draiman on vocals and Donegan on guitar, the two were joined by Mike Wengren on drums and Steve "Fuzz" Kmak on bass. Seeking help with the album's production process, the band turned to producer Johnny K, who had gone to high school with Donegan's brother. By the time work on the album had started, a bond had already formed and Johnny K had begun working with the band as the producer for their album. In an interview with Guitar Edge, Johnny K spoke about the process, saying, "They fought hard to get me to do their record. They didn't want to go to L.A. and make a record that wouldn't be any better than their demos. I felt that with a budget and time, I could make a record everyone would really like [...] I pushed them as hard as I could, and we felt successful before it sold one copy. All of that hard work, and the fact that they are such a good band, made it easy for me to get other jobs. People liked it and would say, 'Who did the Disturbed album? Let's get him.'"

Recording sessions took place in late 1999, and on March 7, 2000, The Sickness was released; however, the album was not an instant success. The lead single from the album, "Stupify", was released in April 2000. "[It] was actually a hard sell at radio," Draiman said. "It's not like it shot up. They worked it. Giant Records at the time, they worked it. They pushed it to where it got enough awareness that it did start to chart decently." The track addressed themes of racism and discrimination, loosely based on one of Draiman's own experiences. It would go on to reach No. 12 on the Mainstream Rock chart and No. 10 on Modern Rock and remains one of their most popular songs. It was followed by the singles "Down with the Sickness" in October of the same year, "Voices" the following November, and "The Game" in February 2001.

== Reception ==
Professional ratings
Review scores
Source	Rating
AllMusic	3/5 stars
Alternative Press	4/5 stars
Kerrang!	4/5 stars
Metal Hammer	9/10
Rolling Stone	3/5 stars
Spin	5/10
Sputnikmusic	3.0/5

The album received positive reviews upon release. Steve Huey from AllMusic commented "But even if it has a few less-than-compelling moments, The Sickness overall comes off as the work of a band who really doesn't have far to go to achieve total control of its sound and compositional skills, and that makes it a terrific debut album."

In 2013, Loudwire featured The Sickness in their "Top 25 Debut Hard Rock Albums" list, placing the album at number 24. In 2020, it was named one of the 20 best metal albums of 2000 by Metal Hammer magazine. In 2021, the album was put on the list of the Revolver magazine "20 Essential Nu-Metal Albums". In 2025, Rae Lemeshow-Barooshian of Loudwire included the album in her list of "the top 50 nu-metal albums of all time", ranking it tenth.

== Reissues ==
=== 10th anniversary ===
On March 23, 2010, a reissue of the album was released that was remastered, slightly remixed and includes B-sides, new artwork, and exclusive online content. This reissue celebrates the tenth anniversary of the release of the album and is available for the first time in Standard Black vinyl format.

Disturbed's guitarist, Dan Donegan, commented on the reissue: "[...] it's the album that put us on the map and launched our career. So we went back into the studio and we remixed it, we're having it remastered, we're gonna put a couple of bonus tracks on there and touch up some of the packaging and the artwork. Just a little collector's item, a little tribute to that album for the fans".

The two songs included in the reissue, "God of the Mind" and "A Welcome Burden", are also included in a B-side compilation called The Lost Children.

=== 20th anniversary ===
In January 2020, Disturbed announced that they were going on tour for The Sickness 20th Anniversary Tour with Staind and Bad Wolves. The tour was canceled due to the COVID-19 pandemic. The Sickness was re-released to mark the album's 20th anniversary. It includes all of the original songs remastered and live versions of the songs. The Sickness 20th Anniversary Tour was rescheduled for July and September 2021 but was once again canceled due to the COVID-19 pandemic and restrictions.

=== 25th anniversary ===
On March 7, 2025, the 25th Anniversary Deluxe Edition of the album was released with bonus tracks including B-sides, demos, rarities, and live tracks recorded between 2000 and 2001. Among the new tracks included is a new mix of "Glass Shatters" that features a snippet of Stone Cold Steve Austin, who used the song as his entrance theme in the early 2000s, introducing Disturbed from when the band performed it during the October 1, 2000, edition of WWF Sunday Night Heat.

Disturbed marked the anniversary with a tour of North America and Europe. The concerts saw them play The Sickness in its entirety, followed by a set of the band's greatest hits. In November 2025, Draiman announced that Disturbed were on "indefinite hiatus". The announcement followed the cancellation of a concert in Brussels, Belgium after the singer voiced his support for Israel in the ongoing Gaza conflict.

== Soundtrack appearances ==
- "Voices" appeared in one of the trailers for the horror film Jeepers Creepers.
- "The Game" appeared in the English adaptation of Dragon Ball Z: Cooler's Revenge.
- "Stupify" and "Fear" appeared in an English adaptation of Dragon Ball Z: Lord Slug.
- "Down with the Sickness" appeared in several films, TV episodes, and video games, including The One, Queen of the Damned, the 2004 remake of Dawn of the Dead, The Death of Dick Long, Green Street, the Brooklyn Nine-Nine episode "Sicko", the South Park episode "With Apologies to Jesse Jackson", Rock Band 2, Guitar Hero 5, Guitar Hero Live, Fortnite Festival, WWE 2K18, and other media. The Guitar Hero 5, Rock Band 2, and Fortnite Festival versions have the "abuse" segment intact; however, all profane language was removed. Guitar Hero Live also features this song in the GH On Demand feature of the game; however, as the music video version of the song is the version that is used, the "abuse" segment is not featured. Professional wrestler Christopher Chri$ Ca$h Bauman also used "Down with the Sickness" as his theme song from 2001–2005 in CZW until his death in an automobile accident on August 18, 2005. As of 2005, Combat Zone Wrestling annually run a memorial tribute event for Bauman titled "Down with the Sickness" after his theme song. The show originally started as a double header afternoon show, with another CZW event taking place later in the evening. Many former CZW trainees have made appearances on past events, including longtime friend GQ, who has wrestled on all of the events.
- The "Forbidden 'Fu' Mix" of "Stupify" is featured in the Little Nicky soundtrack.

== Track listing ==
All tracks are written by Disturbed, except where noted.

Standard and 20th anniversary edition
No.	Title	Writer(s)	Length
1.	"Voices"		3:11
2.	"The Game"		3:47
3.	"Stupify"		4:33
4.	"Down with the Sickness"		4:38
5.	"Violence Fetish"		3:23
6.	"Fear"		3:46
7.	"Numb"		3:44
8.	"Want"		3:52
9.	"Conflict"		4:35
10.	"Shout 2000" (Tears for Fears cover)	Roland Orzabal, Ian Stanley	4:18
11.	"Droppin' Plates"		3:48
12.	"Meaning of Life"		4:01
Total length:			47:36

2002 reissue bonus tracks
No.	Title	Length
13.	"God of the Mind"	3:05
14.	"Stupify" (live)	4:53
15.	"The Game" (live)	3:53
16.	"Voices" (live)	3:36
17.	"Down with the Sickness" (live)	6:16
Total length:		69:19

10th anniversary edition bonus tracks
No.	Title	Length
13.	"God of the Mind"	3:04
14.	"A Welcome Burden"	3:32
Total length:		54:12

Instrumental disc
No.	Title	Length
1.	"Voices" (instrumental)	3:18
2.	"The Game" (instrumental)	3:53
3.	"Stupify" (instrumental)	4:13
4.	"Down with the Sickness" (instrumental)	4:45
5.	"Violence Fetish" (instrumental)	3:29
6.	"Fear" (instrumental)	3:53
7.	"Numb" (instrumental)	3:50
8.	"Want" (instrumental)	3:57
9.	"Conflict" (instrumental)	4:41
10.	"Shout 2000" (instrumental)	4:25
11.	"Droppin' Plates" (instrumental)	3:48
12.	"Meaning of Life" (instrumental)	4:00
Total length:		1:42:24

25th anniversary edition (disc 2) – Demos and Rarities
No.	Title	Writer(s)	Length
1.	"Down with the Sickness" (demo)
2.	"Droppin' Plates" (demo)
3.	"Meaning of Life" (demo)
4.	"Shout" (demo)	Orzabal, Stanley
5.	"Stupify" (demo)
6.	"The Game" (demo)
7.	"Want" (demo)
8.	"God of the Mind"		3:04
9.	"A Welcome Burden"		3:32
10.	"Stupify" (The Forbidden 'Fu' Mix)
11.	"Glass Shatters" (new mix)	Jim Johnston; Draiman; Donegan; Wengren; Kmak	4:04

25th anniversary edition (disc 3) – Live at The Palladium, Los Angeles, CA, April 18, 2001
No.	Title	Writer(s)	Length
1.	"Want"
2.	"Fear"
3.	"Droppin' Plates"
4.	"Fetish"
5.	"Stupify"
6.	"Numb"
7.	"God of the Mind"
8.	"Shout 2000"	Stanley, Orzabal
9.	"Voices"
10.	"Meaning of Life"
11.	"Conflict"
12.	"The Game"
13.	"Walk"	Dimebag Darrell, Vinnie Paul, Phil Anselmo, Rex Brown
14.	"Down with the Sickness"
15.	"Voices" (live at the Metro, Chicago, 2000)
16.	"Stupify" (live at the London Astoria, 2001)

== Personnel ==
=== Disturbed ===
- David Draiman – vocals
- Dan Donegan – guitars, keyboards, programming
- Steve Kmak – bass
- Mike Wengren – drums, percussion, programming

=== Production ===
- Disturbed – production
- Johnny K – engineering, production
- Tadpole – engineering
- Frank De Lamora – programming
- Enrique Santiago – programming
- Andy Wallace – mixing
- Steve Sisco – mixdown engineering
- Howie Weinberg – mastering
- P.R. Brown – art direction, design, cover and object photography
- Jana Leon – band photography

=== 10th anniversary edition (2010) ===
- Neal Avron – mixing
- Ted Jensen – mastering

=== International edition live tracks ===
- Tim Powell and Bif Dawes for Westwood One – engineering
- Recorded in Chicago, IL on March 10, 2000, at The Metro

== Charts ==
=== Weekly charts ===
Weekly chart performance to The Sickness
Chart (2000–2002)	Peak position
Scottish Albums (OCC)	100
UK Albums (OCC)	102
UK Rock & Metal Albums (OCC)	9
US Billboard 200	29
US Top Catalog Albums (Billboard)	1
US Heatseekers Albums (Billboard)	3

Chart (2008)	Peak position
Australian Albums (ARIA)	30

Chart (2010)	Peak position
Greek Albums (IFPI)	5

Chart (2017)	Peak position
US Top Hard Rock Albums (Billboard)	19

Chart (2020)	Peak position
Hungarian Albums (MAHASZ)	35

Chart (2025)	Peak position
German Albums (Offizielle Top 100)	81
Scottish Albums (Official Charts)	49
UK Album Sales (OCC)	46
UK Rock & Metal Albums (Official Charts)	9

=== Year-end charts ===
Year-end chart performance to The Sickness
Chart (2000)	Position
US Billboard 200	133
Chart (2001)	Position
Canadian Albums (Nielsen SoundScan)	200
US Billboard 200	70
Chart (2002)	Position
Canadian Alternative Albums (Nielsen SoundScan)	89
Canadian Metal Albums (Nielsen SoundScan)	41

=== Decade-end charts ===
Decade-end chart performance for The Sickness
Chart (2000–2009)	Position
US Billboard 200	197

=== Singles ===
Year	Song	Chart	Peak position
2000	"Stupify"	Hot Mainstream Rock Tracks	12
2000	"Stupify"	Alternative Songs	10
2001	"Down with the Sickness"	Hot Mainstream Rock Tracks	5
2001	"Down with the Sickness"	Alternative Songs	8
2006	"Down with the Sickness"	Hot Ringtones	2
2000	"Voices"	Hot Mainstream Rock Tracks	16
2000	"Voices"	Alternative Songs	18
2001	"Voices"	UK Singles Chart	52
2002	"The Game"	Hot Mainstream Rock Tracks	34

== Certifications ==
Certifications for "The Sickness"
Region	Certification	Certified units/sales
Australia (ARIA)	Platinum	70,000^{^}
Canada (Music Canada)	3× Platinum	300,000^{‡}
New Zealand (RMNZ)	Platinum	15,000^{‡}
United Kingdom (BPI)	Gold	100,000^{*}
United States (RIAA)	5× Platinum	5,000,000^{‡}
^{*} Sales figures based on certification alone.^{^} Shipments figures based on certification alone.^{‡} Sales+streaming figures based on certification alone.
