= These Electric Pages Have Been Unplugged =

Studio album by Parabelle
- Released: May 24, 2011
- Genre: Alternative rock
- Length: 41:04
- Label: Independent
- Producer: Mike Langford

Parabelle chronology
Reassembling the Icons (2010)	These Electric Pages Have Been Unplugged (2011)	Your Starry Eyes Will Never Make Us Even (2012)

These Electric Pages Have Been Unplugged is an acoustic album by Canadian rock band Parabelle. Including 4 acoustic tracks from A Summit Borderline/A Drop Oceanic, 3 acoustic tracks from Reassembling the Icons, 2 new tracks, and 1 track - "Q", which was previously released by Kevin Matisyn's former band Evans Blue on the 2007 Album The Pursuit Begins When This Portrayal of Life Ends. It was released on May 24, 2011.

== Track listing ==
No.	Title	Length
1.	"When the World Wakes Up (feat. Jasmine Virginia)"	4:13
2.	"(I was told) To never let you"	4:00
3.	"Q (feat. Jasmine Virginia)"	4:44
4.	"First"	4:41
5.	"Out There"	4:13
6.	"The Conversation Ends"	4:51
7.	"The Clocks (feat. Jasmine Virginia)"	4:29
8.	"Us (Walk Away)"	4:17
9.	"Bend (feat. Jasmine Virginia)"	3:51
10.	"Are You Alarmed?"	6:23
Total length:		45:48
