= Grand World (disambiguation) =

Grand World may refer to:

- Grand World, 1997 album by the band Cool for August
- Grand World Phú Quốc, theme park in Vietnam
- Grand World Scenic Park, former amusement park located at Dongpu
