= Antioch Secret Society =

- Origin: Chicago, Illinois United States
- Genres: Alternative rock, electronic rock, hard rock, heavy metal
- Years active: 2005–present
- Labels: Xohol
- Members: Q Hashputin; Jesse Cokelahoma; Narcoticus
- Website: www.antiochsecretsociety.com

Antioch Secret Society is a rock band from Chicago, Illinois whose style draws from Heavy metal, jazz, electro, stoner rock and a diverse collection of genres. The band is currently signed to Xohol Distribution

Antioch Secret Society is one of the only Chicago Area bands that allows visual artists to display their work during performances. At every show, the band displays sequenced video art created by local and international video artists and animators. Due to this unique approach to their live shows, it has been noted that the band helps further the outreach of specifically Chicago area visual artists.

== History ==
The band formed in Chicago in 2005, and has played shows mostly in the Midwestern United States and the Southeastern United States. Antioch Secret Society has done numerous supporting tours and shows with bands such as Dry Kill Logic, Skindred, Parabelle, 32 Leaves, Dharmata, Imperial Battlesnake.

In 2006, it was written that it's hard to pin down one style do describe the sound, but it can be explained as '1975 meets 2025'

In 2007, Antioch Secret Society was runner up in MTV2 On The Rise's 'Play the VMA Awards' competition, winning Video Airplay for the song Sleep on MTV2 On Demand.

In July 2009, the band announced on their website that two new albums are to be released that year.

== Discography ==
- 2009 - Untitled
- 2007 - Soul Searching Monkey EP
- 2006 - Antioch Secret Society

== Band members ==
=== Current ===
- Q – Vocals, Programming
- Hashpütin – Guitar
- Jesse Cokelahoma – Bass
- Narcoticus – Drums

=== Previous ===
- Four Arms – Drums
