= The Pursuit =

The Pursuit may refer to:

- The Pursuit (song), a 2007 song by Evans Blue
- The Pursuit (album), a 2009 album by Jamie Cullum
- The Pursuit Begins When This Portrayal of Life Ends, commonly referred to as The Pursuit, a 2007 album by Evans Blue
