= 32 Leaves =

American rock band

- Origin: Phoenix, Arizona, U.S.
- Genres: Hard rock; post-grunge; nu metal
- Years active: 2001–2009, 2020—present
- Labels: Double Blind, Universal, 32 Leaves Music
- Past members: Greg Allen Norris; Mike Lopez; Mike Chavez; Aron Orosz; Barrett Gardner

32 Leaves is an American rock band from Phoenix, Arizona. After releasing their first full album Welcome to the Fall in 2005, they were able to attract major label support from Universal Records. However, plans fell through and they ended up releasing their second album, Panoramic, independently on March 15, 2009.

== History ==
=== Formation and Fik'shen EP (2001–2004) ===
The band formed in 2001 and played locally in Arizona for their first few years. Their first formal release of music was in 2003 with the Fik'shen EP. The EP had five tracks; the first three tracks, "Overflow", "Makeshift", and "Sudden Change", would later be reworked and re-recorded for their 2005 LP, Welcome to the Fall. The other two tracks, "Bruised and Break" and "Dissolved", had a different, softer sound than the majority of their work, and were never reworked. Additionally, the track "Interlude to Addiction", from Welcome to the Fall, is also on the EP, but as an intro to "Makeshift" rather than a separate track itself.

=== Welcome to the Fall (2005–2006) ===
In 2005, 32 Leaves recorded and mixed their debut album Welcome to the Fall with Larry "Love" Elyea of Bionic Jive fame, at The Salt Mine and Mind's Eye Digital. The album included artwork from friend and artist Jon McLaughlin (not the singer from Indiana) inside the album jacket.

In the same year, they also contributed a cover of The Smashing Pumpkins song "Zero" for The Killer in You: A Tribute to Smashing Pumpkins.

Welcome to the Fall was released on September 6, 2005, on Double Blind records, a minor record label. In the following years, the band supported the album and toured with such acts as 10 Years, Crossfade, Dredg, Evans Blue, Fair to Midland, Smile Empty Soul, and Trapt.

=== Panoramic (2007–2009) ===
Due to the extensive touring in support of Welcome to the Fall, they were able to attract the support of a major record label, Universal Records. 32 Leaves recorded two singles, a new version of "All Is Numb" and new song "Way Beyond", in October 2007, collaborating with famed producer Elvis Basquette. The band released the songs on iTunes shortly thereafter, as a preview of what they were working on.

The band parted ways with both Universal Republic and Double Blind music releasing Panoramic independently in 2008

While the band toured some in 2008/2009 in support of the album, they disbanded in 2010.

In January 2020, the band reunited and played a sold out concert in an Arizona club Last Exit Live.

The band is currently working on their first collection of recorded songs, since 2009 with an unofficial release date set in 2024.

== Members ==
- Greg Allen Norris − vocals
- Mike Lopez − guitar
- Mike Chavez − guitar
- Aron Orosz − bass
- Barrett Gardner − drums

== Discography ==
=== Albums ===
- Fik'shen [EP] (2003)
- Welcome to the Fall (2005)
- Panoramic (2009)

=== Singles ===
- "All Is Numb" (2005)
- "Blood on My Hands" (2005)
- "Never Even There" (2005)
- "Way Beyond" (2007)
- "Human" (2009)
- "What We've Lost" (2024)
- "Of the Fire" (2025)
- "Out of Places" (2025)

== Side projects ==
- Greg Norris has provided vocals on Kevin Matisyn's song "Bad Times".
- Norris also produced Parabelle's double-album A Summit Borderline/A Drop Oceanic.
- As of 2011, lead singer Greg Norris is in a new band called Codec. Codec released an EP in early 2012. They then released a full-length album, Horizontime on November 30, 2012, which included all five songs from the EP and nine new tracks.
- In 2015, former members Greg Norris, Mike Lopez and Barrett Gardner started a new band, M.E.N.D. They released their debut EP, Prisms on December 10, 2016, which was recorded with Cory Spotts of Bluelight Audio Media.
- In December 2017, Greg Norris formed the band Retina with band members Chris Bedan, Ken Hoyt, and Scott Root. They released their self-titled EP in August 2018 which contains six tracks, and most recently released a single "Winters Return" on December 10, 2019.
