= Cold (But I'm Still Here) =

Single by Evans Blue

from the album The Melody and the Energetic Nature of Volume
- Released: December 13, 2005
- Recorded: 2005
- Genre: Alternative metal, post-grunge
- Length: 3:53
- Label: Hollywood
- Songwriters: Kevin James Clarkson, Joseph Daniel Lauzon
- Producer: Trevor Kustiak

Evans Blue singles chronology
"Cold (But I'm Still Here)" (2005)	"Over" (2006)

Music video
- "Cold (But I'm Still Here)" on YouTube

"Cold (But I'm Still Here)" is the first single off Canadian rock band Evans Blue's debut album, The Melody and the Energetic Nature of Volume. The song was released December 13, 2005, two months prior to the album release, and garnered frequent radio play in anticipation of the upcoming album. Evans Blue's official Myspace, explains the meaning of this song as well as others by the group. A music video was also produced for "Cold (But I'm Still Here)."

On April 28, 2006, The Edge released an exclusive acoustic version on their 2006 acoustic compilation album.

== Track listing ==
Digital single
No.	Title	Writer(s)	Length
1.	"Cold (But I'm Still Here)"	Kevin James Clarkson, Joseph Daniel Lauzon	3:53

== Charts ==
=== Weekly charts ===
Weekly chart performance for "Cold (But I'm Still Here)"
Chart (2006)	Peak position
US Alternative Airplay (Billboard)	28
US Mainstream Rock Airplay (Billboard)	8

=== Year-end charts ===
Year-end chart performance for "Cold (But I'm Still Here)"
Chart (2006)	Position
US Mainstream Rock Songs (Billboard)	22
