= Sick of It (disambiguation) =

Sick of it may refer to:

- A phrase indicating depression, frustration or disgust
- "Sick of It" (song), 2013 song by Skillet
- "Sick of It", a 2008 song by Michelle Williams from her album Unexpected
- "Sick of It" (song), a 2020 song by Vanic
- "Sick of It" (song), a 2009 song by Evans Blue from their eponymous album Evans Blue (album)
- "Sick of It" (song), a 1989 song by the Primitives from the album Pure (The Primitives album)
- Sick of It (TV series), 2018 United Kingdom television show
- "Sick of It" (TV episode), a 2009 season 1 episode of Delocated; see List of Delocated episodes
- "Sick of It", a 2022 song by Jean Dawson from his album Chaos Now

== See also ==
- "I'm Sick of It" (질릴만도한데), a 2012 single by Bumzu
