= Over (Evans Blue song) =

Single by Evans Blue

from the album The Melody and the Energetic Nature of Volume
- Released: July 10, 2006
- Genre: Alternative rock, post-grunge
- Length: 3:39
- Label: Hollywood
- Songwriters: Kevin Matisyn and Parker Lauzon
- Producer: Trevor Kustiak

Evans Blue singles chronology
"Cold (But I'm Still Here)" (2005)	"Over" (2006)	"Beg" (2006)

"Over" is a song by Canadian rock band Evans Blue. It was released on 10 July 2006, as the second single from Evans Blue's debut album The Melody and the Energetic Nature of Volume. Matisyn and Pitter claim that 'Over' is the song that holds the most meaning to them.

The song garnered little attention on the radio, only peaking at #28 on the U.S Mainstream Rock Charts, compared to their first single, "Cold (But I'm Still Here)", which peaked at #8, as well as #28 on the U.S. Modern Rock Charts, which "Over" missed completely. It is now rarely played on radio, as "Cold" is the usual song played.

== Cover versions ==
- Canadian industrial artist Model M covered the song on his album "Letters to Jesus" in 2009.
