= Erase My Scars =

Single by Evans Blue

from the album Evans Blue (re-release)
- Released: June 22, 2010
- Recorded: 2010
- Genre: Hard rock, alternative metal, post-grunge
- Length: 3:24
- Label: Sounds+Sights, FOF Label Group/EMI
- Songwriters: Dan Chandler, Joseph Lauzon
- Producer: Trevor Kustiak

Evans Blue singles chronology
"Bulletproof" (2009)	"Erase My Scars" (2010)	"Say It" (2011)

Music video
- "Erase My Scars" on YouTube

"Erase My Scars" is a song by Canadian rock band Evans Blue. It was released in July 2010, as the third single from Evans Blue's self-titled album. The song is dedicated to lead singer Dan Chandler's nephew, who died from brain cancer at the age of eight. A music video was shot and directed by Adrian Picardi and produced by Eric Ro of Northern Five Entertainment. "Erase My Scars" peaked at number forty-five on the Billboard Rock Songs chart. An acoustic version was exclusively released on KUPD's acoustic 2010 compilation album.

== Track listing ==
Digital single
No.	Title	Writer(s)	Length
1.	"Erase My Scars"	Dan Chandler, Joseph Lauzon	3:24
