= Welcome to the Fall =

Studio album by 32 Leaves
- Released: September 6, 2005
- Recorded: 2005
- Studio: The Salt Mine (Mesa, Arizona) Mind's Eye Digital (Mesa, Arizona)
- Genre: Hard rock, post-grunge, nu metal
- Length: 41:33
- Label: Double Blind
- Producer: Larry "Love" Elyea, 32 Leaves

32 Leaves chronology
Fik'Shen (2003)	Welcome to the Fall (2005)	Panoramic (2009)

Professional ratings
Review scores
Source	Rating
AbsolutePunk	(73%)
Decoy Music	3.5/4 stars
Splendid	(mixed)

Welcome to the Fall is the debut album of Arizona-based hard rock/post-grunge band 32 Leaves, released September 6, 2005. The band recorded and mixed it with Larry "Love" Elyea of Bionic Jive fame, at The Salt Mine and Mind's Eye Digital. Welcome to the Fall was not widely promoted and never charted.

== Touring and promotion ==
During 2006 and 2007, 32 Leaves supported the album on tour and shared stages with such acts as 10 Years, Crossfade, Dredg, Evans Blue, Fair To Midland, Smile Empty Soul, and Trapt.

The track "All is Numb" had a music video and found considerable airplay on the Sirius Satellite Radio station, Octane. It would remain in the Top 5 of the 'Octane Top 20 Countdown' for at least 10 weeks. While the track boasts a commercially accessible sound, its interlude contains profanity in the repeated line, "I guess my thinking too much is what's been fucking me up." This may point to its exclusion from conventional radio. The song "Blood on My Hands" also had a video produced for it. In 2007, "Waiting" appeared on the soundtrack to the video game FlatOut: Ultimate Carnage.

== Track listing ==
1. "Sudden Change" – 3:42
2. "Blood on My Hands" – 3:32
3. "Never Even There" – 3:10
4. "Your Lies" – 4:07
5. "Wide Awake" – 4:24
6. "Waiting" – 3:19
7. "Interlude to Addiction" – 0:32
8. "Makeshift" – 4:08
9. "Overflow" – 3:31
10. "All Is Numb" – 4:23
11. "Watching You Disappear" – 3:37
12. "Deep Breath" – 3:08

=== Bonus ===
- Enhanced CD "Blood on My Hands" video

== Personnel ==
- Greg Allen Norris – vocals
- Mike Lopez – guitar
- Mike Chavez – guitar
- Aron Orosz – bass
- Barrett Gardner – drums
