= Reassembling the Icons =

Reassembling The Icons

Studio album by Parabelle
- Released: November 15, 2010
- Genre: Alternative rock
- Length: 48:48
- Label: Independent
- Producer: Michael Langford

Parabelle chronology
A Summit Borderline/A Drop Oceanic (2009)	Reassembling The Icons (2010)	These Electric Pages Have Been Unplugged (2011)

Singles from Reassembling the Icons
- 1. "More" Released: June 29, 2010

Reassembling the Icons is the second studio album by Canadian rock band Parabelle. It was released on November 15, 2010.

== Track listing ==
No.	Title	Length
1.	"The Clocks"	3:25
2.	"More"	3:50
3.	"Don't Stop to Breathe"	4:08
4.	"Kiss the Flag: The Widow" (Matisyn, Joseph Lauzon, Vladamir Tanaskovic)	3:17
5.	"When the World Wakes Up"	3:23
6.	"On the Curve"	3:31
7.	"Lifted"	3:49
8.	"Out There"	3:29
9.	"The Devil Inside Me"	3:34
10.	"Reassembling the Icons"	4:11
11.	"Twisted and Turned"	7:45
12.	"Pray"	4:26
Total length:		48:48

== Personnel ==
- Kevin Matisyn – vocals
- Aaron Burton – lead guitar
- Kyle Mathis – rhythm guitar
- Chris "Gio" Giovenco - bass
- Jordan Hatfield - drums
