= Panoramic (album) =

Studio album by 32 Leaves
- Released: March 15, 2007
- Genre: Post-grunge
- Label: 32 Leaves Music

32 Leaves chronology
Welcome to the Fall (2005)	Panoramic (2007)

Professional ratings
Review scores
Source	Rating
TuneLab Music	7/10 stars

Panoramic is the second and final studio album from Arizona post-grunge band 32 Leaves. An alternate version of "Way Beyond" had been released on December 17, 2007 to iTunes and other digital retailers. The new, alternate version of "All Is Numb," released around the same time, did not make the cut.

== Track listing ==
1. "Intro" – 0:27
2. "Protocol" – 2:51
3. "Disarray" – 2:42
4. "Way Beyond" – 3:54
5. "Seal My Fate" – 3:20
6. "Slave" – 3:37
7. "Sideways" – 3:21
8. "Human" – 3:51
9. "Erase All Memory" – 3:24
10. "Safe Haven" – 4:38
11. "Endless Shadows" – 4:02
12. "No Meaning" – 2:55
13. "Only Want to Mend" – 3:49

Unreleased

- All is Numb (New version)
