= Evans Blue (album) =

Studio album by Evans Blue
- Released: June 23, 2009 (Digital download); July 27, 2010 (CD)
- Genres: Alternative metal; hard rock; alternative rock; post-grunge
- Length: 38:02
- Labels: Sounds+Sights, EMI
- Producer: Trevor Kustiak

Evans Blue chronology
The Pursuit Begins When This Portrayal of Life Ends (2007)	Evans Blue (2009)	Graveyard of Empires (2012)

Singles from Evans Blue
- 1. "Sick of It" Released: April 13, 2009; 2. "Bulletproof" Released: September 23, 2009; 3. "Say It" Released: February 1, 2011

Singles from Evans Blue (re-release)
- 1. "Erase My Scars" Released: June 22, 2010

Professional ratings
Review scores
Source	Rating
AllMusic	3.5/5 stars

Evans Blue is the third studio album by Canadian rock band Evans Blue. It is the first to feature singer Dan Chandler and the last to feature drummer Howard Davis.

== Singles ==
The first single from the album is "Sick of It", which was made available on the band's Myspace page before its official release. "Bulletproof" and "Erase My Scars" were released as the second and third singles respectively. Erase My Scars peaked at #45 on the Rock Songs Chart and is Evans Blue's first charting single since "The Pursuit" in 2007. The final single, "Say It", was released on February 1, 2011.

== Track listing ==
No.	Title	Writer(s)	Length
1.	"Buried Alive"	Dan Chandler, Parker Lauzon, Vlad Tanaskovic	3:17
2.	"Sick of It"	Chandler, Lauzon, Joe Pitter	3:01
3.	"The Future in the End"	Chandler, Lauzon	3:38
4.	"A Step Back"	Chandler	3:25
5.	"Say It"	Chandler, Lauzon	3:13
6.	"Who We Are"	Chandler, Lauzon	3:44
7.	"Bulletproof"	Chandler, Lauzon	3:29
8.	"I Blame You"	Chandler, Lauzon	3:21
9.	"Through Your Eyes"	Chandler, Lauzon, Tanaskovic	3:49
10.	"Show Me"	Chandler, Lauzon	3:30
11.	"Can't Go On"	Chandler, Lauzon, Tanaskovic	3:37
Total length:			38:02

EMI Re-release bonus track
No.	Title	Writer(s)	Length
12.	"Erase My Scars"	Chandler, Lauzon	3:24
Total length:			41:26

== Personnel ==
Evans Blue

- Dan Chandler - vocals
- Parker Lauzon - rhythm guitar
- Vlad Tanaskovic - lead guitar
- Joe Pitter - bass
- Howard Davis - drums

Production

- Produced by Trevor Kustiak
- Mixed by Mark Makoway
- Executive producer - Mark Dew
- Engineered by Dennis Tougas, Jeff Pelletier and Lucas Johnson
- Mastered by Robert Vosgien at Capitol Studios, Los Angeles
- Recorded at Phase One-The Pocket-GBP-The Garage Studios

Additional musicians

- Kevin Fox - cellos on "A Step Back"
