= Fight or Flight (band) =

American rock band

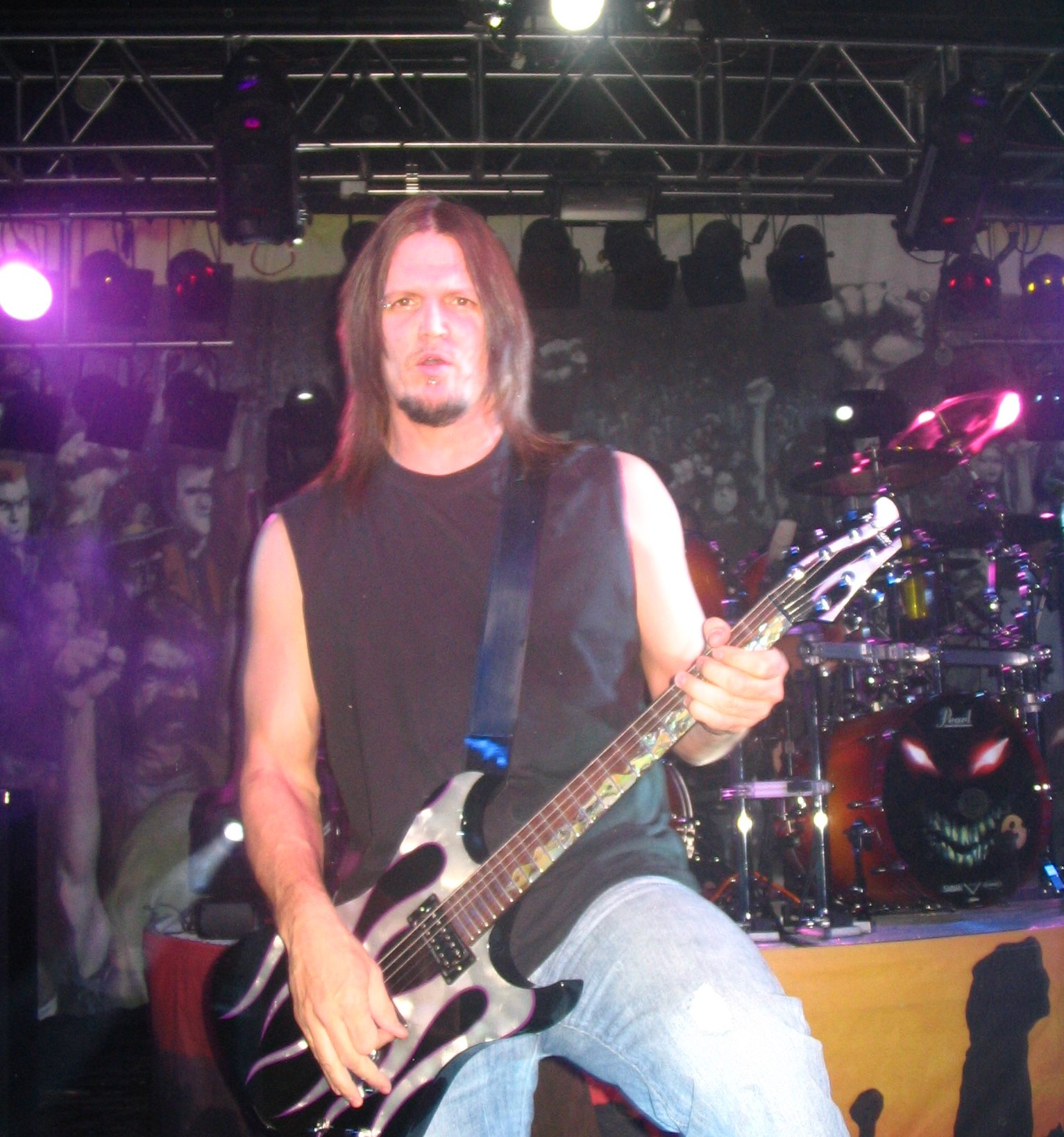
- Lead guitarist Dan Donegan at Starland ballroom, December 8, 2005

Background information
- Genres: Alternative metal; hard rock; post-grunge
- Years active: 2013
- Label: Warner Bros.
- Members: Dan Donegan; Mike Wengren; Dan Chandler; Sean Corcoran; Jeremy Jayson
- Website: fightorflightofficial.com

Fight or Flight was an American rock band started by Disturbed members Dan Donegan and Mike Wengren. The band's members consisted of guitarists Dan Donegan and Jeremy Jayson, vocalist Dan Chandler, bassist Sean Corcoran, and drummer Mike Wengren. Fight or Flight released their debut single, First of the Last, on May 21, 2013. Their debut album and only album, titled A Life by Design?, was released on July 23, 2013. via Warner Bros. Records.

== History ==
=== 2011–2013: Formation ===
In 2011, when Dan Donegan's and Mike Wengren's band Disturbed was on hiatus, Dan began to intensely miss touring and recording. He began writing songs on his own and later reached out to Evans Blue's lead vocalist, Dan Chandler, in an attempt to collaborate. When the two had enough material to record, Donegan approached Wengren about forming a side project. The three entered the recording studio to put together some songs.

To complete the Fight or Flight lineup, Ra’s Sean Corcoran joined the project to play bass and back vocals. In addition, Bellevue Suite's Jeremy Jayson joined to play guitar and back vocals, completing the band. They signed with Warner Bros. Records in 2013. As Fight or Flight began as a side project, the band members quickly began to experiment with different acoustic guitars and electronics.

=== 2013: A Life by Design? ===
After signing a deal with Warner Bros. Records in 2013, the band released their debut single "First of the Last". The single began receiving radio airplay on May 21, 2013. On May 7, 2013, Fight or Flight's debut album, A Life by Design?, was made available for pre-order on iTunes, including a download for the band's debut single. A Life by Design? was officially released on July 23, 2013, via Warner Bros. Records.

== Band members ==
- Dan Donegan – lead guitar
- Dan Chandler – lead vocals
- Mike Wengren – drums
- Sean Corcoran – bass, backing vocals
- Jeremy Jayson – rhythm guitar, backing vocals

== Discography ==
=== Studio albums ===
- A Life by Design? (2013)

=== Singles ===
Year	Single	Peak chart positions	Album
Year	Single	US Main	Album
2013	"First of the Last"	34	A Life by Design?
"—" denotes the single failed to chart, or not released.

=== Music videos ===
- First of the Last (2013)
