= A Life by Design? =

Studio album by Fight or Flight
- Released: July 23, 2013
- Genre: Hard rock; alternative metal; heavy metal
- Length: 41:48
- Label: Warner Bros.
- Producer: Dan Donegan

Singles from A Life by Design?
- 1. "First of the Last" Released: May 21, 2013

A Life by Design? is the only studio album by American hard rock band Fight or Flight, released on July 23, 2013. The debut single, "First of the Last", was released on May 7, 2013, with its radio airplay beginning on May 21, 2013.

== Track listing ==
All tracks are written by Fight or Flight

No.	Title	Length
1.	"First of the Last"	3:25
2.	"Emphatic"	3:17
3.	"It's Over"	3:58
4.	"Eraser"	3:31
5.	"Leaving"	3:51
6.	"If It Hurts"	3:08
7.	"You Refuse"	3:23
8.	"The Average"	3:22
9.	"Take a Shot"	3:22
10.	"A Void"	3:54
11.	"Shine"	2:58
12.	"Tragedy"	3:56
Total length:		41:48

iTunes deluxe edition bonus tracks
No.	Title	Length
13.	"Sacrifice"	3:09
14.	"Some Heads Are Gonna Roll" (Judas Priest cover)	4:16
Total length:		49:13

== Credits ==
- Dan Chandler- vocals
- Dan Donegan - guitars, bass, piano, electronics, string arrangements, backing vocals
- Mike Wengren- drums, percussion, backing vocals

Production

- Dan Donegan - producer, mixing
- Matt Dougherty - engineering, mixing
- Ted Jensen - mastering
- Donny Phillips - Art direction
- David Dess - illustrated
- Dan Machnik - photography

== Charts ==
Chart (2013)	Peak position
US Billboard 200	87
US Billboard Rock Albums	27
US Billboard Hard Rock Albums	8
