= Graveyard of Empires (album) =

Studio album by Evans Blue
- Released: April 17, 2012
- Genre: Alternative metal
- Length: 42:54
- Label: Sounds+Sights
- Producer: Trevor Kustiak

Evans Blue chronology
Evans Blue (2009)	Graveyard of Empires (2012)	Letters From the Dead (2016)

Singles from Graveyard of Empires
- 1. "This Time It's Different" Released: September 28, 2011; 2. "Halo" Released: December 13, 2011; 3. "Beyond the Stars" Released: April 17, 2012

Graveyard of Empires is the fourth studio album by Canadian rock band Evans Blue, released on April 17, 2012. The album has three singles, "This Time It's Different", "Halo", and "Beyond The Stars.

== Track listing ==
No.	Title	Length
1.	"This Time It's Different"	3:29
2.	"Crawl Inside"	3:35
3.	"Thank You"	3:42
4.	"Beyond the Stars"	3:42
5.	"Graveyard of Empires" (instrumental)	2:49
6.	"Alone Not Lonely"	3:24
7.	"In the Shadow"	3:30
8.	"Live to Die"	3:42
9.	"Destroy the Obvious"	3:48
10.	"Warrior"	4:05
11.	"Underwater"	3:26
12.	"Halo"	3:42
Total length:		42:54

== Personnel ==
Evans Blue

- Dan Chandler – vocals
- Parker Lauzon – rhythm guitar
- Vlad "V" Tanaskovic – lead guitar, piano
- Joe Pitter – bass

Additional musicians

- Mike McClure – drums
- Jason Pierce – drums
- Steve Blacke – string arrangements
- Trevor Kustiak – programming

Production

- Trevor Kustiak – producer
- Dan Korneff – mixing
- Ted Jensen – mastering
- Mari Drew – executive producer
- Jake Lichty – cover art, package design
- Jeff Mintline – photography
