= Gordon Vaughn =

American singer

Gordon Vaughn was the lead singer of the rock band Cool for August. He originally grew up in Los Angeles before later moving to Atlanta with Cool for August in 1997.

With the disbanding of Cool for August in 2001, Gordon stepped back from the mainstream music scene. He is currently a freelance producer and artist. In 2003 he wrote, produced, and took lead vocals on the song, "Broken Hearts, Broken Lands" for the independent songwriting/producing firm Egg's Productions. He also produced a rap song, "Lucky Charm" for the same company.
