= Daguannanlu station =

Metro station in Guangzhou, China

Daguannanlu 大观南路
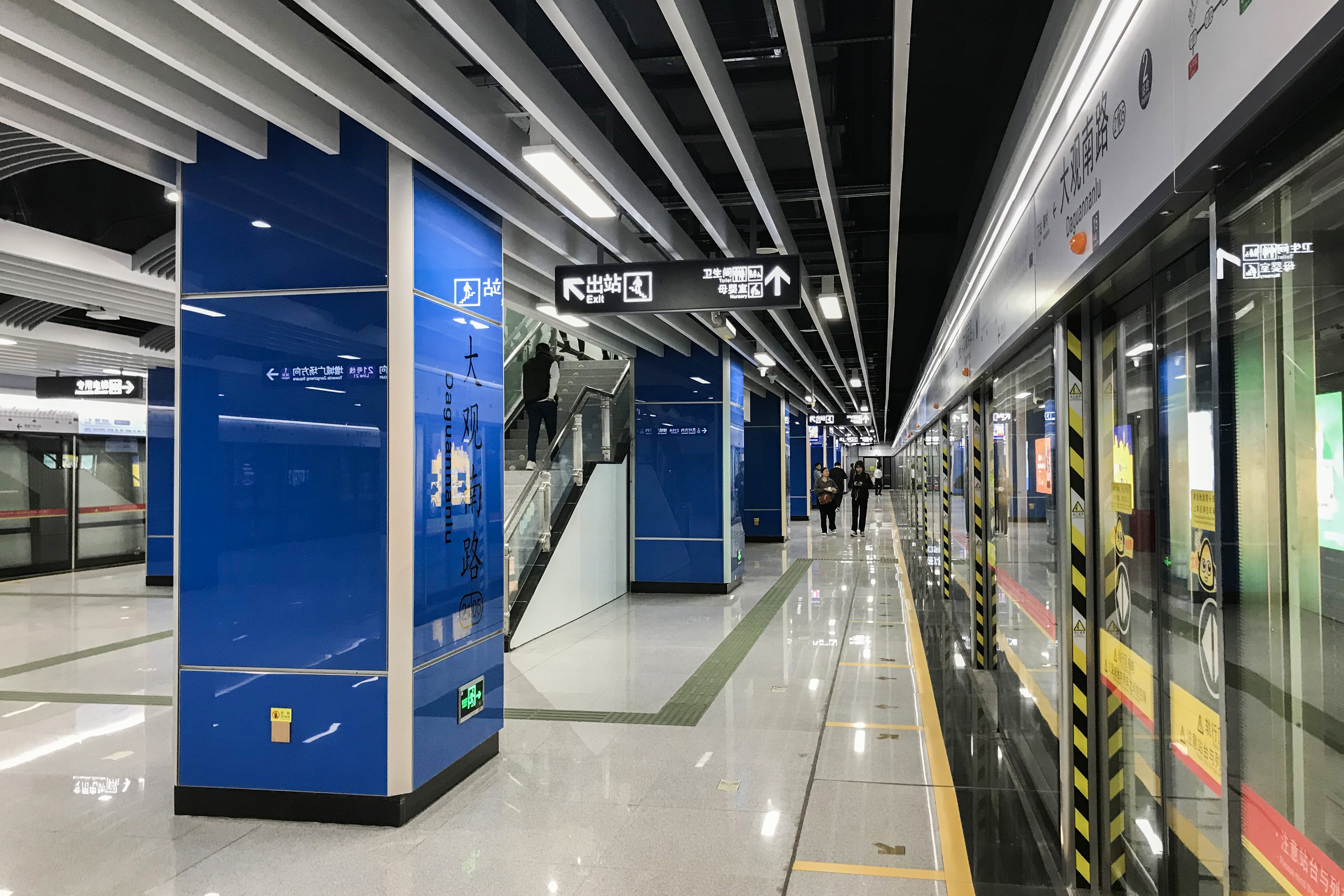
- Platform 2

Chinese name
- Simplified Chinese: 大观南路站
- Traditional Chinese: 大觀南路站
Transcriptions

General information
- Location: Daguannanlu (Daguannan Road), Tianhe District, Guangzhou, Guangdong; China
- Coordinates: 23.1472°N 113.4013°E
- Operated by: Guangzhou Metro Co. Ltd.
- Line: Line 21
- Platforms: 2 (1 island platform)
- Tracks: 2

Construction
- Structure type: Underground
- Accessible: Yes

Other information
- Station code: 2105

History
- Opened: 20 December 2019; 6 years ago

Services
Preceding station	Guangzhou Metro	Following station
Huangcun towards Tianhe Park	Line 21	Tianhe Smart City towards Zengcheng Square
Location

Daguannanlu station (Chinese: 大观南路站; pinyin: Dàguānnánlù zhàn) is a station on Line 21 of the Guangzhou Metro. It opened on 20 December 2019 along with the western section of Line 21.

The original planned name of the station in 2003 was Grand World Scenic Park Station (世界大观站). Due to its proximity to the nearby Grand World Scenic Park. But then because the park closed down in 2009, and regulations did not allow the name of the station to be named after a commercial institution, the name of the station was changed to a nearby road, Daguannan Road.

== Exits ==
There are 2 exits, lettered A and B. Exit B is accessible. Both exits are located on Daguannan Road.

== Gallery ==
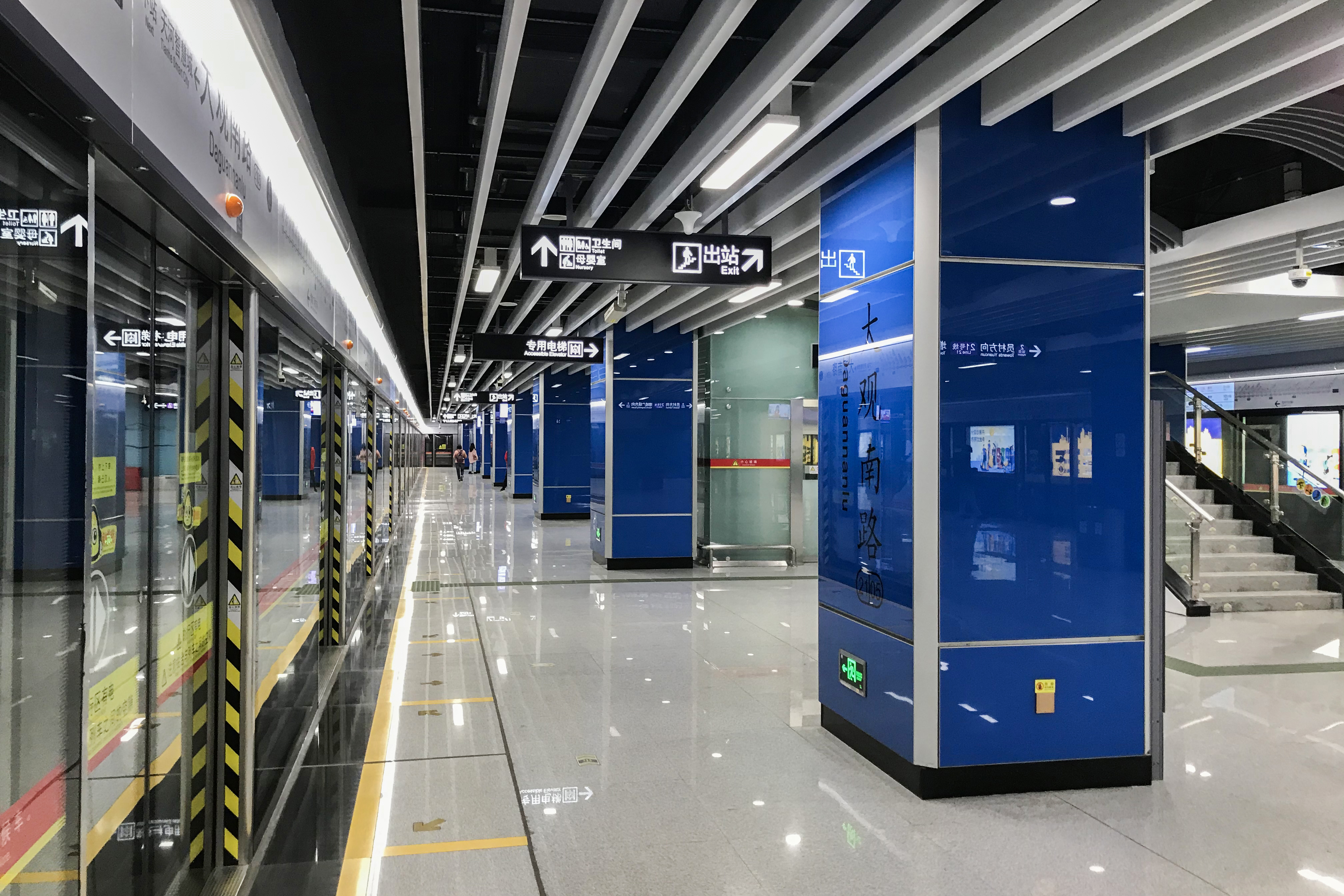
Platform 1

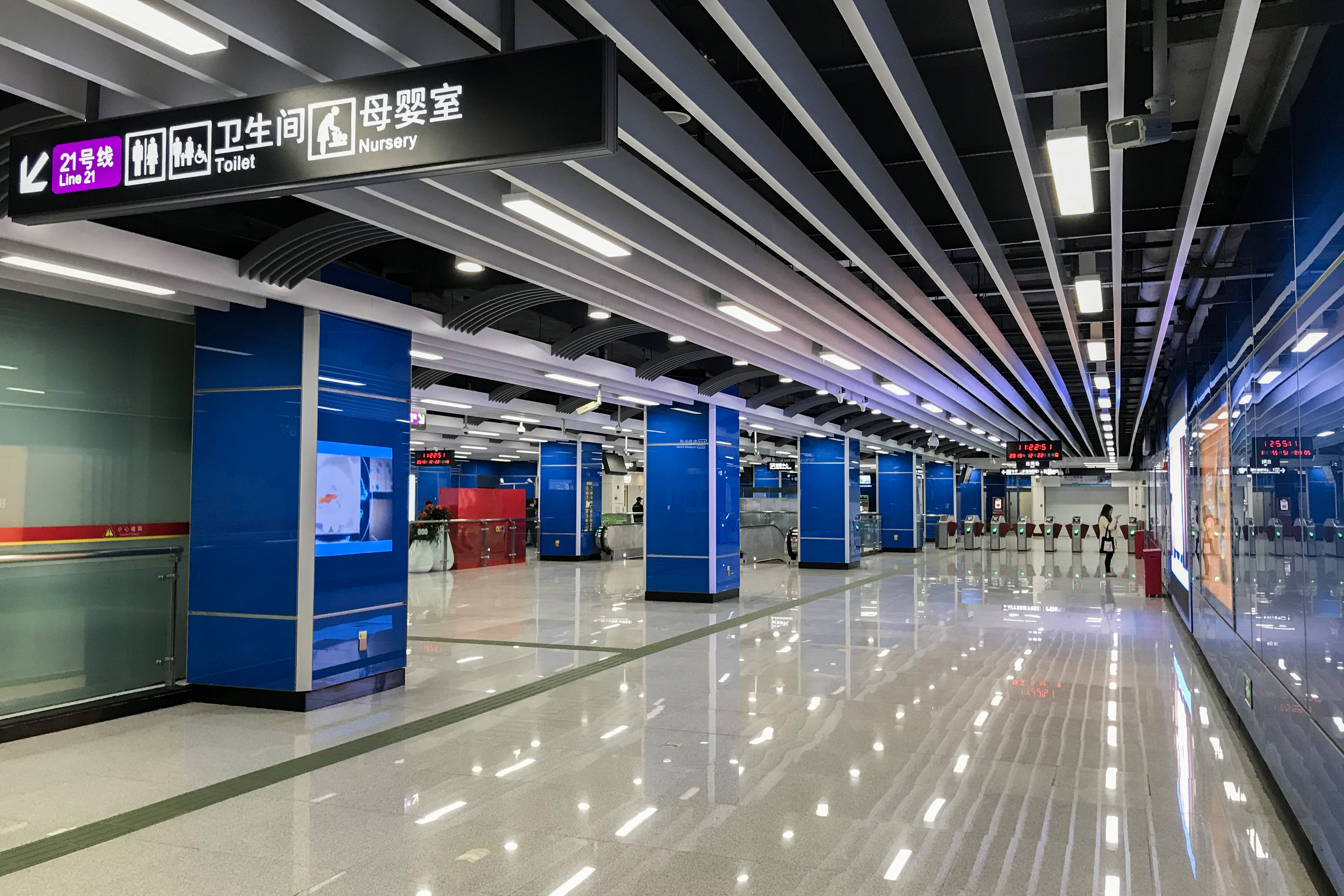
Concourse
