= Cool for August =

American rock band

- Origin: United States
- Genres: Rock
- Years active: 1993–2001; 2011
- Labels: Warner Bros.
- Past members: Gordon Vaughn; Trevor Kustiak; Andrew Shives; Shane Hills; Shad Hills; Chris Harris; Larry Voss

Cool for August was an American rock band from Los Angeles.

While the group formed in Los Angeles, only vocalist Gordon Vaughn was from the city; songwriter/guitarist Shad Hills, guitarist Trevor Kustiak, and drummer Shane Hills were Canadian, and bassist Andrew Shives was from Maryland. Shives had previously played for Fear Factory in the early 1990s. Shane Hills was replaced by Larry Voss in the spring of 2000. The group charted three hit singles at US rock radio, "Don't Wanna Be Here", "Walk Away", and "Trials"; "Don't Wanna Be Here" was also a minor hit in Australia. They made their television debut on Late Night with Conan O'Brien with the song "Trials". While it was not their highest-charting single, "Walk Away" received its own single in stores. The group did a national tour with Matchbox 20 in 1998.

The band resurfaced a few years later in 2001 with an online single "Say it isn't So". The band added bandmate Chris Harris, guitar and violin, and completed a demo of six songs (produced by Jeff Tomei and Joey Huffman), about half of an anticipated upcoming album. However, with no more support from Warner Brothers or any other major labels, the band called it quits.

With the disbanding of Cool for August in 2001, Gordon stepped back from the mainstream music scene. He later worked as a freelance producer and artist. In 2003 he wrote, produced, and took lead vocals on the song, "Broken Hearts, Broken Lands" for the independent songwriting/producing firm Egg's Productions. He also produced a rap song, "Lucky Charm" for the same company.

Trevor Kustiak formed The Pocket Studios with Mike Turner (Our Lady Peace, Fair Ground, Crash Carma) and produced albums for Evans Blue and Rains.

In 2001 Drummer Shane Hills legally changed his name to Moon Hills. He has recorded over 100 records for international acts all over the world. Moon was involved with Blacklist Union in 2006 through 2010 recording and touring on their breakthrough album After The Mourning as well as the follow-up Breakin Bread With The Devil.

Larry Voss left the music industry and is now the founder and president of Universal Servo group.

Cool for August reunited in summer of 2011. The band started recording their second album, but decided to part ways again without releasing any new material.

== Discography ==
=== Albums ===
List of albums, with Australian chart positions
Title	Album details	Peak chart positions
Title	Album details	AUS
Grand World	Released: June 1997; Format: CD; Label: Warner Bros. Records	78

=== EPs ===
- MilkinSorgin (1997)

=== Singles ===
List of single, with listedchart positions
Year	Title	Peak chart positions		Album
Year	Title	U.S. Rock	AUS	Album
1997	"Don't Wanna Be Here"	15	91	Grand World
1997	"Trials"	24	—	Grand World
1998	"Walk Away"	16	—	Grand World
2001	"Say It Isn't So"	—	—	released online
