= A Summit Borderline/A Drop Oceanic =

Studio album by Parabelle
- Released: July 7, 2009 (U.S.)
- Genre: Alternative metal; post-grunge
- Length: 85:29
- Label: independent
- Producer: Greg Allen Norris

Parabelle chronology
A Summit Borderline/A Drop Oceanic (2009)	Reassembling the Icons (2010)

Professional ratings
Review scores
Source	Rating
Sputnikmusic	link
Rotten Tomatoes	link

A Summit Borderline/A Drop Oceanic is the debut studio album by Canadian rock band Parabelle. It was released on July 7, 2009 independently.

It was released as a double album and consists of A Summit Borderline and A Drop Oceanic.

== Reception ==
The album has an excellent rating (4 out of 5 stars) on Sputnikmusic who stated, "Parabelle manages to be much darker and emotionally plausible than their contemporaries largely due to a genuinely brilliant performance of Kevin Matisyn."

== Track listing ==
=== A Summit Borderline ===
No.	Title	Length
1.	"Pray to the Pessimist"	3:55
2.	"Are You Alarmed?"	4:09
3.	"Atonement"	4:11
4.	"The Conversation Ends"	4:36
5.	"He Started Off Well"	4:13
6.	"First"	3:59
7.	"Face This Charade"	3:45
8.	"Whore"	3:26
9.	"When The Last Words Are Sighs"	3:54
10.	"A Summit Borderline"	7:09
Total length:		43:17

=== A Drop Oceanic ===
No.	Title	Length
1.	"Blur"	5:48
2.	"Stay Close"	4:52
3.	"Bother"	3:30
4.	"(I Was Told) To Never Let You Go"	3:43
5.	"Made Of"	3:28
6.	"In My Soul"	3:36
7.	"Puppet on a String"	4:41
8.	"Eternity's Behind 4 Hours"	2:02
9.	"Terrified (Get Me Out Alive)"	3:58
10.	"A Drop in the Ocean"	6:25
Total length:		42:03

== Personnel ==
- Kevin Matisyn – Vocals
- Chris "Gio" Giovenco – Bass
- Tim Huskinson – Rhythm guitar and Lead guitar
- Miles Stelzig – Lead guitar and Rhythm guitar
- Blaine Porpiglia – Drums
