= Tianhe Smart City station =

Guangzhou Metro station

Tianhe Smart City 天河智慧城
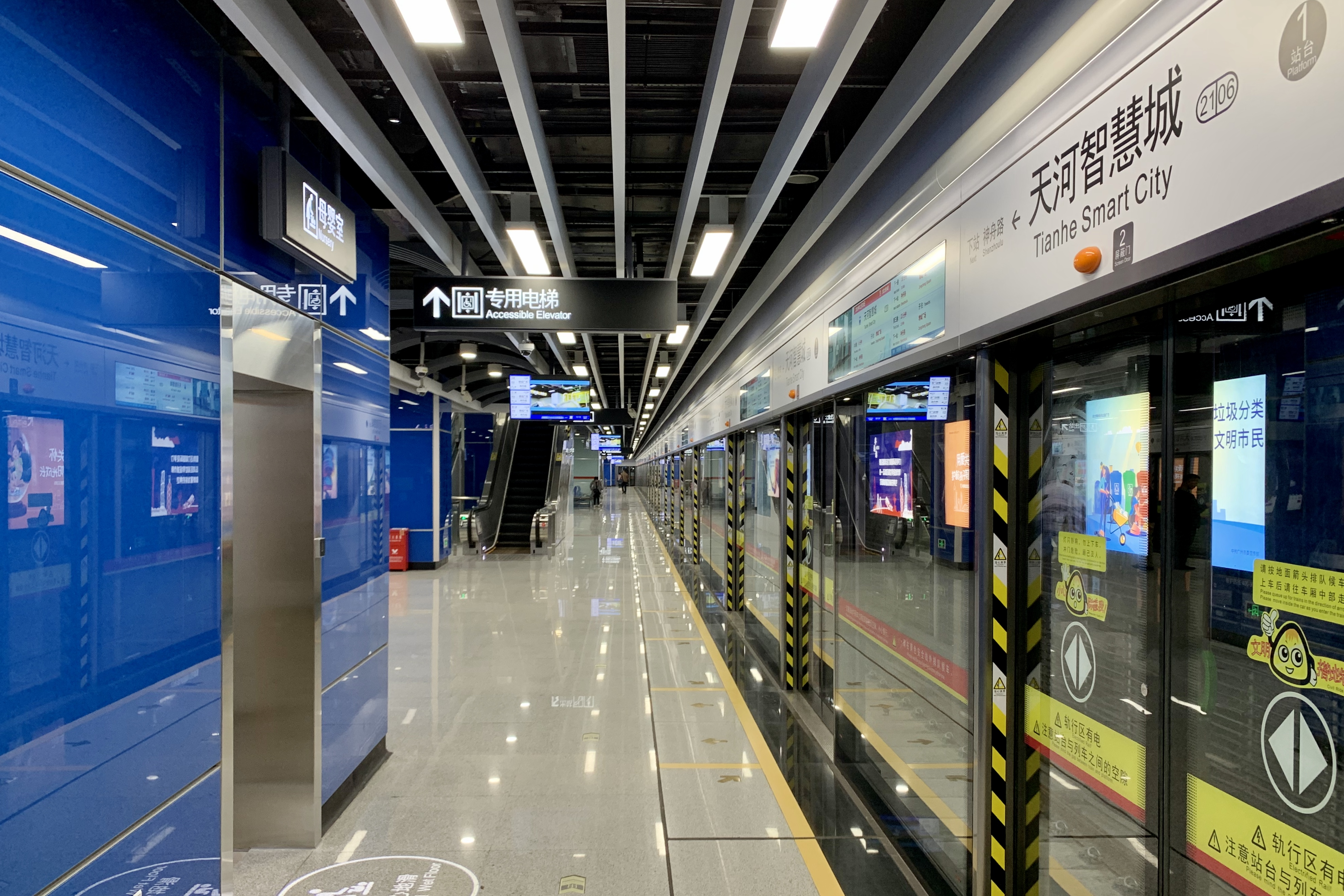
- Platform 1

Chinese name
- Simplified Chinese: 天河智慧城站
- Traditional Chinese: 天河智慧城站
Transcriptions

General information
- Location: Gaotang Lu, Xinling Four Road south of Gaotang Lu (高唐路); Tianhe District, Guangzhou, Guangdong; China
- Coordinates: 23°17′04″N 113°35′35″E
- Operator: Guangzhou Metro Co. Ltd.
- Line: Line 21
- Platforms: 2 (1 island platform)
- Tracks: 2

Construction
- Structure type: Underground
- Accessible: Yes

Other information
- Station code: 2106

History
- Opened: 20 December 2019; 6 years ago

Services
Preceding station	Guangzhou Metro	Following station
Daguannanlu towards Tianhe Park	Line 21	Shenzhoulu towards Zengcheng Square
Huangcun towards Tianhe Park	Line 21 Express	Shenzhoulu towards Zengcheng Square
Location

Tianhe Smart City station (Chinese: 天河智慧城站) is a station of Line 21 on the Guangzhou Metro. It started operations on 20 December 2019.

== Station layout ==
L1; Concourse	Lobby	Customer Service, Vending machines, ATMs, Exits
L2; Platforms	Platform 2	21 towards Tianhe Park (Daguannanlu / express: Huangcun)
L2; Platforms	Island platform, doors will open on the left
L2; Platforms	Platform 1	21 towards Zengcheng Square (Shenzhoulu)

== Exits ==
There are 4 exits, lettered A, B, C and D. Exit A is accessible. All exits are located on Gaotang Road.

== Gallery ==
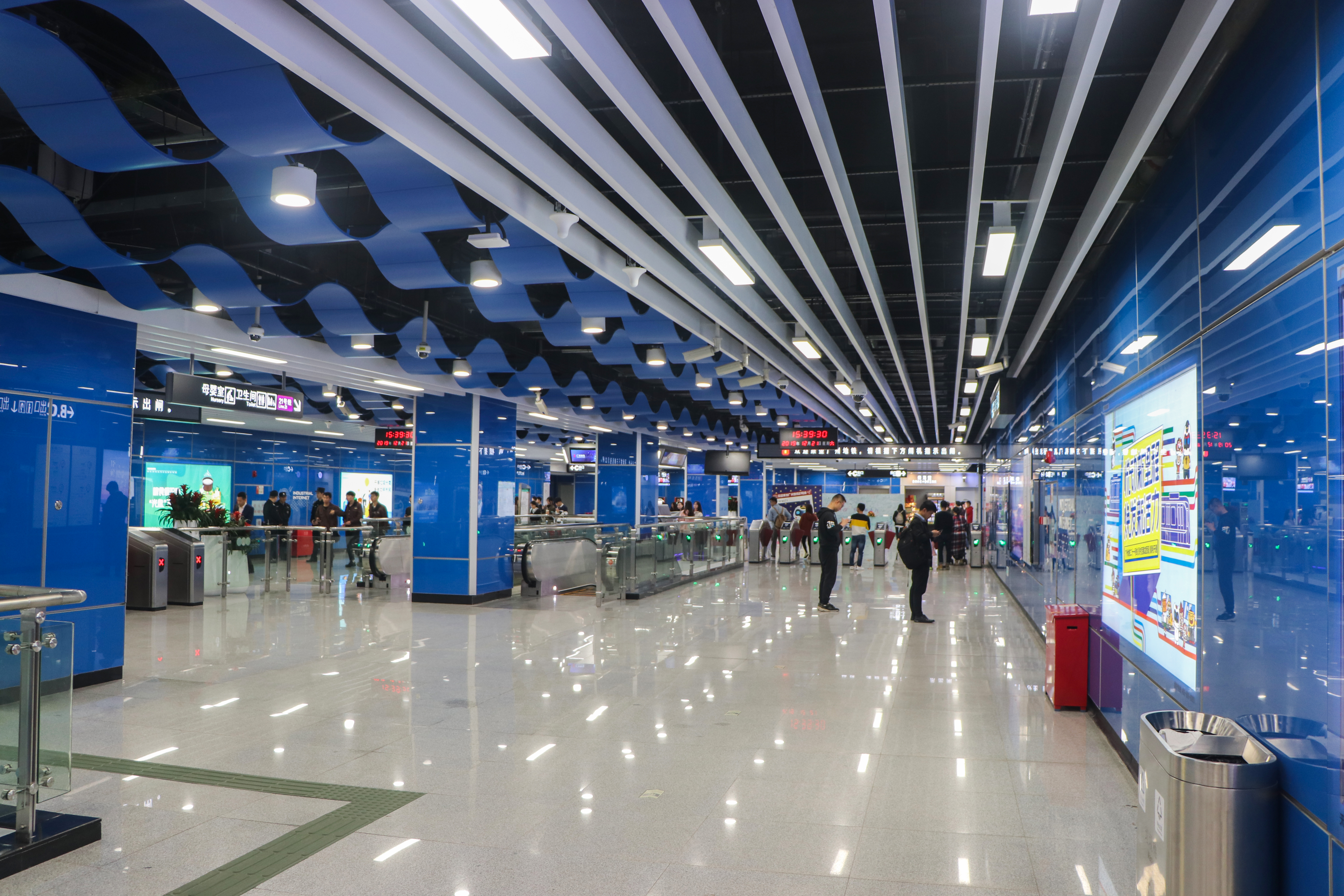
Concourse

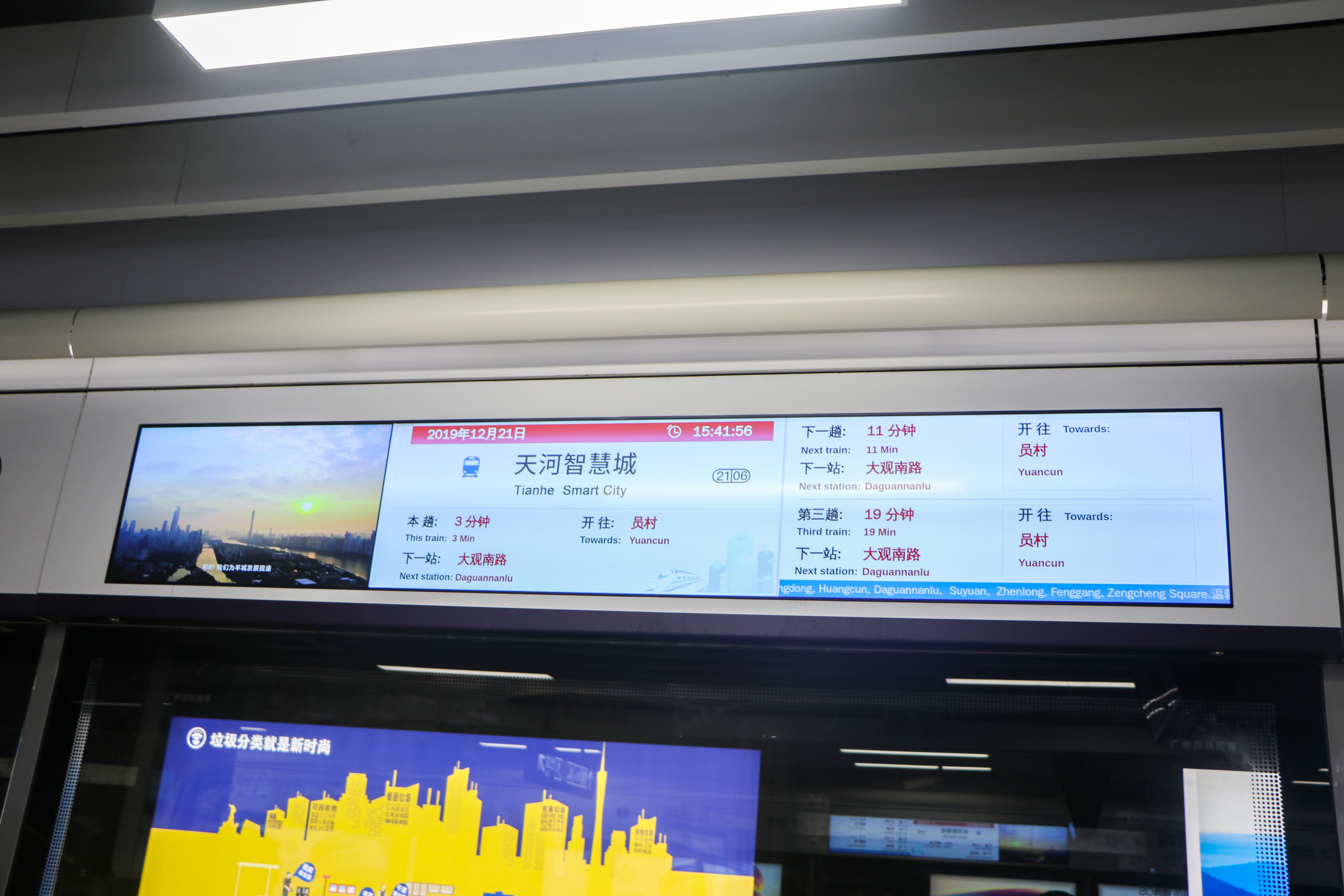
Platform 1 information display

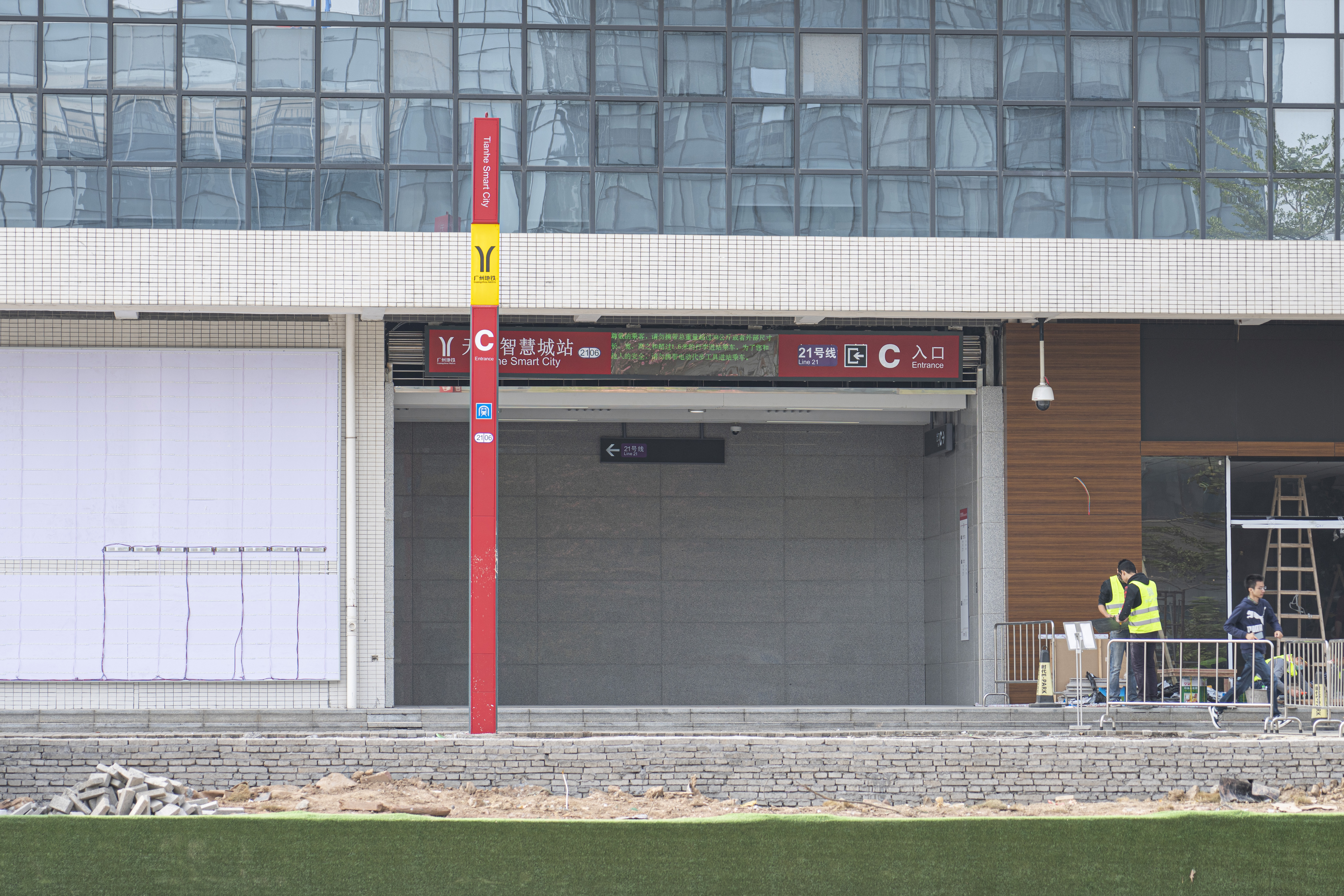
Exit C
