= The Melody and the Energetic Nature of Volume =

Studio album by Evans Blue
- Released: February 21, 2006 (U.S.); September 13, 2006 (Japan)
- Recorded: 2005
- Genre: Alternative metal; hard rock; post-grunge
- Length: 45:09
- Label: Hollywood
- Producer: Trevor Kustiak

Evans Blue chronology
The Melody and the Energetic Nature of Volume (2006)	The Pursuit Begins When This Portrayal of Life Ends (2007)

Singles from The Melody and the Energetic Nature of Volume
- 1. "Cold (But I'm Still Here)" Released: December 13, 2005; 2. "Over" Released: July 10, 2006; 3. "Beg" Released: October 18, 2006

Professional ratings
Review scores
Source	Rating
AbsolutePunk.net	(82%)
Allmusic	2.5/5 stars
Melodic	4/5 stars

The Melody and the Energetic Nature of Volume is the debut studio album by the Canadian rock band Evans Blue. It was released on February 21, 2006. The album spawned two singles, "Cold (But I'm Still Here)" and "Over." It has sold more than 200,000 copies, and was at one point #1 on the Billboard Heatseekers Chart.

The album portrays the intricate workings of a relationship and the hardships of breaking off with someone you love. "Possession" is a cover of the Sarah McLachlan song from the album, Fumbling Towards Ecstasy.

A live, acoustic version of this album, entitled Unplugged Melody, with the exception of the Sarah McLachlan cover of "Possession", was included with the purchase of the band's second album, The Pursuit Begins When This Portrayal of Life Ends. It was the first and last album to feature original drummer Darryl Brown.

== Track listing ==
All tracks are written by Kevin Matisyn and Parker Lauzon, except where noted.

No.	Title	Length
1.	"A Cross and a Girl Named Blessed"	3:52
2.	"Stop and Say You Love Me"	3:02
3.	"Cold (But I'm Still Here)"	3:53
4.	"Eclipsed"	4:23
5.	"Beg"	3:47
6.	"Over"	3:37
7.	"Possession" (Sarah McLachlan)	3:32
8.	"Dark That Follows"	5:28
9.	"The Promise and the Threat"	4:33
10.	"Quote"	5:03
11.	"The Tease"	3:59
Total length:		45:09

Japanese bonus track
No.	Title	Length
12.	"Blackhole"	3:31
Total length:		48:40

== Personnel ==
Evans Blue

- Kevin Matisyn - lead vocals
- Parker Lauzon - Rhythm guitar
- Vlad Tanaskovic - Lead guitar
- Joe Pitter - Bass
- Darryl Brown - Drums

Additional musicians

- Stuart Cameron - Acoustic guitar on Beg. Lap steel on Beg and Cold (But I'm Still Here).
- Kevin Fox - Cello on Over, Possession and Stop and Say You'll Love Me.
- Michael Langford - All percussion
- Benita Lutz - Backing vocals on Beg.
- Tara MacLean - Backing vocals on Beg and Possession.
- Sam Taylor - Keyboards on Eclipsed.

Production

- Produced by Trevor Kustiak
- Engineered by Michael Langford
- Mixed by Mark Makoway
- Mastered by Joao Carvalho at Joao Carvalho Mastering
- Recorded at The Pocket Studios
