= The Pursuit Begins When This Portrayal of Life Ends =

2007 album

Studio album by Evans Blue
- Released: July 24, 2007
- Recorded: January – April, 2007
- Studio: The Pocket Studios, Toronto
- Genre: Alternative rock; alternative metal; hard rock; post-grunge
- Length: 51:30
- Label: Hollywood
- Producer: Trevor Kustiak

Evans Blue chronology
The Melody and the Energetic Nature of Volume (2006)	The Pursuit Begins When This Portrayal of Life Ends (2007)	Evans Blue (2009)

Singles from The Pursuit Begins When This Portrayal of Life Ends
- 1. "The Pursuit" Released: May 21, 2007; 2. "Shine Your Cadillac" Released: December 17, 2007

Professional ratings
Review scores
Source	Rating
Rockfreaks	7/10

The Pursuit Begins When This Portrayal of Life Ends, commonly referred to as The Pursuit, is the second studio album by Canadian rock band Evans Blue, released on July 24, 2007. The album was leaked onto the internet on May 23, 2007, two months before its official release.

It's the band's first album to feature Howard Davis on drums and the last album with Kevin Matisyn as the lead singer of the group, before current lead singer, Dan Chandler, replaced him. The Pursuit has a heavier tone overall compared to the band's debut album.

The album sold over 30,000 copies in its first three weeks on-sale.

== Track listing ==
No.	Title	Length
1.	"In a Red Dress and Alone"	3:09
2.	"Shine Your Cadillac"	3:45
3.	"Q (The Best One of Our Lives)"	3:57
4.	"Kiss the Flag"	4:31
5.	"My Damsel: A Confession to an Adversary"	5:42
6.	"Pin-Up"	4:53
7.	"Caught a Lite Sneeze" (Tori Amos cover)	4:06
8.	"Fear"	3:58
9.	"Dear Lucid, Our Time Is Right Now"	3:46
10.	"Painted"	9:19
11.	"The Pursuit"	4:26

Bonus tracks
No.	Title	Length
1.	"Kiss the Flag" (Acoustic version) (FYE exclusive)	4:06
2.	"She Fell" (FYE exclusive)	3:29
3.	"The Pursuit" (Acoustic version) (The Pursuit CDS)	3:54

== Unplugged Melody ==
The Unplugged Melody was included with the Canadian release of the album, containing acoustic versions of songs from The Melody and the Energetic Nature of Volume, with the exception of the Sarah McLachlan cover, "Possession". For a limited time, this DVD was included with each purchase of The Pursuit Begins When This Portrayal of Life Ends from Best Buy, and contains commentary from lead singer, Matisyn, as well as a making-of documentary for the second album.

== Album credits ==
All songs written by K. Clarkson (Matisyn) / J. Lauzon / V. Tanaskovic except "Caught A Lite Sneeze," which was written by Tori Amos.

Band

- Kevin Matisyn – lead vocals
- Parker Lauzon – rhythm guitar
- Vlad Tanaskovic – lead guitar
- Joe Pitter – bass
- Howard Davis – drums

Additional musicians

- Michael Langford – percussion, engineer
- Kevin Fox – cello ("Pin-Up", "Painted")
- Konrad Kustiak – piano ("Pin-Up", "Painted")

Production

- Trevor Kustiak – producer
- Mark Makowy – mixing
- Michael Langford – engineer, digital editing
- Tom Bender – assistant
- William Paden HENSLEY – digital editing, mixing assistant
- P.R. Brown – design, photography
- Bob Vosgien – mastering
- Geoffrey Weiss – A&R
- Michael Barbiero – mixing
- Michael Brauer – mixing
- Mick Guzauski – mixing
