= Grand World Scenic Park =

Former amusement park in China

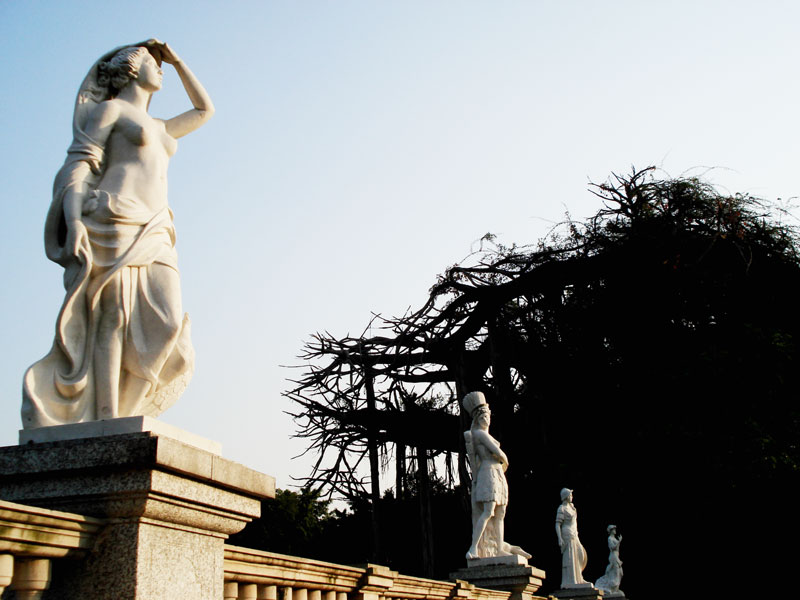
- Statues in Grand World Scenic Park
- Interactive map of Grand World Scenic Park
- Location: Guangzhou, Guangdong, China
- Coordinates: 23.148716°N 113.419697°E
- Status: Defunct
- Opened: 1995

Grand World Scenic Park (simplified Chinese: 世界大观; traditional Chinese: 世界大觀) is a former amusement park located at Dongpu, Tianhe District on the outskirts of Guangzhou, Guangdong, China.

== Description ==
The park covers a total area of 710,000 square meters. The total investment in the park is about 56.7 million yuan. The park features replicas of global landmarks.

== Closure ==
A few years after opening, visitor numbers declined and the park got into financial trouble. As of 2017, the park is rented by a wedding photography business, with most of the attractions being in disrepair.

== Worker relations ==
Since 2005 four fights have been reported by Guangzhou police between the amusement park and Yongshida workers. The disputes involve contracts, power supplies, and dormitories. On April 7, 2009, 40 men rampaged through the park destroying equipment and attacking workers with fishing forks, sticks, knives, iron bars and guns. Six security guards were hurt, including one who was shot. Police arrested 13 people in connection with the attack and seized 16 suspects in Guangdong province.

== Current situation ==
After a long period of land abandonment that aroused public attention, in 2022, the park operator finally reached an agreement with the government, and the land was taken back by the government and the land use planning was rearranged.

== See also ==
- Window of the World
- Daguannanlu station
