= The Pursuit (song) =

Single by Evans Blue

from the album The Pursuit Begins When This Portrayal of Life Ends
- Released: May 21, 2007
- Recorded: March 2007
- Genre: Hard rock
- Length: 4:25
- Label: Hollywood
- Songwriters: Kevin James Clarkson, Joseph Daniel Lauzon, Vladimir Tanaksovic
- Producer: Trevor Kustiak

Evans Blue singles chronology
"Beg" (2006)	"The Pursuit" (2007)	"Shine Your Cadillac" (2007)

Alternative cover
- Promotional single cover

Music video
- "The Pursuit" on YouTube

"The Pursuit" is a song by Canadian rock band Evans Blue. It was released on 21 May 2007, as the first single from the band's second album, The Pursuit Begins When This Portrayal of Life Ends. It was accompanied by a music video, directed by Jesse Ewles. The song peaked at #32 on US Modern Rock and #17 on US Mainstream Rock. It was released on iTunes on July 10, 2007.

== Track listing ==
Digital single
No.	Title	Writer(s)	Length
1.	"The Pursuit"	Kevin James Clarkson, Joseph Daniel Lauzon, Vladimir Tanaksovic	4:25

== Charts ==
Chart (2007)	Peak position
US Mainstream Rock Tracks	17
US Modern Rock Tracks	32
