= Grand World Phú Quốc =

Water channel in Phú Quốc, Vietnam

Coordinates: 10°19′32″N 103°51′29″E

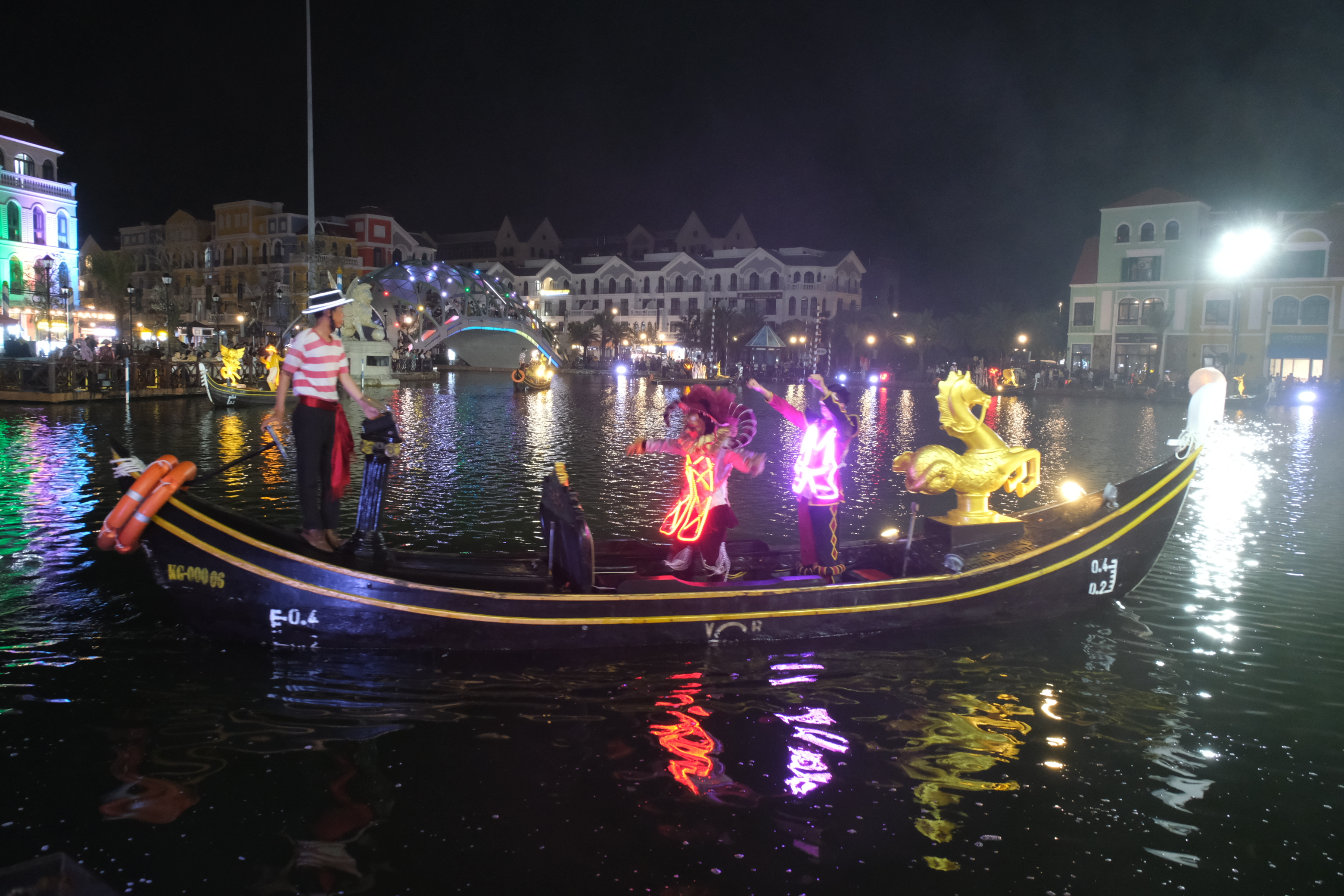
Water show

The Grand World Phú Quốc is a theme park in Phú Quốc, Vietnam. Vingroup opened in northern Phú Quốc on April 21, 2021. There are gondolas along the riverbank in the 400m-long artificial canal.. A casino, resort, and night market are located together, and a water show is held every day.
