= Grand World =

Studio album by Cool for August
- Released: April 8, 1997
- Genre: Alternative rock
- Length: 61:49
- Label: Warner Bros.
- Producer: Matt Serletic

Cool for August chronology
MilkinSorgin (1997)	Grand World (1997)	Don't Wanna Be Here (1997)

Professional ratings
Review scores
Source	Rating
AllMusic	2/5 stars

Grand World is the debut and only full-length album released by the band Cool for August. Released in 1997, it spawned three rock radio singles, and two videos (for "Don't Wanna Be Here", and "Walk Away").

The track "Big Night" is a cover of American Music Club's song from their 1987 album Engine. Cool for August's version features guest vocals from American Music Club's Mark Eitzel, and pedal steel from AMC's Bruce Kaphan.

== Track listing ==
1. "Don't Wanna Be Here" – 3:50
2. "Hope I'm Wrong" – 4:07
3. "Walk Away" – 4:02
4. "On & On" – 3:15
5. "Trials" – 4:25
6. "Big Night" – 4:19
7. "Of You" – 3:52
8. "Denial" – 3:54
9. "Sylmar" – 3:03
10. "Hey You" – 4:33
11. "Wheels" – 4:04
12. "New Song" – 18:25
  - Contains the hidden track "Spinning"

== Charts ==
Chart (1997)	Peak position
Australian Albums (ARIA Charts)	78
