= Parabelle =

Canadian rock band

- Origin: Toronto, Ontario, Canada
- Genres: Alternative rock, alternative metal, post-grunge
- Years active: 2007–present
- Label: Independent
- Members: Kevin Matisyn; Kyle Mathis; Chip Stewart
- Past members: Aaron Burton; Blaine Porpiglia; Tim Huskinson; Miles Stelzig; Chris Giovenco; Kenneth Nixon

Parabelle ('para' meaning 'to resemble; 'belle' meaning 'beauty' in French) is a Canadian rock band that initially formed in 2007 as a side project by Kevin Matisyn, the former lead singer of Evans Blue, and Kenneth Nixon of Framing Hanley. Following Kevin Matisyn's departure from Evans Blue in 2008, Parabelle was formed into a full band and has undergone numerous line-up changes since then. The band's first release was a double album entitled A Summit Borderline/A Drop Oceanic on July 6, 2009. With the subsequent addition of Kyle Mathis (formerly of Neverset) and Aaron Burton, they released their second album Reassembling the Icons on November 15, 2010. An acoustic album, These Electric Pages Have Been Unplugged, featuring studio acoustic tracks, was released on May 24, 2011. The band released a third studio album,Your Starry Eyes Will Never Make Us Even, on August 21, 2012. The band released a fourth and fifth studio album, The Kill Plan in 2016 and The Rose Avail in 2019.

The band was originally formed in the Toronto area, but is now based in Dallas, Texas.

== History ==
=== 2007–2008: Early years ===
The band's first incarnation came in 2007 when Kevin Matisyn and Kenneth Nixon began playing acoustic shows together under the name Parabelle.

Later in 2008, Kenneth Nixon left Parabelle to focus exclusively on Framing Hanley. Tim Huskinson left Framing Hanley due to back problems and joined Parabelle full-time.

=== 2009: A Summit Borderline/A Drop Oceanic ===
The band, no longer a side-project, announced that an album would be released in the spring or the summer of 2009.

Their debut album, A Summit Borderline/A Drop Oceanic, was released on July 6, 2009. It is a double album. The first disc is titled "A Summit Borderline," whereas the second is titled "A Drop Oceanic." The artwork for the album was a joint effort by frontman Kevin Matisyn and Julia Royal of Julia Royal's Team Vanity.

Near the end of 2009, Parabelle added drummer Joe Maurer and guitarist Kyle Mathis to the line-up when their band Neverset parted ways. Parabelle had opened for Neverset during their "Hooker and Hand Grenades" tour before their breakup.

=== 2010–2011: Reassembling the Icons and These Electric Pages Have Been Unplugged ===
In 2010, Parabelle began recording a new record. Kevin Matisyn announced that it would be produced by Mike Langford, who engineered the first two Evans Blue albums. When asked about the sound of the album, Matisyn commented, "I think it's similar, that moody kinda style, that's definitely what we are going for with this new record. I wanted to do a darker record musically, but a little more positive lyrically."

The band debuted the first song from the album, "More", on Alternative Addiction in April 2010. "More" peaked as the number 2 song on Alternative Addiction's Top 20 Chart.

On November 3, 2010, Parabelle premiered the music video for "Kiss the Flag: The Widow." It was stated in the video's description that the new album, Reassembling the Icons, would be available on November 16. Although, it ended up being released a day early on November 15 instead.

On November 11, the band released another song from their new album titled "Reassembling the Icons".

On November 15, the album was released via iTunes and Amazon. Reassembling the Icons debuted at No. 8 on iTunes Top 100 Rock Albums.

On April 14, the band released a YouTube video of the single "Us (Walk Away)" from their acoustic album, These Electric Pages Have Been Unplugged.

On April 22, Parabelle released the track list for the album via Facebook. The album was released on May 24, 2011.The album artwork was designed by Will Schaule influenced by Kevin Matisyn.

On October 3, 2011, Parabelle released a new stand-alone single titled "This Life".

=== 2012–2014: Your Starry Eyes Will Never Make Us Even and Air ===
"Let It Out" was released July 15, 2012 as the lead single to Your Starry Eyes Will Never Make Us Even, the band's third studio album. The album was partially funded using crowd funding website Kickstarter. The album itself was released on August 21, 2012.

Beginning in early 2012, the band began playing several shows with Evans Blue's former drummer Howard Davis.

In January 2013, a compilation album and DVD, Air, was announced, and later released on April 16, 2013. It includes five new tracks, and studio recorded acoustic versions of five songs from Your Starry Eyes Will Never Make Us Even and one song from A Summit Borderline.

In July 2014, the band announced on Facebook that they had already recorded demos for their next album The Kill Plan, and that the album would start recording once funding for the album has been secured.

=== 2015–2016: The Kill Plan ===
On September 22, 2015, the band released the first single "Remarkable Lies (Your Cover's Blown)". On September 29, 2015, they released the second single "The Kill Plan", and announced an independent crowd funding website. The band decided on not using Kickstarter for this album, citing losing a cut of the funding to Kickstarter as the primary reason. Along with a physical preorder of the album, multiple packages were made available with merchandise exclusive to the campaign. On October 16, the $15,000 goal was reached, and on November 19 the campaign concluded with all three stretch goals met.

The band released their fourth studio album, The Kill Plan on November 5, 2016.

=== 2017–2019: The Rose Avail ===
On May 21, 2019, the band released their fifth studio album, The Rose Avail.

== Members ==
Current:

- Kevin Matisyn – lead vocals (2008–present)
- Kyle Mathis – rhythm guitar, backing vocals (2009–present)
- Chip Stewart – lead guitar (2018–present)
- Justin Baisden – bass guitar (2018–present); touring musician (2015–2018)
- Mike Langford – drums (2019–present)

Previous:

- Blaine Porpiglia – drums (2009)
- Tim Huskinson – rhythm and lead guitar (2008–2009)
- Miles Stelzig – lead and rhythm guitar (2008–2009)
- Chris "Gio" Giovenco – bass guitar (2008–2012)
- Aaron Burton – lead guitar (2009–2017)
- Jordan Hatfield - drums (2009–2012)

Touring musicians:

- Alex Rodriguez – drums (2013–2015)
- Howard Davis – drums (2012–2013, 2015–2018)

== Discography ==
=== Albums ===
- A Summit Borderline/A Drop Oceanic (2009)
- Reassembling the Icons (2010)
- These Electric Pages Have Been Unplugged (2011)
- Your Starry Eyes Will Never Make Us Even (2012)
- Air (2013)
- The Kill Plan (2016)
- A Summit Borderline (Remastered) (2016)
- State By State EP, Vol. 1 (2016)
- The Rose Avail (2019)
