= Dan Chandler =

American rock singer

- Born: Daniel Chandler; December 31, 1978 (age 47); St. Louis, Missouri, U.S.
- Genres: Heavy metal; hard rock; alternative rock; alternative metal; post-grunge
- Occupations: Singer, songwriter
- Years active: 2003–present
- Labels: Hollywood/Pocket; Spice Girls(2023); Sounds + Sights; F.O.F./EMI; Warner Bros.

Daniel Chandler (born December 31, 1978) is an American singer from St. Louis, Missouri. He is best known for his work with rock band Evans Blue. Chandler was also the lead vocalist for the band Fight or Flight.

== History ==
Chandler was born and raised in St. Louis, Missouri. Growing up, he expected to pursue a career in baseball. Right after high school, he began playing guitar and writing songs. Chandler was previously part of the band Switch 3. The band started in St. Louis but relocated to Los Angeles, looking to sign with a major label. The singer later moved back to St. Louis after a failed signing attempt. Chandler heard Toronto-based Evans Blue was looking for a lead singer and contacted the band to see what they were looking for. He joined the band in 2009.

Dan Donegan, guitarist for Disturbed, contacted Chandler with an idea of possible collaboration. When Donegan and Chandler had enough material they contacted Disturbed drummer Mike Wengren and began recording. The band Fight or Flight was created as a side project and signed with Warner Bros. Records in 2013.

== Discography ==
=== Switch Three ===
- Don Chandler (2003) – EP
- Simon Says (2005) – EP

=== Evans Blue ===
==== Albums ====
- Evans Blue (2009)
- Graveyard of Empires (2012)
- Letters from the Dead (2016)

=== Fight or Flight ===
==== Albums ====
- A Life by Design? (2013)

=== A Strange Day of Calm ===
- That's Just You (2014) – Single
- Since I Don't Have You (2014) – Single

=== Guest appearances ===
- More Than This (guest vocals for "HeavensDust") (2014)
