= Evans Blue =

Canadian rock band

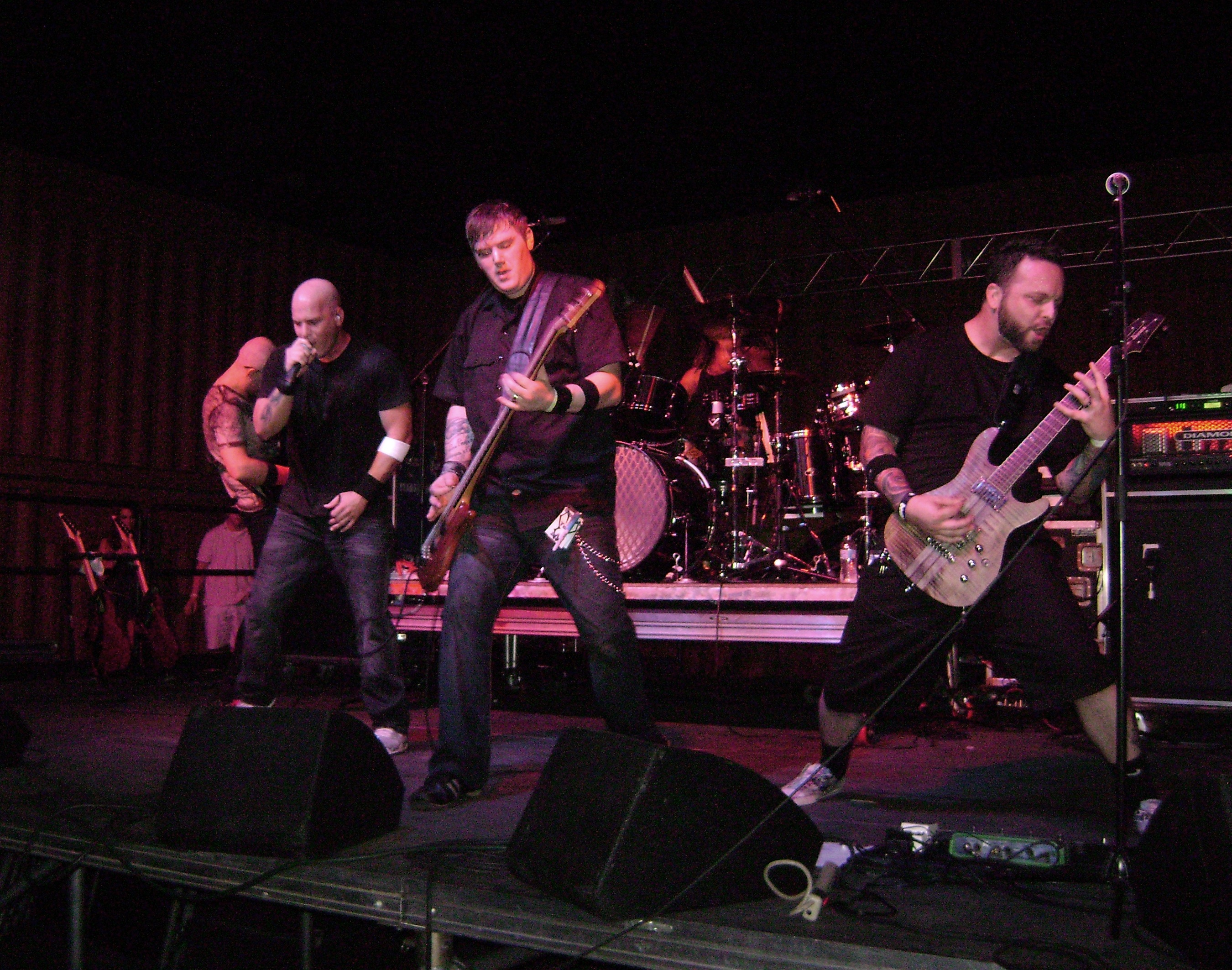
- Evans Blue performing in 2011

Background information
- Origin: Toronto, Ontario, Canada
- Genres: Alternative metal; post-grunge; hard rock
- Years active: 2005–2016; 2025–present
- Labels: Hollywood; Pocket; Sounds+Sights; F.O.F.; EMI
- Members: Parker Lauzon; Joe Pitter; Dan Chandler; Vlad Tanaskovic
- Past members: Darryl Brown; Kevin Matisyn; Howard Davis; Kevin Smith; Danny D; Mike McClure; Jason Pierce
- Website: evansblue.com

Evans Blue is a Canadian alternative metal band from Toronto, founded in 2005. They have sold over one million albums worldwide, including five studio albums and one live album.

== History ==
=== Origins (2005) ===
Evans Blue came together in early 2005. Five musicians, then in three separate bands, met through a local musician's message board. Lead singer Kevin Matisyn suggested the name, which refers to the dye that is injected into the bloodstream to measure blood volume. The band then caught the attention of producer Trevor Kustiak (Cool for August) and his partner Mari Dew, of The Pocket Studios. The original lead guitarist, Kevin Smith, left for personal reasons before the group secured a record label.

They recorded three demo songs: "Black Hole", "Saturnalia" and "Starlight", all of which would appear on their first album.

=== The Melody and the Energetic Nature of Volume (2005–2007) ===
Evans Blue completed work on their debut album, The Melody and the Energetic Nature of Volume, in November 2005. Their first single, "Cold (But I'm Still Here)" hit airwaves in December and was accompanied by a video. The album was released February 21, 2006, through The Pocket Recordings/Hollywood Records. It debuted at No. 1 on the Billboard Top Heatseekers chart, spent several weeks in the top 10 list and spawned a second single, "Over".

In March 2006, Evans Blue embarked upon their first U.S. tour alongside Taproot. They also played festivals, and several concerts with Breaking Benjamin. They have since played with bands such as Staind, Alice in Chains, 10 Years, Three Days Grace, Flyleaf and former labelmates Breaking Benjamin.

On April 1, 2006, drummer Darryl Brown left due to differences with bandmates' lifestyles. That night in Boston, drummer Danny D (formerly of the band Dogfight) was temporarily brought in. The band played acoustic sets until he was up to speed, and he continued through the rest of the tour, which lasted until late October.

=== The Pursuit Begins When This Portrayal of Life Ends (2007–2009) ===
After an eight-month stint touring around the United States, Evans Blue returned home and began work upon their second album, The Pursuit Begins When This Portrayal of Life Ends. Danny D left the band and was replaced by Howard Davis. Davis had originally auditioned to become the drummer for the band Breaking Benjamin, he was not picked however due to the band choosing another drummer first, but Davis kept in contact with the band and they referred him to Evan’s Blue when the drummer position opened.

Evans Blue was nominated for New Group of the Year at the Juno Awards of 2007.

The first single from The Pursuit hit airwaves May 21, 2007, and was accompanied by a music video, directed by Jesse Ewles. The Pursuit Begins When This Portrayal of Life Ends was released on July 24, 2007.

In March 2007, Evans Blue recorded acoustic versions of each song from The Melody and the Energetic Nature of Volume. For a limited time, this collection was included with each purchase of The Pursuit from Best Buy, and contained commentary from Matisyn, as well as a making-of documentary for the second album. The FYE version of the album did not include the Unplugged Melody, but instead had two additional tracks.

On July 10, 2007, in Toronto, Evans Blue kicked off their first headlining tour, Curbside Confession of a Catastrophe. The tour stopped across the western United States, with occasional performances in Vancouver, British Columbia. They were accompanied by Framing Hanley, Fair to Midland, and Submersed throughout September, then were joined by Saving Abel and Canadian rockers Neurosonic. This tour ended on December 31 in Houston, Texas, where they introduced a new song, "Good Enough", a song which was later scrapped.

Matisyn was subsequently fired from the band. Lauzon stated that Matisyn was removed "not only because of musical differences but business differences as well. He was not making good decisions for this band anymore, and we as a group have decided to move on." Matisyn went on to found the band Parabelle.

=== Evans Blue (2009–2010) ===
Dan Chandler was announced as the new singer for Evans Blue in February 2009, and the band went into the studio with producer Trevor Kustiak to record their third album. The self-titled album was released through Sounds+Sights, exclusively via iTunes, on June 23, 2009.

The first song from the new album "Sick of It" was released on iTunes on March 31. The song went to No. 1 in the research at SiriusXM Octane and was No. 2 on the 2009 year-end Octane chart. Based on this success, SiriusXM Octane added a second track, "Bulletproof," in October 2009.

In May 2010, Evans Blue and Sounds+Sights teamed up with indie label F.O.F. Entertainment/EMI for a physical release of their 2009 Evans Blue record in stores throughout the U.S. and Canada. The album was released on July 27, 2010, and included the bonus track "Erase My Scars," which was chosen as the new single.

"Erase My Scars" hit the U.S. airwaves in May 2010, and the band hit the road in early July 2010 for the first leg of their Erase My Scars 2010 Tour with Kansas City band Red Line Chemistry, covering 10,000 miles in 6 weeks. Evans Blue stopped in Los Angeles mid-tour to shoot the video for "Erase My Scars" with director Adrian Picardi and producer Eric Ro of Northern Five Entertainment. (The video is dedicated to Dan Chandler's nephew Chase Franklin, who died of a rare brain cancer at age 8.) In November, the band went on the second leg of the tour, this time with Oklahoma natives Taddy Porter and EB's Sounds+Sights label mates Rains.

=== Graveyard of Empires (2011–2012) ===
On the Erase My Scars tour, Evans Blue debuted songs from their next album Graveyard of Empires. The band began recording the album in September 2011. On September 28, 2012, "This Time It's Different" made its worldwide debut on Sirius Radio. The album was released on April 17, 2012; it peaked at No. 40 on the Billboard 200.

On November 8, 2011, Evans Blue announced, via Facebook, that drummer Howard "H-Bomb" Davis had left the band, posting "Musically, we were moving in different directions, so this is the best for everyone, and we wish him all the best." The departure was clearly amicable, with Davis posting "This change is for the best...There is no beef with any of the members of EB." The band brought in session drummers Mike McClure and Jason Pierce (Our Lady Peace), both for recording and touring; Davis is not credited on Graveyard of Empires.

On December 9, 2012, Evans Blue debuted the song "Halo" on Revolver Magazine's website; the next day, it was released on iTunes and other sites (the lyric video for the song had been released in July). "This Time It's Different" was a Top 30 rock radio hit nationally and a number-one song on SiriusXM Octane, The Buzz in Houston, 89X in Detroit and The Banana in Flint, as well as Top 5 on KUPD Phoenix. The song also debuted in the Top 25 Rock Singles on iTunes. "Halo" and "Beyond The Stars" also went on to be number-one songs on the SiriusXM Octane BIG UNS COUNTDOWN, and "Warrior" climbed to No. 3. "Halo" was also No. 9 on the Octane 2012 Year-End Countdown and No. 18 on the 89X Detroit 2012 Year-End Countdown, and "This Time It's Different" was No. 12 on The Buzz Houston's 2012 Year-End Countdown and No. 13 on Octane.

Evans Blue toured throughout the summer of 2012 in support of Graveyard of Empires this time with Columbus, Ohio-based band State Your Cause. The first show took place on July 6 at The Machine Shop in Flint, Michigan, where the band took the opportunity to shoot a new live video for "Halo".

=== Hiatus and Letters From the Dead (2012–2025) ===
In an interview, Chandler stated that Evans Blue would be taking a break, due to the fact that Parker Lauzon and Vlad Tanaskovic were becoming fathers. Chandler joined a side project named Fight or Flight with Disturbed members Dan Donegan and Mike Wengren. He also started a hip-hop project called A Strange Day of Calm, and a band called Switchthree.

In August 2015, Evans Blue began recording their fifth album, Letters from the Dead. The first single, "iGod", was released on January 8, 2016; with the album's release following shortly thereafter.

The band had no true activity in the following decade, with scant few messages across their social media platforms. On August 10, 2021, Chandler posted, on the Evans Blue Facebook page, that he had produced an album with his "other band", Emissary Echo. Lauzon and Pitter are listed as band members.

=== Reformation and SPEAK ===
After nearly a decade of inactivity, Evans Blue returned for a reunion show on May 15, 2025 at Welcome to Rockville. The band then made a few other appearances at other festivals over the coming months.

On October 2, 2026, Evans Blue teased a new project "Speak" for the following week, their first new music release since Letters from the Dead.

== Band members ==
Current

- Kevin Best – drums, backing vocals (2016–present)
- Joe Pitter – bass (2005–present)
- Vlad Tanaskovic – lead guitar (2005–present), backing vocals (2005–present)
- Dan Chandler – vocals (2009–present)

Session and touring

- Danny Desharnais – drums (2006)
- Mike McClure – drums (Graveyard of Empires)
- Jason Pierce – drums (Graveyard of Empires, Letters from the Dead)
- Dusty Saxton – drums, backing vocals (2012, 2016)
- Michael Langford – percussion (The Melody and Energetic Nature of Volume, The Pursuit Begins when this Portrayal of life Ends)
- Parker Lauzon - Rhythm Guitar (2005-2026)

Former

- Darryl Brown – drums (2005–2006)
- Kevin Matisyn – vocals (2005–2008)
- Howard Davis – drums (2007–2011)
- Kevin Smith – lead guitar (2005)

Timeline

== Discography ==
=== Studio albums ===
| Year | Album details | Peak chart positions | | | | | |
| Year | Album details | US | US Heat. | US Ind. | US Alt. | US Hard Rock | US Rock |
|---|---|---|---|---|---|---|---|
| 2006 | The Melody and the Energetic Nature of Volume: Released: February 21, 2006; Label: The Pocket, Hollywood; Formats: CD, DI | 106 | 1 | — | — | — | — |
| 2007 | The Pursuit Begins When This Portrayal of Life Ends: Released: July 24, 2007; Label: The Pocket, Hollywood; Formats: CD, DI | 44 | — | — | 12 | 5 | 13 |
| 2009 | Evans Blue: Released: June 23, 2009; Label: Sounds+Sights, EMI; Formats: CD, DI | — | — | 48 | — | — | — |
| 2012 | Graveyard of Empires: Released: April 17, 2012; Label: Sounds+Sights; Formats: CD, DI | 121 | — | 19 | 24 | 9 | 40 |
| 2016 | Letters from the Dead: Released: April 15, 2016; Label: Sounds+Sights; Formats: CD, DI | — | — | — | — | 23 | — |
"—" denotes a release that did not chart.

=== Singles ===
| Year | Song | Peak chart positions | | | Album |
| Year | Song | US Alt. | US Main. | US Rock | Album |
|---|---|---|---|---|---|
| 2005 | "Cold (But I'm Still Here)" | 28 | 8 | × | The Melody and the Energetic Nature of Volume |
| 2006 | "Over" | — | 28 | × | The Melody and the Energetic Nature of Volume |
| 2006 | "Beg" | — | — | × | The Melody and the Energetic Nature of Volume |
| 2007 | "The Pursuit" | 32 | 17 | × | The Pursuit Begins When This Portrayal of Life Ends |
| 2007 | "Shine Your Cadillac" | — | — | × | The Pursuit Begins When This Portrayal of Life Ends |
| 2009 | "Sick of It" | — | — | × | Evans Blue |
| 2009 | "Bulletproof" | — | — | — | Evans Blue |
| 2010 | "Erase My Scars" | — | 27 | 45 | Evans Blue |
| 2011 | "Say It" | — | — | — | Evans Blue |
| 2011 | "This Time It's Different" | — | 31 | 29 | Graveyard of Empires |
| 2011 | "Halo" | — | — | — | Graveyard of Empires |
| 2012 | "Beyond the Stars" | — | — | — | Graveyard of Empires |
| 2016 | "iGod" | — | — | — | Letters From The Dead |
| 2026 | "Speak" | — | — | — | TBA |
"—" denotes the single failed to chart, or not released. "×" denotes periods where charts did not exist or were not archived.

=== Music videos ===
| Year | Song |
|---|---|
| 2005 | "Cold (But I'm Still Here)" |
| 2007 | "The Pursuit" |
| 2010 | "Bulletproof" |
| 2010 | "Erase My Scars" |
| 2011 | "Say It" |
| 2012 | "Halo" |
| 2016 | "Dead Amen" |
| 2026 | "Speak" |

== DVDs ==
- The Unplugged Melody (2007)
