= Kevin Matisyn =

American singer

- Also known as: Kevin James Clarkson
- Born: September 19, 1979 (age 46)
- Genres: Alternative rock; alternative metal; hard rock; post-grunge
- Occupations: Singer, songwriter

Kevin Matisyn (born September 19, 1979) is a Canadian born singer. He is the lead singer for the rock band Parabelle and formerly was the vocalist for Evans Blue.

== Biography ==
Matisyn started listening to Metallica in his early teens and began his first band while at the age of sixteen. In March 2005, he co-founded the band, Evans Blue, which spawned two albums, The Melody and the Energetic Nature of Volume and The Pursuit Begins When This Portrayal of Life Ends. There is also a bootleg Evans Blue collection entitled The Stage is Set for the Revival of Anthem that consists of a number of unreleased demos and an unofficial acoustic compilation entitled The Unplugged Melody.

As of July 28, 2008, he was no longer in the band. He published a post on his MySpace page saying he is "Formerly of Evans Blue". This was confirmed by Evans Blue on their MySpace page.

In 2007, Matisyn formed the band Parabelle. The band has released five albums, A Summit Borderline/A Drop Oceanic (a double album), Reassembling the Icons, Your Starry Eyes Will Never Make Us Even, The Kill Plan, and The Rose Avail. Matisyn and Parabelle have also released two acoustic compilations, These Electric Pages Have Been Unplugged and Air.

In 2013, Matisyn announced that his solo album Alice-Ofelia-Kira was to be released sometime in 2013. This album was released digitally January 7, 2014. The album's physical release was set for February 11, 2014.

== Discography ==
=== Solo ===
- Alice-Ofelia-Kira (2014)

=== Evans Blue ===
- The Melody and the Energetic Nature of Volume (2006)
- The Pursuit Begins When This Portrayal of Life Ends (2007)
- The Unplugged Melody (2007)
- The Stage is Set for the Revival of an Anthem (Unreleased)

=== Parabelle ===
- A Summit Borderline/A Drop Oceanic (2009)
- Reassembling the Icons (2010)
- These Electric Pages Have Been Unplugged (2011)
- Your Starry Eyes Will Never Make Us Even (2012)
- Air (2013)
- The Kill Plan (2016)
- A Summit Borderline (Remastered) (2016)
- State By State EP, Vol. 1 (2016)
- The Rose Avail (2019)
