= Indestructible (Disturbed album) =

- The cover of Indestructible featuring The Guy, Disturbed's mascot, illustrated by David Finch

Studio album by Disturbed
- Released: June 3, 2008
- Recorded: October 25 – December 7, 2007
- Studio: Groovemaster Studios in Chicago, Illinois
- Genre: Heavy metal; alternative metal; hard rock
- Length: 49:09
- Label: Reprise
- Producer: Dan Donegan

Disturbed chronology
Ten Thousand Fists (2005)	Indestructible (2008)	Live & Indestructible (2008)

Singles from Indestructible
- 1. "Inside the Fire" Released: March 25, 2008; 2. "Perfect Insanity" Released: May 6, 2008; 3. "Indestructible" Released: September 29, 2008; 4. "The Night" Released: March 31, 2009

Indestructible is the fourth studio album by American heavy metal band Disturbed. A self-produced effort, Indestructible is the first Disturbed album that did not feature Johnny K, the producer of Disturbed's previous three albums, The Sickness, Believe, and Ten Thousand Fists. Indestructible was recorded at Groovemaster Studios in Chicago, Illinois. The album features two songs, "Perfect Insanity" and "Divide", that were written by Disturbed prior to their first album, The Sickness, but were never previously released.

The album shows Disturbed abandoning the nu metal sound prominent on their previous three albums and features significantly darker themes than any of their previous work, according to the band. Some of the lyrical themes involve actual experiences that vocalist David Draiman had endured over the course of the past few years prior to making the album, including "bad relationships", a motorcycle accident that he was involved with, and an incident of suicide. To match the aggressive attitude and nature of said themes, Draiman told the other band members to create darker, more textural music than they have before. Despite these themes, the title track, "Indestructible", is meant to encourage those in the military that are fighting in wars and boost their morale.

Indestructible was released on June 3, 2008 in CD format, and also as two different limited edition and special edition digipaks, debuting at number one on the Billboard 200, making it the third consecutive number one debut by Disturbed on that chart, which had only been achieved by five other rock bands prior to the album's release. The album also shipped over 253,000 units in its opening week. Indestructible was met with mixed reviews by critics, earning a score of 57% on review-aggregating website Metacritic, based on six reviews. The album was certified 2× Platinum by the Recording Industry Association of America in March 2025 for shipping over 2,000,000 copies in the United States. The single "Inside the Fire" was nominated for a 2009 Grammy Award in the "Best Hard Rock Performance" category.

== Recording and production ==
After touring in support of the band's previous album, Ten Thousand Fists, the band took a break. During this time, drummer Mike Wengren got married, and guitarist Dan Donegan had a child. In February 2007, after the break was over, the band went to Groovemaster Studios in Chicago, Illinois and began writing music. Indestructible is Disturbed's first self-produced effort, without Johnny K acting as producer, as he did on the band's previous albums, The Sickness, Believe, and Ten Thousand Fists. The band was comfortable with self-producing, despite having Johnny K produce two consecutive number-one albums, and this being their first time without him. As vocalist David Draiman reasoned, "we learned it, and we'd like to try [self-producing]."

Early in the writing process, Donegan created guitar riffs. The rest of the band then listened to the riffs, and wrote the rest of the music, with the riffs being the base. As Donegan commented, "The writing process is ... pretty much the same since the beginning ... of this band. It's always been riffs; something musically that I'll come up with [that begins the writing process]." Wengren commented, "We're always tossing around riffs and beats, but it isn't really until we get home and we are able to clear our minds, decompress for a little bit, and then hit it, especially Danny and I, and just start throwing the riffs and the beats out, that the music starts to finally come to life." Bassist John Moyer left the studio during the recording process, due to his wife being pregnant. Donegan and Wengren sent him demos through e-mail, and he continued to write bass lines for the songs from his home studio. Regarding electronics on the album, Donegan said, "When the basic guitar, bass, [and] drums were being laid down, at first I didn't really see a whole lot of room for some of the electronics, but as the songs were starting to develop, I was just in that frame of mind to try and toy around with some of the electronics."

When the instrumentation was completed, Draiman began to write melody lines for each song. Draiman commented, "I'm a big believer in the vibe of the music and the feel of it, how the song makes you feel musically should dictate what it is to be about and so if you start with something that has meaning, but the music doesn't support the meaning, then what good is it?" The first song completed musically was "The Night", and Draiman completed the melody line in three days. This caused Draiman to tentatively call the record The Night. As Draiman recalled, "The instrumentation was so cool and so dark and textural that I right away kind of jumped into it." When the first batch of songs were completed, the band sent them out to their record label, Reprise Records, and waited for their approval to continue writing more songs. After they received approval, they wrote the rest of the songs featured on the album.

Disturbed "Divide" (1990s/2008)
Comparison of the 2008 Indestructible recording of the song "Divide", and the demo version from early in Disturbed's career, respectively.

Wengren commented, "We thought it would be pretty cool, especially for the fans, if we brought back maybe a song or two, that were actually written during the same period that The Sickness songs were written. Danny brought in some old demo tapes, I'm talking twelve years old, back when 'Down With the Sickness' and 'Stupify' [sic], and all that stuff was written, this was actually written before that." The songs that Wengren was referring to were "Perfect Insanity", and "Divide". The band also recorded a version of the song "Midlife Crisis", which was originally performed by Faith No More. Draiman comments, "We took the song, revamped it and modernized it to our current level, and the version's killer." However, the song did not make it into the final track listing of the album, and is instead featured on Covered, A Revolution in Sound. This version of "Midlife Crisis" later appeared on The Lost Children, the band's first compilation album. One song, titled "Emptiness", was never fully recorded ever by the band.

== Title ==
Indestructible took the longest amount of time to title when compared to Disturbed's previous records, according to Wengren. The band had originally wanted to title the record The Night, because it was the first track to be completed, and it defined the musical direction the band wanted to use with Indestructible. The record had a song whose working title was Defend, but it eventually was re-titled "Indestructible". When the title was changed, the band felt the title had, as Donegan reasoned, "made a bigger statement". Draiman said they titled the record Indestructible because the title "... kind of symbolizes the fact that we're still fucking here, that we haven't been destroyed, that we withstood the test of time."

Regarding the choice of the title, Moyer commented, "Usually there's some name or phrase that sort of sums up, you know, what the vibe of the record's about, so this one's Indestructible, and it is an aggressive record, this record's about kicking ass." Donegan, commenting on the meaning of the title, stated, "We feel that we've become indestructible to be able to survive this long in the business, and continuing a success with it." Draiman concluded, "We have been through a lot. No matter what gets thrown at us, as a band, no matter what happens in the musical environment, we're still here, we're still viable, and still standing."

== Musical style and lyrical themes ==
Disturbed "Torn" (2008)
The incorporation of guitar solos, such as the one used in this sample of "Torn", was considered a significant expansion of Disturbed's typical sound and was generally praised by most critics.

Vocalist David Draiman states that, lyrically, the album was inspired by various occurrences of bad luck that happened to him. "I had a motorcycle accident, and I had my garage burn down with most of my vehicles," Draiman commented. "... I've had really bad relationships that I've been in and out of. They've left their mark", he concluded. The song "Indestructible" is "an anthem for soldiers", Draiman comments. "It's meant to be something that would make them feel invincible, take away their fear, make them strong and that's what this whole body of work on this record does. It's music to help you feel strong," he concludes. Cuts such as "Deceiver" and "Inside the Fire" are about "really bad relationships". "Inside the Fire" is about "standing over the body of my girlfriend, who just killed herself, and the Devil is standing over me, whispering in my ear to kill myself," says Draiman. The song "The Night" is, "just kind of meant to portray the night almost as like a living entity that sets you free. You're enveloped by it, enmasked by it," Draiman comments. The band's vocalist also says the song "Perfect Insanity" is about "toying with the idea of insanity. Coming at you from the perspective from the individual who is [insane] and warning people around him, particularly his love interests, about his psychotic tendencies." Draiman says the track "Divide" "is meant to detract from the idea 'oh, let's all be one, let's all be united!' Fuck that, be yourself, be an individual, stand out, make your mark, make an impact." Commenting on the meaning of the song "Façade", Draiman says it is, "... a song from the perspective of a girl in a relationship where she's abused ... she's thinking about killing him, like you see on the news."

To match the themes Draiman had in mind, he told his bandmates, "give me your darkest, nastiest, [most] aggressive tribal rhythmic shit you can throw at me". Prior to the release of the album, guitarist Dan Donegan supported this, stating, "musically, it's a lot ballsier than we've written [before]." He continued, saying, "[We're] trying to get a good blend of the elements of the past three CDs to try to evolve into something fresh and new for us as well." Dan Marsicano of 411mania commented on the song "Perfect Insanity", claiming it has "...a short but sweet shredding solo, double bass drum work, and fast picked riffing...". He goes on to propose the same for the song "Divide", saying it "follows the same pattern [as "Perfect Insanity"], with aggressive guitar work followed through by Draiman's vocals..." Marsicano also proposes that "Inside the Fire" has "...a memorable solo and a dark theme surrounding it," and says that "The Night" is an "epic-sounding track that has one of the best solos that Donegan has ever done and a catchy chorus." Chris Akin of Metaleater proposes that the album is full of hooks, and that guitarist Donegan takes a "much more 80s approach", due to his guitar solos. Christian Hoard of Rolling Stone proposes that the album contains "meticulously constructed guitar skronk, serrated verses and cathartic refrains".

== Promotion ==
Disturbed "Perfect Insanity" (1998/2008)
45-second sample comparing the 2008 Indestructible recording of "Perfect Insanity" and the 1998 M.O.L. version of it, respectively.

The marketing campaign for Indestructible began in late 2007, with a strategy of releasing content for fans early and often. Promotion began with distributing stickers at live events. Reprise Records also partnered with Hot Topic retailers, who thereafter put an Indestructible album teaser on all Disturbed merchandise, and eventually began selling a limited edition 7" vinyl record with two songs from the album on it. In March 2008, Disturbed performed a concert in Kuwait for the United States military stationed there. The concert was streamed live on MySpace, and more than three million people viewed it. In February 2008, an audio sample was posted on Disturbed's MySpace profile to promote Indestructible. The sample, titled "Perfect Insanity", is actually a song written early in the band's career that never previously appeared on an album, but was expected to appear on the album. The track was later made available for download, in its entirety, on Disturbed's website for promotional purposes. Another sample, titled "Inside the Fire", appeared on Rock on the Range's MySpace profile in March 2008. The track was anticipated to be the first single released from the album, with a music video directed by Nathan Cox. On March 24, 2008 "Inside the Fire" debuted on more than sixty radio stations. It was released for digital download the next day. On May 2, 2008 the music video for "Inside the Fire" debuted on Disturbed's website.

In April 2008, a limited edition pre-order digipak of Indestructible was made available for order exclusively through Disturbed's website. The limited edition package featured the entire album, a B-side track entitled "Run", a DVD featuring a documentary about the making of the album and some instructional videos, a "wrap-around" poster, a special VIP laminate which grants access to special Disturbed events through 2009, and a special code which grants access to the "Inside the Fire" special website add-on. Another special edition pre-order of the album was on iTunes Music Store, and featured three live bonus tracks, as well as the entire album. Yet another pre-order of the album allowed customers who pre-ordered the album through Best Buy retailers to download the two songs, "Inside the Fire", and "Indestructible" as playable content on the video game Rock Band. Three songs from Disturbed's first online concert performance at DeepRockDrive were mastered and featured on the EP Live & Indestructible. On August 20, 2008 a music video directed by Noble Jones for the album's third single and title track, "Indestructible", was posted on Disturbed's website. The single was released digitally on September 29, 2008, and the music video was officially available for purchase the next day, packaged with the EP Live & Indestructible. Jones also directed the music video for the fourth single from Indestructible, "The Night", in January 2009, and it was released in late March 2009.

== Critical reception ==
Professional ratings
Aggregate scores
Source	Rating
Metacritic	57/100
Review scores
Source	Rating
AllMusic	3.5/5 stars
About.com	3.5/5 stars
Consequence of Sound	3.5/5 stars
IGN	5.5/10
The Music	3.5/5 stars
PopMatters	6/10
Q	2/5 stars
Rolling Stone	2/5 stars
Sea of Tranquility	4.5/5 stars

Critical reception for Indestructible was mixed. Being the first self-produced effort by the band, they had more leeway to create music without any outside interference, suggests 411mania writer Dan Marsicano. He concludes that the self-production also led to a lack of guidance, though, which ultimately works against the album, rather than helping it. Guitarist Dan Donegan's guitar work was praised, and About.com writer Chad Bowar notes many songs on the album are guitar-driven. Metaleater writer Chris Akin also praises Donegan, saying, "If there is growth in the band, it's in the guitars. Dan Donegan takes a much more 80s approach than he has on past recordings." AllMusic writer James Monger praised Indestructible, suggesting that rather than taking melodic elements from acts like Pantera, like Disturbed's previous records are suggested to, the album takes musical elements from acts such as Metallica or AC/DC.

Indestructible did, however, receive criticism. IGN writer Jim Kaz proposes that vocalist David Draiman has an "overly-forced" vocal delivery. Kaz also finds, "The tunes are largely similar in style and structure ... In essence, there's very little that stands out." He goes on to say that the album already seems obsolete, "There's just too much of the very recent past on Indestructible to move away from it. So in effect, it sounds a bit dated ... already." It is also suggested that, although possessing a reliably solid foundation, the album lacks a meaning behind its drive: "They wind up sounding a little lost on Indestructible, stabbing their weapons without any reasons behind each parry," says PopMatters writer Andrew Blackie.

== Commercial performance ==
Features	Standard	Special	Limited
Compact disc and booklet	Yes	Yes	Yes
Making of Indestructible DVD	No	Yes	Yes
"Inside the Fire" access code	No	Yes	Yes
VIP laminate	No	No	Yes
B-side "Run"	No	No	Yes

Indestructible shipped over 253,000 units in its opening week. It is also Disturbed's third consecutive studio album to debut at number one on the Billboard 200, and remain in the top ten for five weeks, making Disturbed one of six bands to ever achieve three consecutive number one debuts. It also peaked at number one in Canada, Australia, and New Zealand. Indestructible was certified 2× platinum by the Recording Industry Association of America in March 2025, for shipping over 2,000,000 copies in the United States. The album has also sold over one million copies worldwide. The album's lead single, "Inside the Fire", received significant radio airplay. The single remained at number one on Mediabase's Active Rock chart for fourteen weeks, setting a record as the longest running number one single on that specific chart. "Inside the Fire" was also nominated for a 2009 Grammy award in the "Best Hard Rock Performance" category. The title track, "Indestructible", also reached number one on Mediabase's Active Rock chart, making it Disturbed's second number one song on that chart in 2008.

== Track listing ==
All tracks are written by Disturbed.

No.	Title	Length
1.	"Indestructible"	4:37
2.	"Inside the Fire"	3:51
3.	"Deceiver"	3:49
4.	"The Night"	4:45
5.	"Perfect Insanity"	3:56
6.	"Haunted"	4:42
7.	"Enough"	4:19
8.	"The Curse"	3:24
9.	"Torn"	4:09
10.	"Criminal"	4:15
11.	"Divide"	3:36
12.	"Façade"	3:46
Total length:		49:09

Bonus tracks
No.	Title	Length
13.	"Run" (Limited edition additional track)	3:13
14.	"Parasite" (Japanese edition additional track)	3:23
15.	"Midlife Crisis" (Faith No More cover; Covered, A Revolution in Sound / limited edition additional track)	4:04
Total length:		59:49

iTunes bonus track version
No.	Title	Length
13.	"Stricken" (Live from Riviera)	4:27
14.	"Down with the Sickness" (Live from Riviera)	5:14
15.	"Just Stop" (Live from Riviera)	3:51
Total length:		62:41

Deluxe Edit
No.	Title	Length
13.	"Run"	3:13
14.	"Parasite"	3:23
15.	"Stricken" (Live from Riviera)	4:27
16.	"Down with the Sickness" (Live from Riviera)	5:14
17.	"Just Stop" (Live from Riviera)	3:51
18.	"Stupify" (Live from Riviera)	4:22
19.	"Midlife Crisis" (Faith No More cover)	4:04
Total length:		77:43

The three bonus tracks, "Run", "Parasite" and "Midlife Crisis" are included on the band's B-side compilation The Lost Children.

== Charts ==
Album

Chart (2008)	Peak position
Australian Albums Chart	1
Austrian Albums Chart	10
Belgian Albums Chart (Flanders)	49
Canadian Albums Chart	1
Danish Albums Chart	22
Dutch Albums Chart	57
Finnish Albums Chart	2
German Albums Chart	11
Irish Albums Chart	43
Japanese Albums Chart	63
New Zealand Albums Chart	1
Scottish Albums	29
Swedish Album Charts	15
Swiss Albums Chart	15
UK Albums Chart	20
US Billboard 200	1
US Alternative Albums Chart	1
US Digital Albums Chart	18
US Hard Rock Albums Chart	1
US Rock Albums Chart	1
US Tastemakers Albums Chart	1

Chart (2010)	Peak position
US Catalog Albums Chart	26

Singles

Year	Song	Chart	Peak position
2008	"Inside the Fire"	The Billboard Hot 100	73
2008	"Inside the Fire"	Canadian Hot 100	60
2008	"Inside the Fire"	Hot Canadian Digital Singles	66
2008	"Inside the Fire"	Hot Digital Songs	49
2008	"Inside the Fire"	Hot Mainstream Rock Tracks	1
2008	"Inside the Fire"	Hot Modern Rock Tracks	4
2008	"Inside the Fire"	Pop 100	66
2008	"Inside the Fire"	Australian Singles Chart	43
2008	"Inside the Fire"	Finnish Singles Chart	19
2008	"Inside the Fire"	New Zealand Singles Chart	18
2008	"Perfect Insanity"	Hot Canadian Digital Singles	70
2008	"Indestructible"	The Billboard Hot 100	72
2008	"Indestructible"	Canadian Hot 100	57
2008	"Indestructible"	Hot Canadian Digital Singles	40
2008	"Indestructible"	Hot Digital Songs	35
2008	"Indestructible"	Hot Mainstream Rock Tracks	2
2008	"Indestructible"	Hot Modern Rock Tracks	10
2009	"The Night"	Hot Mainstream Rock Tracks	2
2009	"The Night"	Hot Modern Rock Tracks	18

== Certifications ==
Region	Certification	Certified units/sales
Australia (ARIA)	Platinum	70,000^{^}
Canada (Music Canada)	3× Platinum	240,000^{‡}
Finland (Musiikkituottajat)	Gold	10,794
Germany (BVMI)	Gold	100,000^{‡}
New Zealand (RMNZ)	2× Platinum	30,000^{‡}
United Kingdom (BPI)	Gold	100,000^{*}
United States (RIAA)	2× Platinum	2,000,000^{‡}
^{*} Sales figures based on certification alone.^{^} Shipments figures based on certification alone.^{‡} Sales+streaming figures based on certification alone.

== Personnel ==
Disturbed

- David Draiman – lead vocals
- Dan Donegan – guitars, electronics
- John Moyer – bass, backing vocals
- Mike Wengren – drums, percussion

Production

- Dan Donegan – production
- David Draiman – production
- Mike Wengren – production
- Tadpole – engineering, Pro Tools
- Justin Wilks – assistant engineering
- Cameron Webb – Pro Tools
- Neal Avron – mixing
- Nick Fournier – mixing
- Ted Jensen – mastering
- Joey Lawrence – photography
- David Finch – cover illustration
- Matt Taylor – art direction and design

The Making of Indestructible DVD

- Directed by Rafa Alcantara
- Produced by Adam Cook and Twentyfourcore Productions
- Production assistant – Dan Fusselman
- Edited by JT Smith and Rafa Alcantara
- DVD post producer – David May
- DVD associate producer – Raena Winscott
- DVD Authoring – Jim Atkins for Media Services
