= Inside The Fire (disambiguation) =

1. REDIRECT Inside the Fire
