= Prayer (Disturbed song) =

Single by Disturbed

from the album Believe
- Released: September 16, 2002
- Recorded: 2002
- Studio: Groovemaster (Chicago, Illinois)
- Genre: Alternative metal; hard rock
- Length: 3:41
- Label: Reprise
- Songwriters: Steve Kmak; Dan Donegan; Mike Wengren; David Draiman
- Producers: Disturbed; Johnny K

Disturbed singles chronology
"The Game" (2001)	"Prayer" (2002)	"Remember" (2002)

Music video
- "Prayer" on YouTube

"Prayer" is a song by the American heavy metal band Disturbed. It was released on September 16, 2002, as the first single from their second studio album, Believe. The song was inspired by the death of vocalist David Draiman's grandfather as well as various circumstances after the September 11 attacks, and is about a conversation between Draiman and God. Upon release, many media outlets refused to air the "Prayer" music video, citing supposed similarities between the imagery of the music video and that of the September 11 attacks.

The song peaked at No. 3 on two US airplay charts, Billboard's Mainstream Rock Tracks and Modern Rock Tracks charts, as well as peaking at No. 58 on Billboard's Hot 100 and No. 14 on the Canadian Singles Chart. "Prayer" is Disturbed's second highest-charting single on the Billboard Hot 100 and their highest-charting single on the Modern Rock Tracks chart, and one of only two of their songs to reach the top five on the chart (the other being "Inside the Fire", which peaked at No. 4).

== Themes ==
"Prayer" was inspired lyrically by two events. The first event was the death of vocalist David Draiman's grandfather, the second was the September 11 attacks, chiefly the response the clergy made to the events. Draiman explained, "Instead of consoling their flock, people [of the clergy] like Jerry Falwell and Oral Roberts chastised them and used the situation as a means of empowerment, saying it was our own fault because we're a decadent and promiscuous people. I just thought that whole notion is ridiculous." Therefore, "Prayer" is about a conversation between Draiman and God. In the conversation, Draiman is telling God to "bring it on" if he is trying to use pain to elicit a response from Draiman.

== Music video ==
"Prayer" was directed by the Brothers Strause as a music video in late June 2002 and released the next month. Vocalist David Draiman, who wrote the treatment for the music video, explained that the music video is based on the story of Job from the Bible. Throughout the music video, Draiman is walking down a street and passes various scenes of desperation, such as a prostitute, a homeless man, and a preacher predicting the end of the world. As Draiman continues to walk, the other members of Disturbed have various disasters befall them, and are presumably killed. (Steve Kmak is buried under falling debris, Dan Donegan crashes his car, and Mike Wengren is hit by a nearby construction explosion.) At the climax of the music video, Draiman survives an earthquake, and the remaining band members eventually come back to life and congregate with Draiman to play the last chorus. Draiman explains, "It's like Job being put through trials and tribulations and still coming through unscathed and achieving his redemption."

Upon release, various media outlets refused to air the music video for "Prayer", citing its alleged similarities to imagery from the September 11 attacks in the United States. Disturbed originally made plans to edit the video for airplay, but eventually chose not to. Draiman explained this choice when he said, "If we agreed to edit the video...then it's assuming that we're agreeing with the decision that there's something about the video that is offensive enough or provocative enough that it's dangerous for them to play it. We don't agree with that." Draiman further criticizes the decision to take the video off of the air instead of other videos, "We don't have a character in our video who portrays Osama bin Laden and jumps and dances around, which is a direct recollective factor to 9/11."

The intent of the music video was not to depict similarity to the September 11 attacks, according to Draiman. He explained this by saying, "It was meant to be apocalyptic, but it was never intended to be derivative of the situation that happened on 9/11. Because of the subject matter...we needed something grandiose like an earthquake or a meteor shower or some kind of act of God to show the hand of the supernatural or some greater power." He further explained that the video was actually meant to be uplifting. Draiman said, "[The video is] about getting through life's obstacles and all the tests that fate may throw at you in the process. It's trying to convince you that you have the strength to get through whatever trials and tribulations may come your way. It's supposed to inspire hope." Despite "Prayer" receiving little airplay, Disturbed continued to promote the music video by including it on their album, Believe, and by posting it on various websites.

== Track listing ==
=== CD 1 ===
All tracks are written by Steve Kmak, Dan Donegan, Mike Wengren, David Draiman.

No.	Title	Length
1.	"Prayer"	3:39
2.	"Fear (Live)"	3:50
3.	"Conflict (Live)"	4:40
Total length:		12:09

=== CD 2 ===
No.	Title	Length
1.	"Prayer"	3:39
2.	"Droppin Plates (Live)"	3:56
3.	"Shout 2000 (Live)"	4:47
Total length:		12:22

=== Vinyl 7" red ===
No.	Title	Length
1.	"Prayer"	3:39
2.	"Fear (Live)"	3:53
Total length:		7:32

=== German version ===
No.	Title	Length
1.	"Prayer"	3:39
2.	"Fear (Live)"	3:53
3.	"Conflict (Live)"	4:40
4.	"Droppin' Plates (Live)"	3:56
Total length:		15:28

=== European and Australian promo ===
No.	Title	Length
1.	"Prayer (Album Version)"	3:41

== Personnel ==
- David Draiman – lead vocals, backing vocals
- Dan Donegan – guitar, electronics
- Steve Kmak – bass guitar
- Mike Wengren – drums
- Johnny K – producer
- Andy Wallace – mixer
- Howie Weinberg – mastering
- Tony Adams – technician
- Chris Glatfelter – technician
- Mick Haggerty – art direction, design

== Charts ==
=== Weekly charts ===
Weekly chart performance for "Prayer" by Disturbed
Chart (2002)	Peak position
Canada (Nielsen SoundScan)	14
Scotland Singles (OCC)	30
UK Singles (OCC)	31
UK Rock & Metal (OCC)	4
US Billboard Hot 100	58
US Alternative Airplay (Billboard)	3
US Mainstream Rock (Billboard)	3

=== Year-end charts ===
Year-end chart performance for "Prayer" by Disturbed
Chart (2002)	Position
Canada (Nielsen SoundScan)	70

== Certifications ==
Certifications for "Prayer"
Region	Certification	Certified units/sales
Canada (Music Canada)	Gold	40,000^{‡}
United States (RIAA)	Gold	500,000^{‡}
^{‡} Sales+streaming figures based on certification alone.
