= Indestructible (Disturbed song) =

Single by Disturbed

from the album Indestructible
- Released: September 29, 2008
- Recorded: February 2007 – January 2008 at Groovemaster Studios in Chicago, Illinois
- Genre: Heavy metal; hard rock; alternative metal
- Length: 4:38 (album version); 4:00 (radio edit)
- Label: Reprise
- Songwriters: Dan Donegan; Mike Wengren; David Draiman
- Producer: Dan Donegan

Disturbed singles chronology
"Perfect Insanity" (2008)	"Indestructible" (2008)	"The Night" (2009)

"Indestructible" is a song by American heavy metal band Disturbed, released as the third single from their studio album of the same name. The single peaked at No. 2 on the Hot Mainstream Rock Tracks chart and No. 10 on the Hot Modern Rock Tracks chart. The music video for the song appeared on Disturbed's website on August 20, 2008, and the single was released on September 29, 2008. "Indestructible" is meant to encourage troops going into battle, and boost their morale. It is also meant to represent Disturbed's success in the music industry. It is one of Disturbed's best known songs. The song appeared in the video game Midnight Club: Los Angeles.

== Lyrics ==
"Indestructible" is "an anthem for soldiers", vocalist David Draiman comments. "It's meant to be something that would make them feel invincible, take away their fear, make them strong." According to Draiman, the song also signifies Disturbed's lingering presence and success in the music industry. Draiman comments that the song "kind of symbolizes the fact that we're still fucking here, that we haven't been destroyed, that we withstood the test of time."

Guitarist Dan Donegan furthers this point, stating "We feel that we've become indestructible to be able to survive this long in the business, and continuing a success with it." Draiman concludes, "We have been through a lot. No matter what gets thrown at us, as a band, no matter what happens in the musical environment, we're still here, we're still viable, and still standing."

== Music video ==
A music video went into production in June 2008 with Noble Jones as the director, and was unveiled on August 20, 2008. It features high-concept battle scenes, reminiscent of the films 300 and 10,000 BC, intercut with footage of the band performing the song. The video shows the progression of war throughout history; from basic fighting with spears, to using modern weaponry such as firearms.

The video is unique in that it does break tradition from past historical depictions of armed combat that have, until a few years ago, always shown combatants to be exclusively male by featuring a closing scene of an armed female soldier-warrior, presumably American, charging headlong towards the threat to her fellow soldiers, her "brothers-in-arms".

== Track listing ==
UK

All tracks are written by Disturbed.

No.	Title	Length
1.	"Indestructible (Album Version)"	4:38
2.	"Indestructible (Edit)"	3:59
Total length:		8:37

UK 7" vinyl limited edition

No.	Title	Length
1.	"Indestructible"	4:38
2.	"Inside the Fire"	3:52
Total length:		8:30

Digital

No.	Title	Length
1.	"Indestructible"	4:38
2.	"Inside the Fire"	3:59
Total length:		8:37

== Chart positions ==
Chart (2008)	Position
US Billboard Hot 100	72
Hot Canadian Digital Singles	40
Hot Digital Songs	35
Hot Mainstream Rock Tracks	2
Hot Modern Rock Tracks	10
UK Rock & Metal (Official Charts)	2

== Certifications ==
Region	Certification	Certified units/sales
Australia (ARIA)	Platinum	70,000^{‡}
Canada (Music Canada)	2× Platinum	160,000^{‡}
New Zealand (RMNZ)	Gold	15,000^{‡}
United Kingdom (BPI)	Silver	200,000^{‡}
United States (RIAA)	2× Platinum	2,000,000^{‡}
^{‡} Sales+streaming figures based on certification alone.

== Personnel ==
- Dan Donegan – guitar, producer, electronics
- David Draiman – lead vocals, backing vocals co-producer
- Mike Wengren – drums, co-producer
- John Moyer – bass guitar, backing vocals
- Neal Avron – mixing

== Release history ==
Region	Date	Label	Format
Worldwide	September 29, 2008	Reprise	Digital download
United States	October 6, 2008	Reprise	7"; CD
United Kingdom	October 6, 2008	Reprise	CD
