= Remember (Disturbed song) =

Single by Disturbed

from the album Believe
- Released: December 3, 2002
- Recorded: March–April 2002 at Groovemaster Studios in Chicago, Illinois
- Genre: Alternative metal; hard rock
- Length: 4:12
- Label: Reprise
- Songwriters: Steve Kmak; Dan Donegan; Mike Wengren; David Draiman
- Producers: Disturbed; Johnny K

Disturbed singles chronology
"Prayer" (2002)	"Remember" (2002)	"Liberate" (2003)

Music video
- "Remember" on YouTube

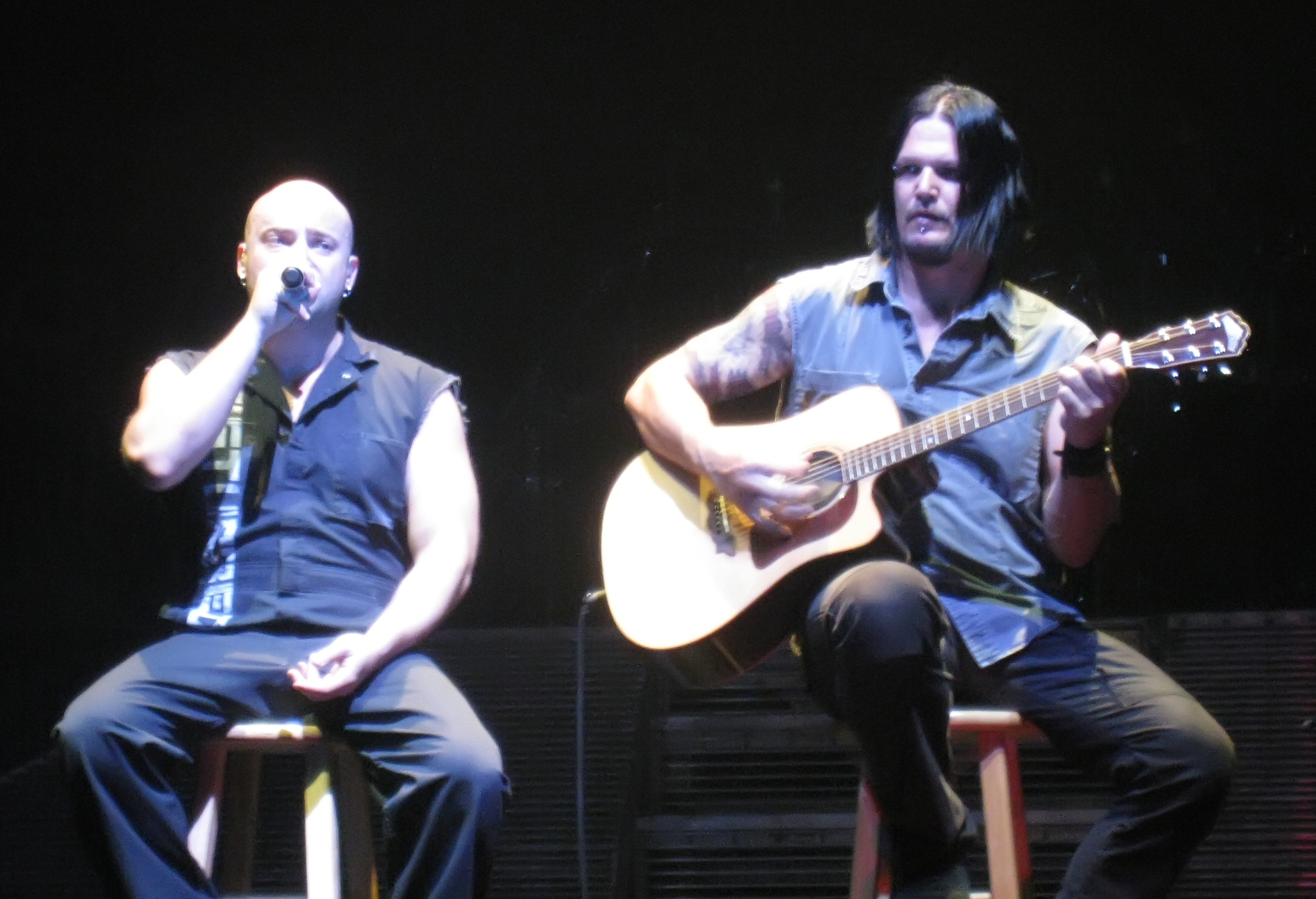
David Draiman and Dan Donegan performing the first part of "Remember" in an acoustic version

"Remember" is a song by American heavy metal band Disturbed. It was released on December 3, 2002, as the second single from their second studio album Believe. Vocalist David Draiman stated that "Remember" is his favorite from the first two Disturbed albums.

On their 2009 Music as a Weapon IV tour, this song was performed on acoustic guitar, with only vocals and guitar for most of the song.

== Music videos ==
Two music videos were made: the first features a live playing of the song by the band and another features the band playing on a small stage with a set of screens behind them, showing words and clips that reflect on the song. In the second version of the music, it featured various important lines flash on TV screens as they are sung. Before the music even begins, however, a TV flashes the words “The past is indestructible” signifying that no matter what happens, you can’t escape the past.

== Track listing ==
=== CD 1 ===
1. "Remember" – 4:07
2. "Remember" (live) – 4:22
3. "Rise" (live) – 4:10

=== CD 2 ===
1. "Remember" – 4:07
2. "Bound" (live) – 3:58
3. "Mistress" (live) – 3:51

=== 7" vinyl ===
1. "Remember" – 4:07
2. "Remember" (live) – 4:22

=== Japanese import ===
1. "Remember" – 4:10
2. "Remember" (live) – 4:24
3. "Rise" (live) – 4:09
4. "Bound" (live) – 3:53

=== European promo ===
1. "Remember" (album version) – 4:07

== Personnel ==
- David Draiman – vocals
- Dan Donegan – guitars, electronics
- Steve "Fuzz" Kmak – bass
- Mike Wengren – drums

== Chart positions ==
Year	Chart	Position
2002	United Kingdom (OCC)	56
2002	US Mainstream Rock Tracks	6
2002	US Modern Rock Tracks	22
2002	US Bubbling Under Hot 100	10
