= Perfect Insanity =

Single by Disturbed

from the album Indestructible
- Released: May 6, 2008
- Recorded: February 2007 – January 2008 at Groovemaster Studios in Chicago, Illinois
- Genre: Heavy metal; hard rock; alternative metal
- Length: 3:57
- Label: Reprise
- Songwriters: Steve Kmak; Dan Donegan; Mike Wengren; David Draiman
- Producer: Dan Donegan

Disturbed singles chronology
| "Inside the Fire" (2008) | "Perfect Insanity" (2008) | "Indestructible" (2008) |

"Perfect Insanity" is a song by American heavy metal band Disturbed, released as a single from their fourth album Indestructible. The song was originally written by the band prior to their debut album, The Sickness, and was previously released on the band's documentary, M.O.L., as a demo track with a music video. The band re-recorded the song in 2007 and released it on Indestructible. It is also featured in the video game WWE SmackDown vs. Raw 2009 and is a downloadable track in the Rock Band series.

An alternate title for the song, as seen in the booklet for the Indestructible CD, is "Condemnation".

== Themes ==
According to vocalist David Draiman, the song's meaning is "toying with the idea of insanity. Coming at you from the perspective from the individual who is [insane] and warning people around him, particularly his love interests, about his psychotic tendencies."

== Music video ==
45 second sample comparing the 2008 Indestructible recording of "Perfect Insanity" and the 1998 demo version.

No music video has been released for the re-recorded version of this song. However, on the band's home documentary, M.O.L., an old music video can be viewed, made in 1998. The video depicts vocalist David Draiman, locked inside of a room, in a straitjacket. As he tries to break free, the video shows the band playing variously on a stage, in between clips of Draiman trying to escape from the straitjacket. As the song finishes, the video switches to a scene of a graveyard, implying Draiman had died insane.

== Chart performance ==
| Chart (2008) | Position |
|---|---|
| Hot Canadian Digital Singles | 70 |

== Personnel ==
- David Draiman – lead vocals, backing vocals, co-producer
- Dan Donegan – guitars, electronics, producer
- John Moyer – bass guitar, backing vocals
- Mike Wengren – drums, co-producer
