= Believe (Disturbed album) =

Studio album by Disturbed
- Released: September 17, 2002
- Recorded: March–April 2002
- Studios: Groovemaster Studios, Chicago, Illinois
- Genre: Nu metal
- Length: 47:16
- Label: Reprise
- Producer: Johnny K

Disturbed chronology
The Sickness (2000)	Believe (2002)	Music as a Weapon II (2004)

Singles from this album
- 1. "Prayer" Released: August 14, 2002; 2. "Remember" Released: December 3, 2002; 3. "Liberate" Released: February 18, 2003

Believe is the second studio album by American heavy metal band Disturbed, released on September 17, 2002 via Reprise Records. Produced by the band and Johnny K, it focuses heavily on religious and spiritual themes inspired by recent tragedies. With greater emphasis on melodic dynamics, it also demonstrates a broadening in the band's musical range compared to their 2000 debut The Sickness. Believe was the last studio album to feature original bassist Steve "Fuzz" Kmak before he was fired from the band in 2003.

Believe debuted at number one on the US Billboard 200, making it Disturbed's first number one debut, selling over 284,000 copies in its first week of sales. It was certified double platinum by the RIAA in the United States on September 23, 2008. Three singles were released from the album: "Prayer", "Remember", and "Liberate".

== Background and recording ==
With Black Sabbath's August 2001 tour canceled, and Disturbed's opening slot with it, the Chicago quartet planned to use the month following Ozzfest to begin pre-production of their next album while preparing for their own headlining tour.

That summer, vocalist David Draiman's grandfather, an Orthodox Jew, died in Israel. At a young age, Draiman was beloved by his grandfather; however, when Draiman became a heavy metal musician, his elder cut off their communication. It was not until the grandfather fell ill that he wished to see his grandson. But by the time word got to Draiman, who was on Ozzfest, his grandfather had mere hours to live. Regarding his grandfather's death, he noted, "No one could look at the aura I projected over the course of that next week and not feel my pain and those feelings very definitely will present themselves on the record."

That same month, Draiman had undergone surgery to remove a damaged valve that was causing acid to spill on his vocal cords. The successful surgery not only repaired Draiman's voice but also allegedly broadened his vocal range.

The band entered K's Groovemaster Studios in mid March 2002 to begin recording with producer Johnny K, the man behind their debut album. The majority of songs, which reportedly included about 10 at the time, had been written since November the previous year, including "Prayer" which debuted during Ozzfest.

By mid-April, Disturbed had completed 12 songs for Believe. In an interview with MTV, Draiman elaborated how the reevaluating of his own Jewish heritage and compromises of life as a musician affected his writing. He noted the album as being "the greatest work we have ever done in our lives" but also expressed concern over how fans would react to the vulnerability and vast expression of emotions showcased on the album.

== Music and lyrics ==
As The Sickness, Believe has been described as nu metal, but stylistically it witnessed the band place more emphasis on lead guitar and melodic complexity. This musical progression would follow through on future Disturbed albums where guitar solos would become commonplace. While The Sickness focused on heavy compositions, Disturbed's sophomore effort varies more greatly in its range of heaviness and melody, closing with a somber, acoustic ballad entitled "Darkness". Singer David Draiman also wished to demonstrate a greater vocal dimension than the intense style he was previously associated with. Nevertheless, he described the content of the album as "pure and unadulterated in every sense of the word 'metal'".

As noted by Draiman, Believe contains overt religious and spiritual themes. These were inspired by various experiences such as the September-11-attacks and the recent death of Draiman's Orthodox Jewish grandfather:

"All the songs on the record revolve around the theme of belief in oneself and in humanity's potential... And the right-wing reactions of religious leaders of the world to the events of 9/11 had a lot to do with the original impetus of where this record came from. It angered me beyond any way I could possibly explain. The whole album's about questioning your beliefs to determine what you really can believe in."

Lyrically, the album deals with various other topics as well. "Remember" delves into the cutthroat nature of the music industry as well as Draiman's resistance to indulgent partying; "Awaken" deals with America's never-ending obsession with vacuous "wallpaper music"; the tracks "Bound" and "Intoxication" focus on Draiman's inability to have a meaningful romantic relationship. In an interview, he noted, "I've had various experiences with women over the past two-and-a-half years that have made me have several chips on my shoulder - not in an angry way necessarily, but almost in a pleading way. I'm at a point in my life where I've had my heart torn apart so many times that there's just not much left to it".

In keeping with the lyrical themes, the album cover features symbols of major religions, including the Jewish Star of David, the Islamic crescent, the Wiccan pentacle, and the Christian cross. Draiman explained the meaning of the symbol on stage during the Music as a Weapon II Tour:

"The symbol that you see elevated above the set behind me is a symbol of universal belief."

== Touring and promotion ==
Believe boasted three singles which gained substantial radio and video airplay. The lead single, "Prayer", featured a video with apocalyptic imagery of a city being destroyed. This led some outlets to refuse to play the video on the grounds that it conjures similarities to the September 11 attacks. After initially considering to edit the video, Disturbed ultimately chose not to. Follow up singles "Remember" and "Liberate" also charted well and gained significant rotation on radio and television. The title track "Believe," although not a single, would also find its way to radio airwaves.

In 2003, Disturbed headlined Music as a Weapon II with Chevelle, Taproot, and Ünloco. A live album, featuring Disturbed's cover of "Fade to Black", would result in 2004. Upon finishing the tour, Steve Kmak was fired by the band because of "personality differences". He was soon replaced by John Moyer, and the group joined the Main Stage of Ozzfest 2003.

"Liberate" appeared on the soundtrack for the video game Tony Hawk's Underground 2. "Intoxication" appeared on the soundtrack for NFL GameDay 2004.

== Critical reception ==
Professional ratings
Aggregate scores
Source	Rating
Metacritic	62/100
Review scores
Source	Rating
AllMusic	4/5 stars
Blender	3/5 stars
Entertainment Weekly	B+
Kludge	5/10
NME	2/10
Q	2/5 stars
Rock Hard	8/10
Rolling Stone	3/5 stars
Spin	4/10

Believe currently holds a score of 62 out of 100 on review-aggregating website Metacritic, indicating "generally favorable reviews", based on nine reviews. AllMusic's Bradley Torreano praised the album, declaring that on Believe, Disturbed takes the kind of leap that their heroes in Soundgarden and Pantera had after their respective albums of progress. He also states that "it is not a function of the agitation of the tempo and percussion-based riffing of the past; guitarist Dan Donegan has made great strides in expanding its sound to include more varied guitar work all around." Greg Cot from Rolling Stone called the record "a skillful, if calculated, variation on the melodrama-meets-mayhem formula that has been driving the most commercially successful new metal in recent years," praising Andy Wallace's mixing of Wengren's drumming for having "a John Bonham-like prominence" and Donegan's guitar work for having the feel of "a percussive hammer." Ben Mitchell of Blender gave credit to the band for doing away any idiosyncratic vocal work and rap metal flourishes from their debut effort for more political topics and highlighted both Donegan's guitar line as well as Draiman's melodic delivery, saying that "Musically, Believe is as solid as this kind of generic support-slot-on-Ozzfest stuff gets and — thank Christ — at least there’s no DJ." He concluded that "Overwhelmingly, though, Disturbed have yet to come to terms with just how average they really are — seldom unlistenable, never inspirational, but consistently merely OK." Culturedose.net cited Believe as "one of the best rock albums of 2002". In 2005, Believe was ranked number 429 in Rock Hard magazine's book The 500 Greatest Rock & Metal Albums of All Time.

== Commercial performance ==
Believe debuted at number 1 on the Billboard 200 chart, making it Disturbed's first number 1 debut, and shipped over 284,000 copies in its first week. The album also debuted at number 2 on the Canadian Albums Chart, selling 13,400 copies in the country in its first week.

By January 2003, SoundScan had recorded over 1 million album sales. The record was certified double platinum by the RIAA in the United States on September 23, 2008.

== Track listing ==
All tracks are written by Disturbed.

No.	Title	Length
1.	"Prayer"	3:41
2.	"Liberate"	3:30
3.	"Awaken"	4:29
4.	"Believe"	4:27
5.	"Remember"	4:11
6.	"Intoxication"	3:14
7.	"Rise"	3:57
8.	"Mistress"	3:46
9.	"Breathe"	4:21
10.	"Bound"	3:53
11.	"Devour"	3:52
12.	"Darkness"	3:55
Total length:		47:16

Japanese bonus track
No.	Title	Writer(s)	Length
13.	"Shout 2000 (Live)" (Tears for Fears cover)	Roland Orzabal; Ian Stanley	4:48
Total length:			52:04

DVD Audio
No.	Title	Length
13.	"Prayer (The Video)"	3:44
14.	"Behind the Scenes on the (Prayer) Video Set"	7:45
15.	"In the Studio Recording (Believe)"	4:46
16.	"Highlights from Disturbed's DVD (M.O.L.)"	9:27
Total length:		72:58

Australian tour edition bonus disc
No.	Title	Length
1.	"Remember" (live)	4:22
2.	"Bound" (live)	3:51
3.	"Fear" (live)	3:50
4.	"Conflict" (live)	4:40
5.	"Droppin' Plates" (live)	3:57
Total length:		20:40

== Personnel ==
Credits adapted from the liner notes of Believe.

Disturbed

- David Draiman – vocals
- Dan Donegan – guitar, keyboards
- Steve "Fuzz" Kmak – bass
- Mike Wengren – drums, percussion

Additional musicians

- Alison Chesley – cello on "Darkness"

Production

- Johnny K – producer
- Disturbed – producers
- Andy Wallace – mixing
- Howie Weinberg – mastering
- Tony Adams – studio drum technician
- Chris "Rock" Glatfelter – studio guitar technician

Design

- Mick Haggerty – art direction and design
- Stephen Danelian – photography

== Charts ==
=== Weekly charts ===
Weekly chart performance for Believe by Disturbed
Chart (2002)	Peak position
Australian Albums (ARIA)	32
Austrian Albums (Ö3 Austria)	42
Canadian Albums (Billboard)	2
Danish Albums (Hitlisten)	30
Europe (European Top 100 Albums)	74
Finnish Albums (Suomen virallinen lista)	33
German Albums (Offizielle Top 100)	68
Irish Albums (IRMA)	42
New Zealand Albums (RMNZ)	1
Scottish Albums (Official Charts)	51
Swedish Albums (Sverigetopplistan)	35
Swiss Albums (Schweizer Hitparade)	91
UK Albums (Official Charts)	41
UK Rock & Metal Albums (OCC)	3
US Billboard 200	1

Chart (2019)	Peak position
Hungarian Albums (MAHASZ)	27

=== Year-end charts ===
Year-end chart performance for Believe by Disturbed
Chart (2002)	Position
Canadian Albums (Nielsen SoundScan)	115
Canadian Alternative Albums (Nielsen SoundScan)	33
Canadian Metal Albums (Nielsen SoundScan)	16
US Billboard 200	102
Chart (2003)	Position
US Billboard 200	115

=== Singles ===
Year	Song	Chart	Peak position
2002	"Prayer"	Hot Mainstream Rock Tracks	3
2002	"Prayer"	Alternative Songs	3
2002	"Prayer"	The Billboard Hot 100	58
2002	"Prayer"	Canadian Singles Chart	14
2002	"Prayer"	UK Singles Chart	31
2002	"Remember"	Hot Mainstream Rock Tracks	6
2002	"Remember"	Alternative Songs	22
2002	"Remember"	UK Singles Chart	56
2003	"Liberate"	Hot Mainstream Rock Tracks	4
2003	"Liberate"	Alternative Songs	22

== Certifications ==
Region	Certification	Certified units/sales
Australia (ARIA)	Platinum	70,000^{^}
Canada (Music Canada)	Platinum	100,000^{^}
New Zealand (RMNZ)	Gold	7,500^{^}
United Kingdom (BPI)	Gold	100,000^{‡}
United States (RIAA)	2× Platinum	2,000,000^{^}
^{^} Shipments figures based on certification alone.^{‡} Sales+streaming figures based on certification alone.
