= Inside the Fire =

Single by Disturbed

from the album Indestructible
- B-side: "Perfect Insanity"
- Released: March 25, 2008
- Recorded: February 2007 – January 2008
- Studio: Groovemaster Studios in Chicago, Illinois
- Genre: Alternative metal
- Length: 3:52
- Label: Reprise
- Songwriters: Dan Donegan; David Draiman; Mike Wengren
- Producer: Dan Donegan

Disturbed singles chronology
"Ten Thousand Fists" (2006)	"Inside the Fire" (2008)	"Perfect Insanity" (2008)

Music video
- "Inside the Fire" on YouTube

"Inside the Fire" (alternatively known as "Devon") is a song by American heavy metal band Disturbed. The song was released as the lead single from the band's fourth studio album, Indestructible (2008), on March 25, 2008, as a digital download. The song features suicidal themes, and, in May 2008, a music video was unveiled for the song. However, due to the involvement of suicidal themes in the uncensored music video, an edited version of the song and music video was released, in which these themes are absent.

On March 24, 2008, "Inside the Fire" debuted on more than sixty radio stations, quickly showing up on many significant music charts and reaching number 73 on the Billboard Hot 100 chart, and number one on the Hot Mainstream Rock Chart. The single became nominated for a Grammy Award in the "Best Hard Rock Performance" category. The song was featured in 2008 video game Madden NFL 09. The single was certified 2× Platinum in the United States, gold in Australia, and platinum in both Canada and New Zealand.

== Interpretation ==
According to vocalist David Draiman, the song is "a real racy song... about me standing over the body of my girlfriend, who just killed herself, and the Devil is standing over me, whispering in my ear to kill myself."

Commenting further for The Pulse of Radio, Draiman stated, "it is based on a true story of my own where, when I was about 16 or so, I had a girlfriend of mine commit suicide," he said. "It was an unbelievably horrific and painful experience, and it was cathartic to make the song, and it really took me having a certain mindset to do it, and I had to wait 'til I was ready."

== Music video ==
A music video for "Inside the Fire" premiered on May 2, 2008. A suicide hotline phone number appears before the video, due to its nature and content, along with a message from vocalist David Draiman regarding suicide. An "all-performance" version of the video premiered later, featuring no dark themes or messages.

The video begins with a girl (assumed to be Draiman's girlfriend) hanging herself in her apartment. Draiman arrives at the apartment, only to find her dead. He cuts her down and places her body on a couch, taking in what has happened. He then cleans her in a bathtub. He goes back out to the room in which she hung herself, and looks out of the door, making sure no one is there. Mentally stricken, he takes a gun placed on the wall and aims the barrel into his own mouth and starts screaming. The camera then fades out and back in, showing Draiman restrained in a straitjacket, showing that he could not bring himself to commit suicide. The edited version of the music video, which does not feature any suicidal themes whatsoever, simply depicts Disturbed playing the song in a dark room, with the band members occasionally covered in blood.

== Track listing ==
Compact disc

All tracks are written by Disturbed.

No.	Title	Length
1.	"Inside the Fire"	3:52
Total length:		3:52

7" vinyl

No.	Title	Length
1.	"Inside the Fire"	3:52
2.	"Perfect Insanity"	3:59
Total length:		7:51

Digital download

No.	Title	Length
1.	"Inside the Fire"	3:52
Total length:		3:52

United Kingdom digital download

No.	Title	Length
1.	"Inside the Fire"	3:52
2.	"Parasite"	3:25
3.	"Stricken (Live At the Riviera)"	4:27
Total length:		11:44

== Personnel ==
- David Draiman – vocals, co-producer
- Dan Donegan – guitars, electronics, producer
- John Moyer – bass guitar
- Mike Wengren – drums, co-producer

== Charts ==
On March 24, 2008, "Inside the Fire" debuted on more than sixty radio stations. The song peaked at number one on the Billboard Mainstream Rock Tracks chart and number four on the Modern Rock Tracks chart. It also peaked at number seventy-three on the Billboard Hot 100 and number sixty-seven on the Pop 100. The song is Disturbed's sixth number-one hit on Mediabase's Active Rock charts.

=== Weekly charts ===
Chart (2008)	Peak position
Billboard Hot 100	73
Mainstream Rock Tracks	1
Modern Rock Tracks	4
Pop 100	67

== Certifications ==
Region	Certification	Certified units/sales
Australia (ARIA)	Gold	35,000^{‡}
Canada (Music Canada)	Platinum	80,000^{‡}
New Zealand (RMNZ)	Platinum	30,000^{‡}
United States (RIAA)	2× Platinum	2,000,000^{‡}
^{‡} Sales+streaming figures based on certification alone.

== See also ==
- List of number-one mainstream rock hits (United States)
