= HammerFall discography =

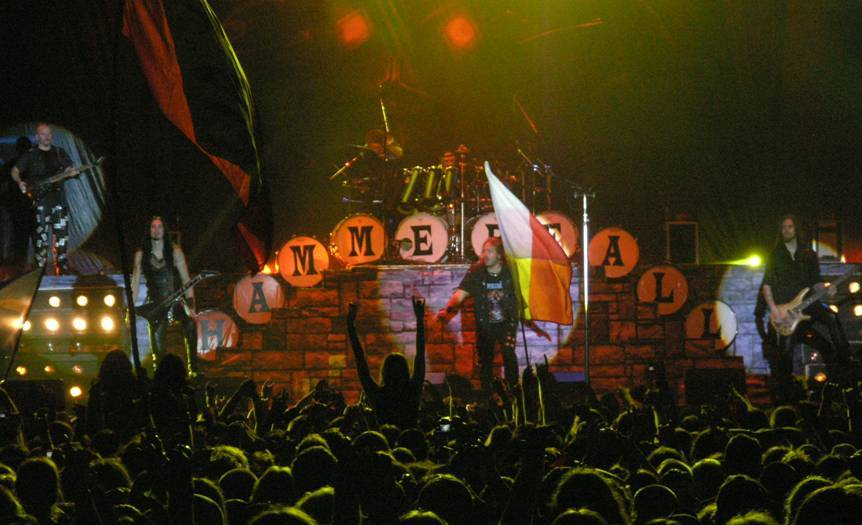
- HammerFall performing at Masters of Rock 2007
- Studio albums: 13
- Live albums: 3
- Compilation albums: 3
- Singles: 15
- Video albums: 6
- Music videos: 41

HammerFall is a Swedish power metal band from Gothenburg. The band was formed in 1993 by ex-Ceremonial Oath guitarist Oscar Dronjak. As of February 2020 they have released 13 studio albums.

== Albums ==
=== Studio albums ===
Title	Album details	Peak chart positions							
Title	Album details	SWE	AUT	FRA	GER	JPN	SWI	EUR	BEL
Glory to the Brave	Released: 27 June 1997; Label: Nuclear Blast (#265); Format: CD, LP	—	40	—	38	—	—	—	—
Legacy of Kings	Released: 28 September 1998; Label: Nuclear Blast (#335); Format: CD, LP	15	34	—	15	71	—	—	—
Renegade	Released: 9 October 2000; Label: Nuclear Blast (#511); Format: CD, LP; Certification: GOLD	1	43	—	17	40	72	—	—
Crimson Thunder	Released: 28 October 2002; Label: Nuclear Blast (#1031); Format: CD, LP; Certification: PLATINUM	3	65	134	13	82	83	—	—
Chapter V: Unbent, Unbowed, Unbroken	Released: 4 March 2005; Label: Nuclear Blast (#1375); Format: CD, LP	4	36	159	12	163	39	27	—
Threshold	Released: 18 October 2006; Label: Nuclear Blast (#1752); Format: CD, LP	1	30	192	15	146	32	23	—
No Sacrifice, No Victory	Released: 20 February 2009; Label: Nuclear Blast; Format: CD, LP; Certification: GOLD	2	25	95	7	—	20	—	92
Infected	Released: 20 May 2011; Label: Nuclear Blast; Format: CD, LP	2	17	—	9	—	21	—	—
(r)Evolution	Released: 27 August 2014; Label: Nuclear Blast; Format: CD, LP	1	13	85	4	—	5	—	90
Built to Last	Released: 4 November 2016; Label: Napalm; Format: CD, LP	6	19	—	8	—	15	—	96
Dominion	Released: 16 August 2019; Label: Napalm; Format: CD, LP	2	11	126	4	—	2	—	48
Hammer of Dawn	Released: 25 February 2022; Label: Napalm; Format: CD, LP	4	14	127	5	—	9	—	95
Avenge the Fallen	Released: 9 August 2024; Label: Nuclear Blast; Format: CD, LP	1	—	—	3	—	2	—	129
"—" denotes releases that did not chart or were not released in that country.

=== Live albums ===
Title	Album details	Peak	
Title	Album details	SWE	GER
One Crimson Night	Released: 20 October 2003; Label: Nuclear Blast (#1196); Format: CD, LP, digital download	15	58
Gates of Dalhalla	Released: 30 November 2012; Label: Nuclear Blast; Format: 2xCD, DVD-V, Blu-ray, digital download	—	73
Live! Against the World	Released: 23 October 2020; Label: Napalm; Format: 2xCD, LP, Blu-ray, digital download	16	14

=== Compilation albums ===
Title	Album details	Peak chart positions				
Title	Album details	SWE	AUT	GER	SWI	US Euro.
Steel Meets Steel: Ten Years of Glory	Released: 12 October 2007; Label: Nuclear Blast (#1935); Format: CD	15	38	53	51	93
The Vinyl Single Collection	Released: 22 February 2008; Label: Nuclear Blast; Format: 4 × Vinyl, 7", Picture Disc, Limited Edition	—	—	—	—	—
Masterpieces	Released: 27 June 2008; Label: Nuclear Blast; Format: CD, LP, digital download	15	—	69	38	—
"—" denotes releases that did not chart or were not released in that country.

== Singles ==
Year	Song	Peak chart positions					Album
Year	Song	SWE	AUT	GER	SWI	US Euro.	Album
1997	"Glory to the Brave"	—	—	—	—	—	Glory to the Brave
1998	"Heeding the Call"	—	—	48	—	—	Legacy of Kings
1999	"I Want Out"	75	—	55	—	—	Legacy of Kings
2000	"Renegade"	17	—	89	—	—	Renegade
2000	"Always Will Be"	50	—	—	—	—	Renegade
2002	"Hearts on Fire"	11	—	58	—	—	Crimson Thunder
2005	"Blood Bound"	5	—	54	85	91	Chapter V: Unbent, Unbowed, Unbroken
2006	"The Fire Burns Forever"	—	—	—	—	—	Threshold
2006	"Natural High"	6	71	79	83	—	Threshold
2007	"Last Man Standing"	—	—	—	—	—	Steel Meets Steel - Ten Years of Glory
2009	"Any Means Necessary"	—	—	—	—	—	No Sacrifice, No Victory
2010	"My Sharona"	—	—	—	—	—	No Sacrifice, No Victory
2011	"One More Time"	—	—	—	—	—	Infected
2011	"B.Y.H"	—	—	—	—	—	Infected
2011	"Send Me a Sign"	—	—	—	—	—	Infected
2014	"Bushido"	—	—	—	—	—	(r)Evolution
2014	"Hector's Hymn"	—	—	—	—	—	(r)Evolution
"—" denotes releases that did not chart or were not released in that country.

== Video albums ==
Year	Video details	Peak	
Year	Video details	SWE	GER
1999	The First Crusade	—	—
2002	The Templar Renegade Crusades	—	—
2002	Hearts on Fire	—	—
2003	One Crimson Night	—	—
2008	Rebels with a Cause: Unruly, Unrestrained, Uninhibited	15	81
2012	Gates of Dalhalla	—	—
2020	Live! Against the World	—	—
"—" denotes releases that did not chart.

== Music videos ==
- "Hammerfall" (1997)
- "Glory to the Brave" (First Version) (1997)
- "Glory to the Brave" (Second Version) (1997)
- "Heeding The Call" (1998)
- "Let the Hammer Fall" (live) (1998)
- "I Want Out" (feat. Kai Hansen) (1999)
- "Renegade" (2000)
- "Always Will Be" (2000)
- "Hearts On Fire" (First Version) (2002)
- "Hearts On Fire" (Second Version) (2005)
- "Blood Bound" (2005)
- "Natural High" (2006)
- "The Fire Burns Forever" (2006)
- "Last Man Standing" (Extended Version) (2007)
- "HammerFall v2.0.07 (MPEG video - Rough mix version)" (2007)
- "Any Means Necessary" (2009)
- "A Legend Reborn" (live) (2011)
- "One More Time" (2011)
- "Send Me a Sign" (live) (2011)
- "Gates Of Dalhalla" (live) (2012)
- "Threshold" (live) (2012)
- "Hector's Hymn" (2014)
- "The Sacred Vow" (Lyric Video) (2016)
- "Hammer High" (2016)
- "Built to Last" (2017)
- "(We Make) Sweden Rock" (First Version) (2019)
- "(We Make) Sweden Rock" (Second Version) (2019)
- "One Against the World" (2019)
- "Dominion" (2019)
- "Second to One" (featuring Noora Louhimo) (2020)
- "Templars of Steel" (live) (2021)
- "Renegade" (live) (2021)
- "Hammer of Dawn" (2021)
- "Venerate Me" (Visualizer) (2022)
- "Brotherhood" (2022)
- "Riders of the Storm" (Lyric Video) (2023)
- "Crimson Thunder Medley" (2023)
- "Hail To The King" (2024)
- "The End Justifies" (2024)
- "Avenge The Fallen" (2024)
- "Freedom" (2024)
