= Steel Meets Steel: Ten Years of Glory =

Compilation album by HammerFall
- Released: 23 October 2007
- Recorded: 1997–2007
- Genre: Power metal, heavy metal
- Length: 142:10
- Label: Nuclear Blast

HammerFall chronology
Threshold (2006)	Steel Meets Steel: Ten Years of Glory (2007)	Masterpieces (2008)

Singles from Steel Meets Steel: Ten Years of Glory
- 1. "Last Man Standing" Released: 14 September 2007

Professional ratings
Review scores
Source	Rating
Puregrainaudio	7/10 stars

Steel Meets Steel: Ten Years of Glory is the first compilation album by Swedish power metal band HammerFall, released on 23 October 2007.

The album consists of two discs compiling (and remastering) some of the band's most popular works from 1997 to 2006, as well as three new songs ("The Abyss", "Last Man Standing", and "Restless Soul").

It is one of the few albums where the band mascot, the knight Hector, does not appear.

The song "Last Man Standing" was also released as a single but it was only sold online as an .mp3-file. The song was also made into a music video.

== Track listing ==
Listing:

Disc one
No.	Title	Writer(s)	Released On	Length
1.	"The Abyss"		New	2:14
2.	"Last Man Standing"		New	4:30
3.	"HammerFall v2.0.07 (appears as v1.07 on the iTunes digital version)"			4:47
4.	"The Dragon Lies Bleeding"	Jesper Strömblad, Joacim Cans	Glory to the Brave	4:23
5.	"Steel Meets Steel"	Oscar Dronjak	Glory to the Brave	4:00
6.	"Glory to the Brave"	Dronjak, Strömblad, Cans	Glory to the Brave	7:20
7.	"Heeding the Call"	Dronjak, Cans, Strömblad	Legacy of Kings	4:31
8.	"At the End of the Rainbow"	Dronjak, Cans, Strömblad	Legacy of Kings	4:06
9.	"Legacy of Kings"	Dronjak, Cans, Strömblad	Legacy of Kings	4:13
10.	"Let the Hammer Fall (Live)"			5:52
11.	"Templars of Steel"	Dronjak, Cans	Renegade	5:27
12.	"Renegade"	Dronjak, Cans, Strömblad	Renegade	4:23
13.	"Always Will Be"	Dronjak	Renegade	4:52
14.	"Keep the Flame Burning"	Dronjak, Cans, Strömblad	Renegade	4:40
15.	"Riders of the Storm"	Dronjak, Cans	Crimson Thunder	4:34
Total length:				69:52

Disc two
No.	Title	Writer(s)	Released On	Length
1.	"Hearts on Fire"	Dronjak, Cans	Crimson Thunder	3:51
2.	"Crimson Thunder"	Dronjak, Cans	Crimson Thunder	5:05
3.	"Hero's Return"	Dronjak, Cans	Crimson Thunder	5:21
4.	"Blood Bound"	Dronjak, Cans	Chapter V: Unbent, Unbowed, Unbroken	3:48
5.	"Secrets"	Dronjak, Cans	Chapter V: Unbent, Unbowed, Unbroken	6:06
6.	"Fury of the Wild"	Dronjak, Cans	Chapter V: Unbent, Unbowed, Unbroken	4:45
7.	"Never, Ever"	Dronjak	Chapter V: Unbent, Unbowed, Unbroken	4:07
8.	"Threshold"	Dronjak, Cans	Threshold	4:45
9.	"Natural High"	Dronjak, Cans	Threshold	4:15
10.	"Dark Wings, Dark Words"	Dronjak, Cans	Threshold	5:03
11.	"The Fire Burns Forever"	Dronjak, Cans	Threshold	3:22
12.	"Restless Soul"		New	5:29
13.	"The Metal Age (Live)"			4:25
14.	"Stone Cold (Live)"			7:00
15.	"HammerFall v2.0.07 (MPEG video - Rough mix version)"			4:56
Total length:				72:18

Additional information

- Tracks 13 and 14 on the second disc are live versions recorded in Gothenburg's Musikens Hus during 1998.

== Personnel ==
- Joacim Cans – lead vocals
- Oscar Dronjak – guitars, backing vocals
- Stefan Elmgren – guitars, backing vocals (disc 1 tracks 1–3, 7–15; disc 2 all tracks)
- Fredrik Larsson – bass, backing vocals (disc 1 tracks 1–6; disc 2 tracks 12)
- Anders Johansson – drums (disc 1 tracks 1–3, 10–15; disc 2 all tracks)
- Glenn Ljungström – guitars (disc 1 tracks 4–6)
- Patrik Räfling – drums (disc 1 tracks 4–10; Disc 2 tracks 13–14)
- Magnus Rosén – bass (disc 1 tracks 7–15; Disc 2 tracks 1–11, 13–14)
