= Fullforce =

- Origin: Sweden
- Genres: Power metal, heavy metal
- Years active: 2008–present
- Labels: SPV, Germany.
- Members: Mike Andersson; Stefan Elmgren; Stefan Rosqvist; Anders Johansson; Tommy Larsson
- Website: Fullforce

Fullforce is a Swedish power metal band that formed in late 2008.

== History ==
Fullforce was formed by former HammerFall members Stefan Elmgren and Magnus Rosen and Silent Memorial and Cloudscape singer Mike Andersson in late 2008. On May 27 they announced that current HammerFall drummer Anders Johansson had joined the band. On May 28 they announced that their final member will be Narnia and Beautiful Sin guitar player Carl Johan Grimmark. The band is signed to SPV. In January 2010 it was announced that Magnus Rosen has left the group, due to different reasons. Grimmark left the band and was replaced by Stefan Rosqvist. The band has toured with Edguy and recorded a follow-up to One in the album Next Level (2012).

== Band members ==
=== Current members ===
- Mike Andersson – Vocals (2008–present)
- Stefan Elmgren – Guitar (2008–present)
- Anders Johansson – Drums (2009–present)
- Tommy Larsson - Bass (2010–present)
- Stefan Rosqvist - Guitar (2011–present)

=== Former members ===
- Magnus Rosén – Bass guitar (2008–2010)
- Carl Johan Grimmark – Guitar (2009–2011)

== Discography ==
- One (2011)
- Next Level (2012)
