= One Crimson Night =

Live album & DVD by HammerFall
- Released: 17 October 2003
- Recorded: 20 February 2003; Lisebergshallen, Sweden
- Genre: Power metal, heavy metal
- Length: 59:18 (CD1); 49:20 (CD2); 115 minutes approx. (DVD)
- Label: Nuclear Blast
- Producer: Mikael Thieme, Fredrik Nordström

HammerFall chronology
Crimson Thunder (2002)	One Crimson Night (2003)	Chapter V: Unbent, Unbowed, Unbroken (2005)

Professional ratings
Review scores
Source	Rating
Sea of Tranquility	4.5/5 stars

One Crimson Night is the first live album by Swedish power metal band HammerFall. The album was recorded during band's concert at Lisebergshallen, Sweden. DVD containing this live footage along with bonus materials was released by Nuclear Blast on 29 June 2004.

The cover artwork was created by Samwise Didier.

== Track listing ==
=== DVD ===
1. "Lore of the Arcane"
2. "Riders of the Storm"
3. "Heeding the Call"
4. "Stone Cold"
5. "Hero's Return"
6. "Legacy of Kings"
7. "Bass solo: Magnus Rosén"
8. "At the End of the Rainbow"
9. "The Way of the Warrior"
10. "The Unforgiving Blade"
11. "Glory to the Brave"
12. "Guitar solo: Stefan Elmgren"
13. "Let the Hammer Fall"
14. "Renegade"
15. "Steel Meets Steel"
16. "Crimson Thunder"
17. "Templars of Steel"
18. "Gold Album Award"
19. "Hearts on Fire"
20. "HammerFall"

==== Bonus materials ====
1. On the Road Documentary by Bosse Holmberg
2. Photo Galleries
3. Subtitles

=== Disc one ===
1. "Lore of the Arcane" – 1:44
2. "Riders of the Storm" – 4:54
3. "Heeding the Call" – 5:00
4. "Stone Cold" – 7:10
5. "Hero's Return" – 4:37
6. "Legacy of Kings" – 4:45
7. "Bass solo: Magnus Rosén" – 3:37
8. "At the End of the Rainbow" – 4:33
9. "The Way of the Warrior" – 4:03
10. "The Unforgiving Blade" – 3:49
11. "Glory to the Brave" – 6:35
12. "Guitar solo: Stefan Elmgren" – 2:43
13. "Let the Hammer Fall" – 5:50

=== Disc two ===
1. "Renegade" – 3:54
2. "Steel Meets Steel" – 4:37
3. "Crimson Thunder" – 7:29
4. "Templars of Steel" – 6:10
5. "Hearts on Fire" – 4:03
6. "HammerFall" – 8:24
7. "The Dragon Lies Bleeding" (bonus track) – 5:06
8. "Stronger Than All" (bonus track) – 4:29
9. "A Legend Reborn" (bonus track) – 5:10

== Production ==
- During the post-production of DVD, sound level of the audience who repeats Joacim Cans' vocals and sings with him was lowered so that it looks like there's no response from it. On the CD, however, original sound level is preserved.
- Bonus Tracks #7 and #9 in the CD were recorded in Guadalajara, Mexico. Track #8 recorded in Santiago, Chile.

== Personnel ==
- Joacim Cans – lead vocals
- Oscar Dronjak – guitars, backing vocals
- Stefan Elmgren – guitars, backing vocals
- Magnus Rosén – bass guitar
- Anders Johansson – drums

== Release information ==
- Also released as limited edition (1,000 pieces) box set containing this 2CD, the DVD "One Crimson Night", a flag, backstage pass and a bonus CD with the following track list: Dreamland (live), Joacim's Message, Oscar's Message, Stefan's Message, Magnus' Message, Anders' Message.
