= Beyond the Gates (Joacim Cans album) =

- Cover art by Samwise Didier

Studio album by Joacim Cans
- Released: 19 April 2004
- Recorded: Studio Fredman, Gothenburg, Sweden, Frankie´s Hideaway, North Hollywood, Los Angeles, California, House of Music Studios, Winterbach, Germany; November 2003 - February 2004
- Genre: Heavy metal
- Length: 51:19
- Label: Noise/Sanctuary
- Producer: Joacim Cans, Stefan Elmgren, Charlie Bauerfeind

Beyond the Gates is the first studio album by HammerFall vocalist Joacim Cans and was released in 2004. Samwise Didier, who has done most of the artwork for Hammerfall, made the cover art. Charlie Bauerfeind, who produced many of band's albums, was the producer. Cans bandmates Oscar Dronjak and Stefan Elmgren are also featured on the record. Most of the album was recorded at Studio Fredman in Cans's hometown: Gothenburg, Sweden.

== Track listing ==
No.	Title	Writer(s)	Length
1.	"Fields of Yesterday"	Joacim Cans, Stefan Elmgren	4:46
2.	"Soul Collector"	Cans, Mike Chlasciak	3:38
3.	"Red Light"	Cans, Ronny Milianowicz	4:36
4.	"Back to Hell"	Cans, Chlasciak	3:21
5.	"Beyond the Gates"	Cans, David T. Chastain	5:21
6.	"The Key"	Cans, Milianowicz	4:47
7.	"Garden of Evil"	Cans, Milianowicz	4:27
8.	"Merciless"	Cans, Mat Sinner, Henny Wolter	3:17
9.	"Silent Cries"	Cans, Elmgren	4:09
10.	"Dreams"	Cans, Sinner, Tom Naumann	4:17
11.	"Signs"	Cans, Mikael King	4:21
12.	"Forever Ends"	Jeff Waters, Curran Murphy	4:25

== Personnel ==
Band members

- Joacim Cans - vocals, producer
- "Metal" Mike Chlasciak - lead & rhythm guitars
- Stefan Elmgren - lead & rhythm guitars, keyboards, producer, engineer
- Daniele Soravia - keyboards
- Mat Sinner - bass, backing vocals
- Mark Zonder - drums, engineer

Additional musicians

- Gus G - lead guitar on "Beyond the Gates"
- Danny Gill - lead guitar on "Dreams"
- Oscar Dronjak, Mats Rendlert, Joacim "Lill" Lundberg, Jonatan Nordström, Hilda Lerme, Jenny Gustafsson - backing vocals

Production

- Charlie Bauerfeind - producer, engineer, mixing, mastering
- Achim Kohler - engineer
