= No Sacrifice, No Victory =

Studio album by HammerFall
- Released: 20 February 2009
- Recorded: PAMA Studios, Sweden; Sonic Train Studios, Sweden, June–November 2008
- Genre: Heavy metal, power metal
- Length: 49:39
- Label: Nuclear Blast
- Producer: Charlie Bauerfeind

HammerFall chronology
Masterpieces (2008)	No Sacrifice, No Victory (2009)	Infected (2011)

Singles from No Sacrifice, No Victory
- 1. "Any Means Necessary" Released: 6 February 2009; 2. "My Sharona" Released: 26 April 2009

Professional ratings
Review scores
Source	Rating
AllMusic	3/5 stars
Danger Dog	4.5/5 stars
Lords of Metal	85/100
Metal 1	8.5/10

No Sacrifice, No Victory is the seventh studio album by Swedish power metal band HammerFall, released 20 February 2009. It was partly recorded at PAMA Studios in Torsås and at Andy La Rocque's Sonic Train Studios in Varberg. It is the first album featuring the band's new lead guitarist Pontus Norgren, the return of bassist Fredrik Larsson who played bass from 1994 to 1997, as well as the first to have the band tuning all of their guitars in all songs to D tuning as opposed to the E-flat tuning seen on most songs from all previous albums.

== Track listing ==
No.	Title	Writer(s)	Length
1.	"Any Means Necessary"	Joacim Cans, Oscar Dronjak	3:35
2.	"Life Is Now"	Cans, Dronjak	4:43
3.	"Punish and Enslave"	Cans, Dronjak	3:57
4.	"Legion"	Cans, Dronjak	5:36
5.	"Between Two Worlds"	Dronjak	5:28
6.	"Hallowed Be My Name"	Cans, Dronjak	3:56
7.	"Something for the Ages" (instrumental)	Pontus Norgren, Fredrik Thomander	5:03
8.	"No Sacrifice, No Victory"	Cans, Dronjak	3:31
9.	"Bring the Hammer Down"	Cans, Stefan Elmgren	3:40
10.	"One of a Kind"	Cans, Dronjak, Jesper Strömblad	6:14
11.	"My Sharona" (The Knack cover)	Doug Fieger, Berton Averre	3:56
Total length:			49:39

== Personnel ==
- Joacim Cans – lead vocals
- Oscar Dronjak – guitar, backing vocals
- Pontus Norgren – guitar, backing vocals
- Anders Johansson – drums
- Fredrik Larsson – bass, backing vocals
- Jens Johansson – keyboard solo on "Something for the Ages" and church organ on "Between Two Worlds"
- Stefan Elmgren – additional guitar solo on "Bring the Hammer Down"
- Samwise Didier – cover art

== Song descriptions ==
- Drummer Anders Johansson knew No Sacrifice, No Victory was an important record as it was the first since their debut Glory to the Brave (1997) without the guitarist Stefan Elmgren. But Johansson is confident and explains every song in his own words:

*"Any Means Necessary":

It takes place in the twisted mind of a killer that is on the edge, ticking like a time bomb, 24/7. He sees himself not only as the judge and juror but also as an executor sent from God. It's our first single for this album. It's a mid tempo, sing along-type of song.

- "Life Is Now":

A song about life on the road and the importance about living your life here and now. A triplet feel. It's swinging. My personal favourite. It's interesting and not typical HammerFall. Joacim does a great job here.

- "Punish and Enslave":

A chicken race where the outcome will settle the future of the world. A personal favourite, too. Priest-Accept style. A rocker.

- "Legion":

After giving in to the three temptations, the same temptations that Satan brought to Eve in the Garden of Eden, a man gets possessed by a legion of demons. He is bound to bring destruction and death to this world unless he finds a way to fight the demons and send them back to Hell. A typical HammerFall-song with Double bass and power metal.

- "Between Two Worlds":

It's about a person caught between two worlds, in desperate need of change. A heavy dark ballad and many people's favourite. The organ is played by Jens, my brother, Johansson. The organ was recorded in Timo Kotipelto's kitchen.

- "Hallowed Be My Name":

Banned for something he did not do and cursed for his beliefs, Hector is now bound to walk the earth forever. He finds shelter in the dark night and asks for guidance from the sun and the moon. One thing is clear to him: that no matter what they do they can't take away his true identity and name. A heavy mid tempo song.

- "No Sacrifice, No Victory":

A song about staying true to yourself while fighting for your beliefs. No matter what happens you should sacrifice your own life rather than fighting dirty and losing your pride and glory. A typical trademark HammerFall song in mid trempo.

- "Bring the Hammer Down":

A song about the Heavy Metal genre's rise, fall and powerful return. It also describes the spirit inside every metal fan standing united under one flag and one nation. Stefan and Joacim did this one. A heavy double bass.

- "One of a Kind":

A story about a handful of brave men that dared to stand up and defend their cursed nation. It's never too late to try and make a change. Faster than we ever recorded. Co-written by Jesper Strömblad from In Flames.

== Chart positions ==
Country	Position
Sweden (Rock/Metal)	1
Sweden	2
UK (Rock)	18
UK (Indie)	21
Switzerland	20
Austria	25
Czech Republic	33
Norway	46
Greece	7
Italy	81
Belgium (Flanders)	92
Belgium (Wallonia)	82
France	95
Germany	7
