= Blood Bound (song) =

Single by HammerFall

from the album Chapter V: Unbent, Unbowed, Unbroken
- Released: 28 January 2005
- Recorded: 4 September – 25 October 2004, Lundgård Studios, Denmark; 23 May 2003, Hard Rock Live, Guadalajara, Mexico
- Genre: Power metal, heavy metal
- Length: 13:17
- Label: Nuclear Blast
- Songwriters: Oscar Dronjak; Joacim Cans; Jesper Strömblad
- Producer: Charlie Bauerfeind

HammerFall singles chronology
"Hearts on Fire" (2002)	"Blood Bound" (2005)	"Natural High" (2006)

"Blood Bound" is a song by Swedish power metal band HammerFall, released on January 28, 2005. It was the only single released from their fifth studio album Chapter V: Unbent, Unbowed, Unbroken.

The instrumental/karaoke version on the album was linked with a competition where fans could send their version of "Blood Bound" to Nuclear Blast and win a meet and greet with the members of HammerFall on their shows in April 2005.
The artwork was made by Samwise Didier following an original idea by Joacim Cans and Oscar Dronjak.

== Track listing ==
No.	Title	Writer(s)	Length
1.	"Blood Bound"	Dronjak, Cans	3:50
2.	"Blood Bound" (Instrumental/Karaoke version)	Dronjak, Cans	3:51
3.	"The Metal Age" (live)	Dronjak, Cans, Strömblad	5:36
4.	"Enhanced part"
Total length:			13:17

- Enhanced part contains a screensaver and 3 wallpapers (in .jpg format).
- The track "Blood Bound" was also made into a music video.

== Charts ==
=== Weekly charts ===
Chart (2005)	Peak position
Germany (GfK)	54
Italy (FIMI)	45
Sweden (Sverigetopplistan)	5
Switzerland (Schweizer Hitparade)	85

=== Year-end charts ===
Chart (2005)	Position
Sweden (Sverigetopplistan)	98

== Personnel ==
- Joacim Cans – lead vocals
- Oscar Dronjak – rhythm guitar, backing vocals
- Stefan Elmgren – lead guitar
- Magnus Rosén – bass
- Anders Johansson – drums

== Additional personnel ==
Additional backing vocals by:

- Rolf Köhler
- Olaf Zenkbiel
- Mats Rendlert
- Joacim Lundberg
- Markus Sköld
- Johan Aremyr
