= Shadowside =

Brazilian metal band

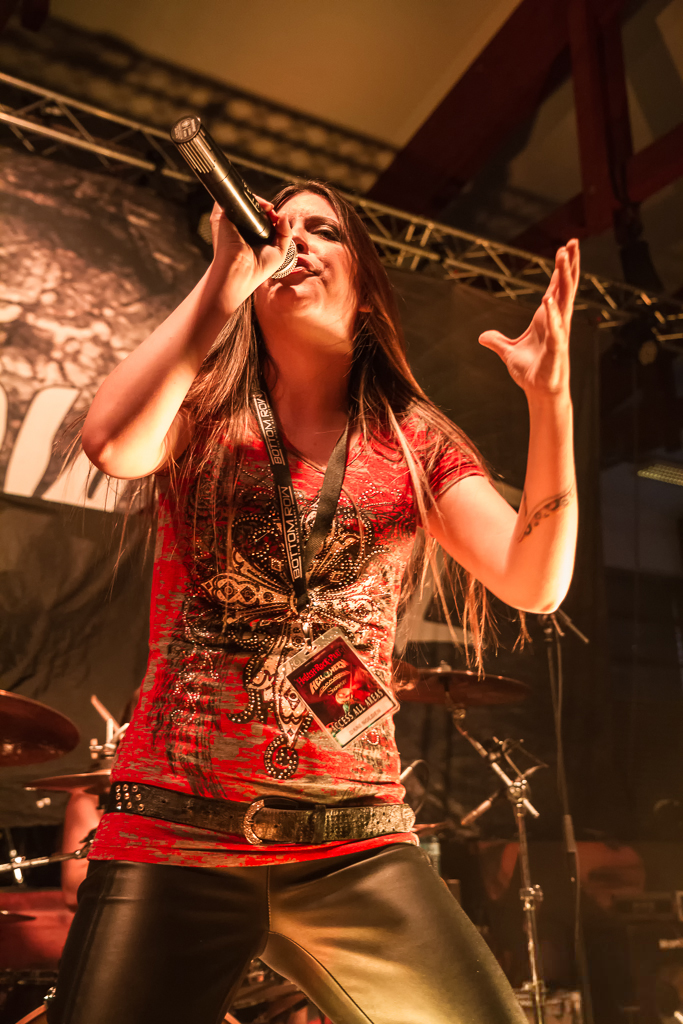
- Shadowside (2013)

Background information
- Genres: Power metal, heavy metal
- Years active: 2001–present
- Members: Dani Nolden; Raphael Mattos; Magnus Rosén; Fabio Buitvidas
- Past members: See below
- Website: shadowside.ws

Shadowside is a Brazilian heavy metal band drawing from influences of thrash and hard rock.

== History ==
Shadowside is a female fronted metal band established in 2001 in Santos, Brazil. The group has played in 30 countries so far, both as a headlining act and as a support act for legendary bands such as Iron Maiden, Helloween and W.A.S.P.

Their discography includes the albums Theatre of Shadows (2007), Dare to Dream (2009), and Inner Monster Out (2011). The latter brought them international notoriety as they reached #9 on CMJ's Loud Rock Charts, remaining in the top 15 most played bands on US radio stations for six weeks in a row, hit #26 in the best-selling album charts in Japan, according to BURRN! Magazine, and won the 11th Annual Independent Music Awards in the Best Hardcore/Metal album category by popular choice.

After the success they enjoyed with Inner Monster Out, Shadowside started working on their fourth studio album. After five years, the band finally returned to Studio Fredman in Sweden, where they had already recorded their previous album, for a marathon 20-day recording session with producers Fredrik Nordström and Henrik Udd, to record their new album, Shades of Humanity (2017).

An additional energy boost for the new album came from Swedish bass player Magnus Rosén (ex-HammerFall), who joined Shadowside in 2015. Not only did he contribute decades' worth of musical experience, but he also wrote two songs with guitarist Andy La Rocque (King Diamond), which appear on the album.

The new album explores deep and controversial subjects such as depression, abortion, stories of overcoming difficulties, the Mariana dam disaster and mankind's moral values, and branches out musically, although never leaving behind the heavy riffs and catchy melodies that have always been their trademark.

Shades of Humanity was released in Europe by EMP Label Group, in Japan by Spiritual Beast in July 2017, and in Brazil in September 2017 by Furia Music Records. 6 October saw the worldwide digital release of the album.

== Albums ==
=== Shades of Humanity (2017) ===
Professional ratings
Review scores
Source	Rating
KNAC.COM	(4.5/5)
Metal At The Gates	(9/10)

1. "The Fall"
2. "Beast Inside"
3. "What If"
4. "Make My Fate"
5. "Insidious Me"
6. "The Crossing"
7. "Stream of Shame"
8. "Parade the Sacrifice"
9. "Drifter"
10. "Unreality"
11. "Alive"
12. "Haunted" (Japan bonus track)

=== Inner Monster Out (2011) ===
Professional ratings
Review scores
Source	Rating
The Metal Critic	(7.3/10)

1. "Gag Order" (4:37)
2. "Angel With Horns" (4:41)
3. "Habitchual" (3:32)
4. "In the Name of Love" (3:49)
5. "Inner Monster Out" (feat. Björn "Speed" Strid, Mikael Stanne, Niklas Isfeldt) (3:48)
6. "I'm Your Mind" (3:25)
7. "My Disrupted Reality" (4:14)
8. "A Smile Upon Death" (3:22)
9. "Whatever Our Fortune" (3:02)
10. "A.D.D." (4:12)
11. "Waste of Life" (3:41)

=== Dare to Dream (2009) ===
1. "Nation Hollow Mind"
2. "In the Night"
3. "Last Thoughts"
4. "Hideaway"
5. "Baby in the Dark"
6. "Ready or Not"
7. "Memories"
8. "Wings of Freedom"
9. "Time to Say Goodbye"
10. "Life Denied"
11. "Dare to Dream"
12. "Everlasting Sun" (European bonus track)
- "Dare to Dream" was produced and mixed by Dave Schiffman and mastered by Howie Weinberg at Masterdisk in New York. The CD's cover was designed by Brazilian artist Jobert Mellow, who previously worked with the band on the American edition of Shadowside's debut album, Theatre of Shadows (2007).

=== Theatre of Shadows (2007) ===
1. "Enter The Shadowside"
2. "Vampire Hunter"
3. "Highlight"
4. "We Want a Miracle"
5. "Illusions"
6. "Queen Of the Sky"
7. "Believe In Yourself"
8. "Tonight"
9. "Kingdom of Life"
10. "Red Storm"
11. "Theatre of Shadows Act 1 Shadow Dance"
12. "Theatre of Shadows Act 2 Here to Stay"
13. "Rainbow In the Dark" (bonus for US)
- The US version from Chavis Records includes a cover of Dio's "Rainbow In the Dark".

== Members ==
=== Current members ===
- Dani Nolden - vocals
- Raphael Mattos - guitar
- Magnus Rosén - bass
- Fabio Buitvidas - drums

=== Past members ===
- Ricardo Piccoli - bass
