= Samwise =

The name Samwise may refer to

- Samwise Gamgee, a fictional character in J. R. R. Tolkien's fantasy world Middle-earth
- Samwise Didier, an artist and Art Director at Blizzard Entertainment
- Samwise, a web-comic from Scott Kurtz
