= Hearts on Fire (HammerFall song) =

Single by HammerFall

from the album Crimson Thunder
- Released: Single: 30 September 2002; DVD: 4 November 2002
- Recorded: May–July 2002 Wisseloord Studios, Netherlands; Twilight Studios, Germany; Mi Sueño, Tenerife; April 2000, JM Studios, Sweden; 4 August 2001, Wacken Open Air, German
- Genre: Power metal
- Length: Single 12:11; DVD 26:32
- Label: Nuclear Blast
- Songwriter(s): Joacim Cans, Oscar Dronjak
- Producer(s): HammerFall, Charlie Bauerfeind, Martin Kronlund

HammerFall singles chronology
"Always Will Be" (2000)	"Hearts on Fire" (2002)	"Blood Bound" (2005)

"Hearts on Fire" is a song by Swedish power metal band HammerFall released as their single on 30 September 2002. It was the only single released from their fourth studio album, Crimson Thunder. It ranked 11th in the Swedish charts and 58th in Germany.

The cover artwork was created by Samwise Didier.

A promotional DVD, also titled Hearts on Fire, was released by Nuclear Blast on 4 November 2002. It ranked 9th in the Swedish charts.

== Track list ==
=== CD ===
From Metal Archives.

No.	Title	Writer(s)	Length
1.	"Hearts On Fire"	Dronjak, Cans	3:53
2.	"We're Gonna Make It" (Twisted Sister cover)	Dee Snider	3:36
3.	"Heeding the Call" (live)	Dronjak, Cans, Strömblad	4:42
4.	"Heeding the Call" (live video CD-ROM)

=== DVD ===
From the song's web page.

No.	Title	Writer(s)	Length
1.	"Hearts On Fire" (video clip)	Dronjak, Cans	3:53
2.	"The Making Of Hearts On Fire"	Dronjak, Cans	3:35
3.	"Heeding the Call" (live)	Dronjak, Cans, Strömblad	4:53
4.	"A Legend Reborn" (video clip)	Dronjak, Cans	5:07
5.	"Always Will Be" (video clip)	Dronjak	4:44
6.	"Renegade" (video clip)	Dronjak, Cans, Strömblad	4:20
Total length:			26:32

- Bonus materials DVD: photo gallery

== Personnel ==
- Joacim Cans – lead vocals
- Oscar Dronjak – rhythm guitar, backing vocals
- Stefan Elmgren – lead guitar
- Magnus Rosén – bass
- Anders Johansson – drums

== Guest performers ==
- Mat Sinner and Rolf Köhler – additional backing vocals on Hearts On Fire (both CD and DVD)

== Release information ==
- An orange 12" vinyl, 12", maxi-single, limited edition was released with three tracks on the LP. On side A; "Hearts on Fire" and on side B; "We're Gonna Make It (Twisted Sister cover) and "Heeding The Call (live)".
- The Japanese release is an enhanced version of the single and came out on 21 September 2002. It has all the tracks from the original release with three additional tracks: "Rising Force" (originally performed by Yngwie Malmsteen), "Templars Of Steel (live)" and "Let The Hammer Fall (live)".
