= The First Crusade (video) =

Video by HammerFall
- Released: 1999
- Genre: Power metal, heavy metal
- Label: Nuclear Blast

The First Crusade is a combination of live performances, video clips, interviews, etc., by Swedish power metal band HammerFall. It was released in Nuclear Blast, first on VHS (9 August 1999) followed by a DVD release (2 February 2000).

== Track listing ==
1. Introduction
2. "Steel Meets Steel"
3. "Glory To The Brave"
4. "HammerFall"
5. Introducing: Magnus Rosen
6. "Steel Meets Steel"
7. "Glory To The Brave"
8. "The Making Of Glory To The Brave"
9. "Ravenlord" (Stormwitch cover)
10. "The Metal Age"
11. Nominated For The Swedish Grammy Award
12. "Stone Cold"
13. "Listening Session"
14. "German TV Advertisement"
15. "Releaseparty For Legacy Of Kings"
16. "Head Over Heels"
17. "Balls to the Wall" (Accept cover)
18. "Breaking The Law" (Judas Priest cover)
19. Outtakes and Sign Off

== Personnel ==
- Joacim Cans – Lead and Backing Vocals
- Oscar Dronjak – Guitar and Backing Vocals
- Stefan Elmgren – Guitar
- Magnus Rosén – Bass Guitar
- Patrik Räfling – Drums

== Information ==
- Tracks 1, 5, 13, 15 and in-between-segments skits filmed and directed by Roger Johansson.
- Track 2 recorded live at Flunsåsparken, Gothenburg, Sweden, 11 May 1996.
- Track 3, 4 produced, filmed and directed by Alfonso Ågren.
- Track 6 recorded live at Down Under, Gothenburg, Sweden, 27 June 1997. Filmed by Parick Nordqvist.
- Track 7 and 8 produced by Roxanne Film, directed by Thomas Wolff.
- Track 9 recorded live at Bang Your Head II, Stefan Hartmannhalle, Tübingen, Germany, 14 September 1997.
- Track 10 recorded live at Musikens Hus, Gothenburg, Sweden, 30 January 1998. Filmed and directed by Roger Johansson.
- Track 12 recorded live at Dynamo Open Air, Endhoven, Holland, 30 May 1998. Produced by Van Wingarden Produktion, directed by Thomas Wolff.
- Tracks 16–19 recorded live at Kåren, Göteborg Sweden, 19 September 1998. Filmed and directed by Roger Johansson.
- Track 20 taken from Metal Warriors video magazine, Australia.

== Additional information ==
- Track 2: featuring Jesper Strömblad, Fredrik Larsson and Glenn Ljungström.
- Track 9: featuring Andy Mück.
- Track 16: featuring Udo Dirkschneider.
- Track 17: featuring Udo Dirkschneider and Mikkey Dee.
