= Hammer of Dawn =

Hammer of Dawn may refer to:

- Hammer of Dawn (album): a 2022 album by the rock band, HammerFall
- Hammer of Dawn, a fictitious orbital weaponry system in the Gears of War video game series
