= Blood Bound =

Blood Bound may refer to:

- Bloodbound, a Swedish power metal band
- "Blood Bound" (song), a song by HammerFall
