= Samwise Didier =

American video game art director (born 1971)

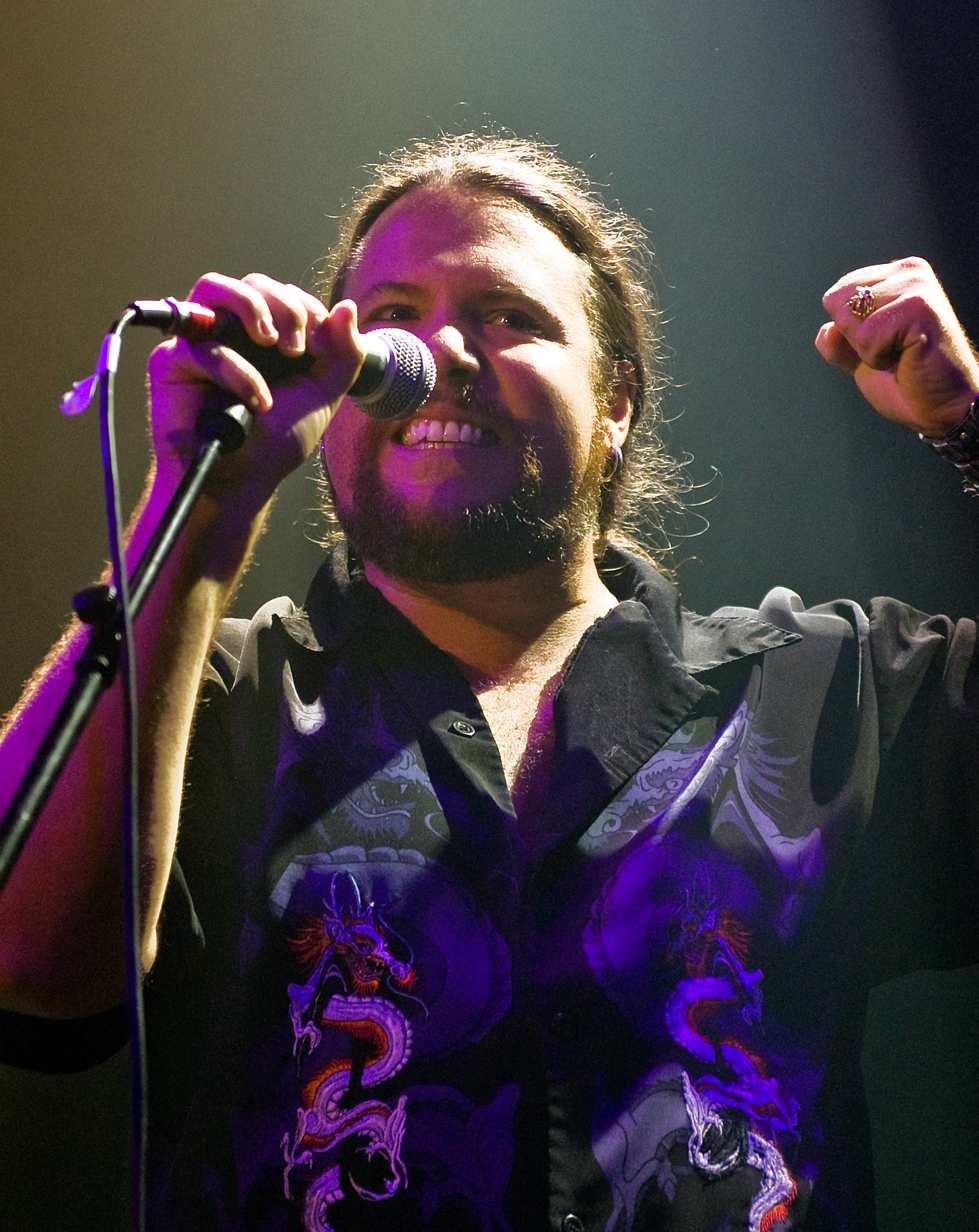
- Didier at BlizzCon 2009
- Born: 1971 (age 54–55); Tustin, California, U.S.
- Occupations: Artist, designer

Sam "Samwise" Didier (born 1971) is an American artist. He served as senior art director at Blizzard Entertainment, having been with the company since 1991. As the art director for the flagship games of the Warcraft, StarCraft, and Diablo franchises, the producer of several games, and an artistic contributor to almost every game released under the name Blizzard Entertainment, Didier has created a distinctive Blizzard house style. Edge described Didier's style as "a striking, pulp sensibility that may be an acquired taste, but one acquirable on either side of the Pacific, side-stepping polarisation of appeal to either eastern or western audiences." His other contributions to Blizzard projects include writing, voice acting, music, sculpture, the Pandaren species, and the name "Warcraft". Leonardo Marcato calls him "one of the game designers that can be legitimately called authors thanks to the imprint they gave to projects they directed."

In addition to his work at Blizzard, Didier has written and illustrated novels, released an illustration guide, and created album cover art.

== Blizzard ==
Didier joined Blizzard (then called "Silicon & Synapse") in 1991 when he saw a newspaper ad that only read, "'make art for video games.' Very descriptive. I think a programmer wrote it." He has worked there continuously since. "I've never worked for another game company," he said in a 2012 interview. "I never want to. I'm going down with the ship." His early work appeared in The Lost Vikings, Blackthorne, and Warcraft I. As well as continuing to contribute in-game and manual artwork, he took on increased responsibility in following Blizzard releases: he was a producer for The Death and Return of Superman and Justice League Task Force, an art director and producer for Warcraft II, an art director for Diablo, The Lost Vikings 2, StarCraft, Warcraft III, and Starcraft II, and a concept writer for Warcraft III: Reign of Chaos. As a voice actor, he performed in Warcraft III, World of Warcraft, and Heroes of the Storm. He was credited with additional contributions to Diablo II, Diablo III, and Overwatch.

Didier's work intentionally invokes the spirit of pulp magazines and comic books. "We haven't changed our style since the very beginning," he said in 2004. "The first orc we ever did, in Blackthorne was just a little guy chasing after Blackthorne — but we thought, 'Hey, these guys are cool,' so we used that character for our orcs in WarCraft. Artistically, we've always gone for the same sort of goals: we try to keep everything over-the-top, over-proportioned, and really colorful, then we add in as much 'comic factor' as we can."

The Pandaren race in the Warcraft universe are also a Didier creation, a result of his personal enthusiasm for pandas. Among other things, panda icons also appeared accompanying much of Didier's art, and could be seen in Warcraft III as the emblem on the Night Elf demon hunter's glaives, his name is written in the Paladin's book, when he casts a spell, and an unused Icon and two Models have the face of Didier's face, visible only in the Map Editor. In Starcraft II there is a multiplayer portrait, containing a "Panda Marine".

On November 10, 2023, Didier announced his retirement from Blizzard via X, after 32 years with the company. Signing off with 'Always draw big shoulder pads'.

== Music ==
Swedish heavy metal band HammerFall frequently turned to Didier for album covers from 2002 to 2009. Didier created the album covers for all of their studio albums in this period (Crimson Thunder, One Crimson Night, Chapter V: Unbent, Unbowed, Unbroken, Threshold, and No Sacrifice, No Victory) as well as for five other releases (the 2002 EP Hearts on Fire, the 2005 EP Blood Bound, the 2006 EP Natural High, the 2011 single Send Me A Sign, and the 2014 single Bushido). Didier also created the cover art for HammerFall lead vocalist Joacim Cans' 2004 solo album Beyond the Gates.

Didier is the lead vocalist for Elite Tauren Chieftain (ETC), a band composed of Blizzard employees. ETC has performed at several BlizzCons, playing songs based on Blizzard games. In addition their appearances in Blizzard games, their song "I Am Murloc" was released as DLC for Guitar Hero III. In turn, the Heroes of the Storm character E.T.C. is based on the band, as well as the Hearthstone cards E.T.C., God of Metal and Elite Tauren Chieftain.

== Writing ==
In 2017, Didier published an illustrated book of short stories, Grimbeard: Tales of the Last Dwarf.

He is the author of the fantasy novels The Last Winter (solo) and Strange Highways (as co-author to Micky Neilson), as well as an illustration guide, How to Draw Mythical Monsters and Magical Creatures. Several Blizzard art books also include commentary from him.

== Bibliography ==
Year	Title	Role	Publisher
2002	The Art of Warcraft	Artist	Brady Games
2005	The Art of World of Warcraft	Artist	Brady Games
2006	The Art of World of Warcraft: The Burning Crusade	Artist	Brady Games
2007	World of Warcraft: The Art of the Trading Card Game	Author, artist	Chronicle Books
2008	The Art of World of Warcraft: Wrath of the Lich King	Artist	Insight Editions
2009	The Cinematic Art of World of Warcraft: The Wrath of the Lich King	Artist	Insight Editions
2010	The Art of StarCraft II: Wings of Liberty	Artist	Insight Editions
2012	The Art of World of Warcraft: Mists of Pandaria	Author, artist	Insight Editions
2013	The Art of Blizzard Entertainment	Author, artist	Insight Editions
2017	Grimbeard: Tales of The Last Dwarf	Author, illustrator	Insight Editions
2017	The Last Winter	Author, illustrator	Insight Editions
2019	How to Draw Mythical Monsters and Magical Creatures	Author, illustrator	Thunder Bay Press
2019	Strange Highways	Author, illustrator	Simon & Schuster
2020	Brutal: The Art of Samwise	Author, illustrator	Cernunnos
