= Threshold (album) =

Studio album by HammerFall
- Released: 18 October 2006
- Recorded: 2006, Lundgård Studios, Denmark
- Genre: Power metal, heavy metal
- Length: 50:30
- Label: Nuclear Blast
- Producer: Charlie Bauerfeind

HammerFall chronology
Chapter V: Unbent, Unbowed, Unbroken (2005)	Threshold (2006)	Steel Meets Steel: Ten Years of Glory (2007)

Singles from Threshold
- 1. "The Fire Burns Forever" Released: 6 August – 6 September 2006; 2. "Natural High" Released: 22 September 2006

Professional ratings
Review scores
Source	Rating
AllMusic	3/5 stars

Threshold is the sixth studio album by Swedish power metal band HammerFall, released on 18 October 2006. The album entered the Swedish charts at number one, staying on the chart for eight weeks. It was the band's first number 1 album since Renegade in 2000. It is currently the last HammerFall studio album with guitarist Stefan Elmgren and bassist Magnus Rosén, as Rosén left the band in 2007 and Elmgren left in 2008.

The guitar solo of "Howlin' With the 'Pac" is essentially a reworked version of the one from "Hearts on Fire". As with several songs on the previous album, the song "Dark Wings, Dark Words" is inspired by A Song of Ice and Fire. The cover artwork was created by Samwise Didier.

== Track listing ==
No.	Title	Writer(s)	Length
1.	"Threshold"	Oscar Dronjak, Joacim Cans	4:45
2.	"The Fire Burns Forever"	Dronjak, Cans	3:22
3.	"Rebel Inside"	Dronjak	5:34
4.	"Natural High"	Dronjak, Cans	4:16
5.	"Dark Wings, Dark Words"	Dronjak, Cans	5:02
6.	"Howlin' With the 'Pac"	Dronjak, Cans	4:06
7.	"Shadow Empire"	Dronjak, Cans, Stefan Elmgren	5:15
8.	"Carved in Stone"	Dronjak, Cans	6:13
9.	"Reign of the Hammer"	Elmgren	2:50
10.	"Genocide"	Dronjak, Cans, Elmgren	4:43
11.	"Titan"	Dronjak, Cans	4:24
Total length:			50:30

== Music videos ==
- The song "Natural High" was made into a music video depicting Hector the Knight battling vampires in a decrepit castle; he managed to kill most of the vampires with his hammer, but one of them escapes, leaving Hector by himself. The video itself is a montage alternating between the band and the action, which is shot in live-action and complemented with CGI.
- The song "The Fire Burns Forever" was also made into a music video. The band recorded it with some of the Swedish participants in the European Athletics Championships.

== Single "The Fire Burns Forever" ==
"The Fire Burns Forever" was also released as a single and only available as a download between 6 August and 6 September 2006, exclusively at the ITunes Store and Nuclear Blast Musicshop. Hammerfall and the athletes also performed "The Fire Burns Forever" at the official opening of the Championships on 6 August in Gothenburg, Sweden.

== Personnel ==
- Joacim Cans – lead vocals
- Oscar Dronjak – lead and rhythm guitar, backing vocals, keyboards, programming
- Stefan Elmgren – lead and rhythm guitar, backing vocals, keyboards, programming
- Magnus Rosén – bass
- Anders Johansson – drums

Backing vocals by Oliver Hartmann, Rolf Köhler, Olaf Zenkbiel, Mats Rendlert, Joacim Lundberg, Markus Sköld, and Johan Aremyr

== Chart positions ==
- Sweden: #1
- Germany: #15
- Austria: #30
- Switzerland: #32
- France: #192
