= Magnus Rosén =

Swedish bass guitarist

Klas Magnus Rosén (born 1963 in Gothenburg) is a Swedish musician. He was the bassist of Swedish band HammerFall from 1997 to 2007.

Magnus Rosén started to play bass when he was 15 years old. after playing bass for three years he went on his first tour with the band Kung Sune. After the tour he moved to Los Angeles, where he played in many bands. Returning to Sweden he joined Billionaires Boys Club, where his future HammerFall bandmate, Anders Johansson, played drums. The band also featured ex-Accept guitarist Jörg Fischer and Yngwie Malmsteen's onetime vocalists Mark Boals and Göran Edman.

Magnus is also a solo bassist, and recorded several albums of solo material. He occasionally does solo tours in South America, where he donates the profits to charity.

In 2007 Magnus left Hammerfall to focus on his own projects.

In 2008 Rosén was a member of the X-World 5. The group consisted of producer/composer Stefan "Big Swede" Svensson, Andy LaRocque, Reeves Gabrels and Nils K. Rue. Together they recorded one experimental album, called New Universal Order.

In November 2009, Magnus joined ex-Stratovarius guitarist Timo Tolkki's new band Revolution Renaissance.

Rosén played with Black Sabbath vocalist Tony Martin's live band, Tony Martin's Headless Cross. The band played their debut show on 27 July 2012 at The Asylum in Birmingham, UK.

In 2015, Rosén was announced as the new bassist for Brazilian heavy metal band Shadowside. In 2017, he also joined Spanish band Avalanch

Rosén also played with Joe Lynn Turner in 2017 on a Scandinavian tour.

Rosén is also a member of The Senior Management, featuring Göran Edman, Henrik Zetterlund and Dennis Heltorp.

== Discography ==
=== Solo ===
- Imagine a Place (2001)
- Reminiscence (2002)
- Empty Room (2003)
- Arose (2006)
- Set Me Free (2007)
- Past Future (2010)
- Empower Duo (2012)
- Art With Bass (2013)
- Bass For Relax (2013)

=== Hammerfall ===
- Legacy of Kings (1998)
- Heeding the Call (1998) - EP
- I Want Out (1999) - EP
- The First Crusade (1999) - VHS and DVD
- Renegade (2000) - single
- Renegade (2000)
- Always Will Be (2001) - single
- The Templar Renegade Crusades (2002) - VHS and DVD
- Hearts on Fire (2002) - single
- Crimson Thunder (2002)
- One Crimson Night (2004) - CD and DVD
- Blood Bound (2005) - single
- Chapter V: Unbent, Unbowed, Unbroken (2005)
- Threshold (2006)

=== Avalanch ===
- El Ángel Caído 2017 (2017)
- Hacia La Luz - Directo desde Madrid (2018)

=== Shadowside ===
- Shades of Humanity (2017)

=== The Senior Management ===
- Heart & Soul (2018)

=== Other ===
- Shame - Shame (1980)
- Kung Sune - Sunes bar och grill (1982)
- Von Rosen - Like a Dream (1987)
- Von Rosen - Someone Like You (1988)
- Billionaires Boys Club - Something Wicked Comes (1993)
- Keegan - Mind No Mind (1995)
- Jorn - Out to Every Nation (2004)
- X-World/5 - New Universal Order (2008)
- Revolution Renaissance - Trinity (2010)
- Bleckhorn - Dragonfire (2018)
