= Chapter V: Unbent, Unbowed, Unbroken =

Studio album by HammerFall
- Released: 4 March 2005
- Recorded: Lundgård Studios, Denmark
- Genre: Power metal, heavy metal
- Length: 50:44
- Label: Nuclear Blast
- Producer: Charlie Bauerfeind

HammerFall chronology
One Crimson Night (2003)	Chapter V: Unbent, Unbowed, Unbroken (2005)	Threshold (2006)

Singles from Chapter V: Unbent, Unbowed, Unbroken
- 1. "Blood Bound" Released: 28 January 2005

Professional ratings
Review scores
Source	Rating
AllMusic	4/5 stars
Sea of Tranquility	4.5/5 stars
Metal Perspective	9/10 stars

Chapter V: Unbent, Unbowed, Unbroken is the fifth studio album by Swedish power metal band HammerFall, released in 2005 through Nuclear Blast. It features the track "Knights of the 21st Century", which includes guest vocals from Venom frontman Conrad "Cronos" Lant; it is also the band's longest studio recording to date with a length of 10:25, though after 1 minute and 40 seconds of silence, at 12:05, there is an outtake from Cronos.

The album's title was inspired by the family motto of the fictional House Martell of Dorne from the fantasy novel series A Song of Ice and Fire by George R. R. Martin, as were the names of the songs "Hammer of Justice", "Take the Black" and "Fury of the Wild". The lyric "Nothing burns like the cold" from "Never, Ever" is taken from the first chapter of A Game of Thrones, the first book in the series.

The cover artwork was created by Samwise Didier.

== Track listing ==
No.	Title	Writer(s)	Length
1.	"Secrets"	Oscar Dronjak, Joacim Cans	6:06
2.	"Blood Bound"	Dronjak, Cans	3:49
3.	"Fury of the Wild"	Dronjak, Cans	4:44
4.	"Hammer of Justice"	Dronjak, Cans	4:37
5.	"Never, Ever"	Dronjak	4:05
6.	"Born to Rule"	Dronjak, Cans, Stefan Elmgren	4:08
7.	"The Templar Flame"	Dronjak, Cans	3:41
8.	"Imperial"	Dronjak	2:29
9.	"Take the Black"	Dronjak, Cans	4:46
10.	"Knights of the 21st Century"	Dronjak, Cans	12:19
Total length:			50:44

== Personnel ==
- Joacim Cans – lead vocals
- Oscar Dronjak – guitars, backing vocals, keyboards, acoustic guitar on "Imperial"
- Stefan Elmgren – guitars, backing vocals, acoustic guitar on "Never, Ever"
- Magnus Rosén – bass
- Anders Johansson – drums

=== Additional musicians ===
- Conrad "Cronos" Lant (from Venom) – infernal voice on "Knights of the 21st Century"
- Patrick Benzer – keyboards; additional keyboard programming
- Martin Meyer – clavinet on "Secrets"
- Rolf Köhler, Olaf Zenkbiel, Mats Rendlert, Joacim Lundberg, Markus Sköld, Johan Aremyr – additional backing vocals

== Charts ==
Country	Peak position
France	159
Hungary	11
Germany	12
Finland	18
UK (Rock/Metal)	25
Austria	36
Switzerland	39
Sweden	4
Italy	71

== Release information ==
- "The Metal Age" was included as a bonus track on the Brazilian release.
- The album was also released as limited and numbered boxset (1,000 copies) containing the limited edition CD in a metal box, two HammerFall glasses, a HammerFall scarf and a certificate.
- The limited metal box CD is available separately (10,000 copies) and includes an enhanced part: "Blood Bound" (video clip) and Making of "Blood Bound" (video).
- The limited edition digipack includes an enhanced part: "Blood Bound" (video clip) and Picture Gallery, as well as a blue coin with the HammerFall logo on it.
