= Crimson Thunder =

Studio album by HammerFall
- Released: 28 October 2002
- Recorded: Wisseloord Studios (Netherlands), Twilight Studios (Germany), and Mi Sueño (Spain)
- Genre: Power metal, heavy metal
- Length: 47:33
- Label: Nuclear Blast
- Producer: Charlie Bauerfeind

HammerFall chronology
Renegade (2000)	Crimson Thunder (2002)	One Crimson Night (2003)

Singles from Crimson Thunder
- 1. "Hearts on Fire" Released: 30 September 2002

Professional ratings
Review scores
Source	Rating
AllMusic	4/5 stars

Crimson Thunder is the fourth studio album by Swedish power metal band HammerFall. It was the first album the band worked on with producer Charlie Bauerfeind.

The cover art was created by Samwise Didier, who is also known for his Warcraft concept art pieces.

A music video was made for the song "Hearts on Fire".

== Track listing ==
No.	Title	Writer(s)	Length
1.	"Riders of the Storm"	Oscar Dronjak, Joacim Cans	4:34
2.	"Hearts on Fire"	Dronjak, Cans	3:51
3.	"On the Edge of Honour"	Dronjak, Cans	4:49
4.	"Crimson Thunder"	Dronjak, Cans	5:05
5.	"Lore of the Arcane" (Instrumental)	Dronjak	1:27
6.	"Trailblazers"	Dronjak, Cans	4:39
7.	"Dreams Come True"	Dronjak	4:02
8.	"Angel of Mercy" (Chastain cover)	David T. Chastain	5:38
9.	"The Unforgiving Blade"	Dronjak, Cans	3:40
10.	"In Memoriam" (Instrumental)	Stefan Elmgren	4:21
11.	"Hero's Return"	Dronjak, Cans	5:22
Total length:			47:33

European and Brazilian edition bonus track
No.	Title	Length
12.	"Rising Force" (Yngwie Malmsteen cover)	4:30
Total length:		52:03

American bonus track
No.	Title	Length
12.	"Detroit Rock City" (Kiss cover)	3:56
Total length:		51:29

Japanese bonus tracks
No.	Title	Length
12.	"Crazy Nights" (Loudness cover)	3:38
13.	"Renegade" (Live)	4:53
14.	"HammerFall" (Live)	9:13
Total length:		65:17

== Release information ==
- Digipak CD, LP, shaped CD, picture LP, comic book edition, leather bound comic book edition, DVD-audio, value box (with "Hearts on Fire" CDS), Gold Award edition.
- Limited Gold Edition comes in an amaray (DVD-box), including printed HammerFall signatures, golden HammerFall-plectrum, a bonus track ("Heeding the Call" – live) and a videoclip ("Hearts on Fire").
- Strictly limited Enhanced Gold-Award Edition, issued in DVD case with gold CD and band logo plectrum. The CD has all bandmembers' signatures.
- Special Comic Edition has a CD of Crimson Thunder housed in an oversize hardback comic book, with an original comic story and the album's original liner notes/lyrics. Strictly Limited CD & Comicbook with 25 pages comic + 7 pages booklet, hardcover size A4 and the bonus track "Rising Force".
- DVD-Audio comes in 5.1 Dolby Surround Multichannel Sound. Playable on all DVD Players and with a 5.1 Channel Surround Sound System and has a "Hearts on Fire" videoclip.
- There has also been a numbered (1000 have been made) limited edition 3 CD longform leather digibook, that contains two 3-inch mini-CDs with one track on each: "Crazy Nights" (Loudness cover) and "Detroit Rock City" (Kiss cover).

== Chart ranking ==
Country	Ranked
Switzerland	83
Germany	13
Austria	65
France	134
Sweden	3

== Personnel ==
- Joacim Cans – lead vocals
- Oscar Dronjak – guitars, backing vocals
- Stefan Elmgren – guitars, acoustic guitar, backing vocals
- Magnus Rosén – bass
- Anders Johansson – drums
