= Hammer of Dawn (album) =

Studio album by HammerFall
- Released: 25 February 2022
- Genre: Power metal; heavy metal
- Length: 45:50
- Label: Napalm
- Producer: Oscar Dronjak; Pontus Norgren; Fredrik Nordström; Jacob Hansen

HammerFall chronology
Dominion (2019)	Hammer of Dawn (2022)	Avenge the Fallen (2024)

Singles from Hammer of Dawn
- 1. "Hammer of Dawn" Released: 1 December 2021; 2. "Venerate Me" Released: 20 January 2022; 3. "Brotherhood" Released: 23 February 2022

Hammer of Dawn is the twelfth studio album by Swedish power metal band HammerFall. The album was released on 25 February 2022 through Napalm Records. It was produced by Oscar Dronjak, Pontus Norgren, Fredrik Nordström and Jacob Hansen.

Professional ratings
Review scores
Source	Rating
Blabbermouth.net	8/10
Distorted Sound	8/10
Louder Sound	3.5/5 stars
Rock Sins	6/10

== Track listing ==
All tracks are written by HammerFall

Hammer of Dawn track listing
No.	Title	Length
1.	"Brotherhood"	4:40
2.	"Hammer of Dawn"	4:02
3.	"No Son of Odin"	4:00
4.	"Venerate Me"	4:43
5.	"Reveries"	4:45
6.	"Too Old to Die Young"	5:07
7.	"Not Today"	5:41
8.	"Live Free or Die"	3:51
9.	"State of the W.I.L.D."	4:52
10.	"No Mercy"	4:04
Total length:		45:50

== Personnel ==
Credits adapted from Discogs.

HammerFall

- Joacim Cans – lead vocals
- Oscar Dronjak – guitars, backing vocals
- Pontus Norgren – guitars, backing vocals
- Fredrik Larsson – bass
- David Wallin – drums

Additional personnel

- Fredrik Nordström – mixing, mastering, drum production, guitar co-production, bass co-production, recording
- Jacob Hansen – vocal production, recording
- Oscar Dronjak – guitar co-production, bass co-production
- Pontus Norgren – guitar co-production, bass co-production, recording
- Samwise Didier – cover, artwork
- Thomas Ewerhard – layout
- Tallee Savage – photography
