= Stefan Elmgren =

Swedish musician

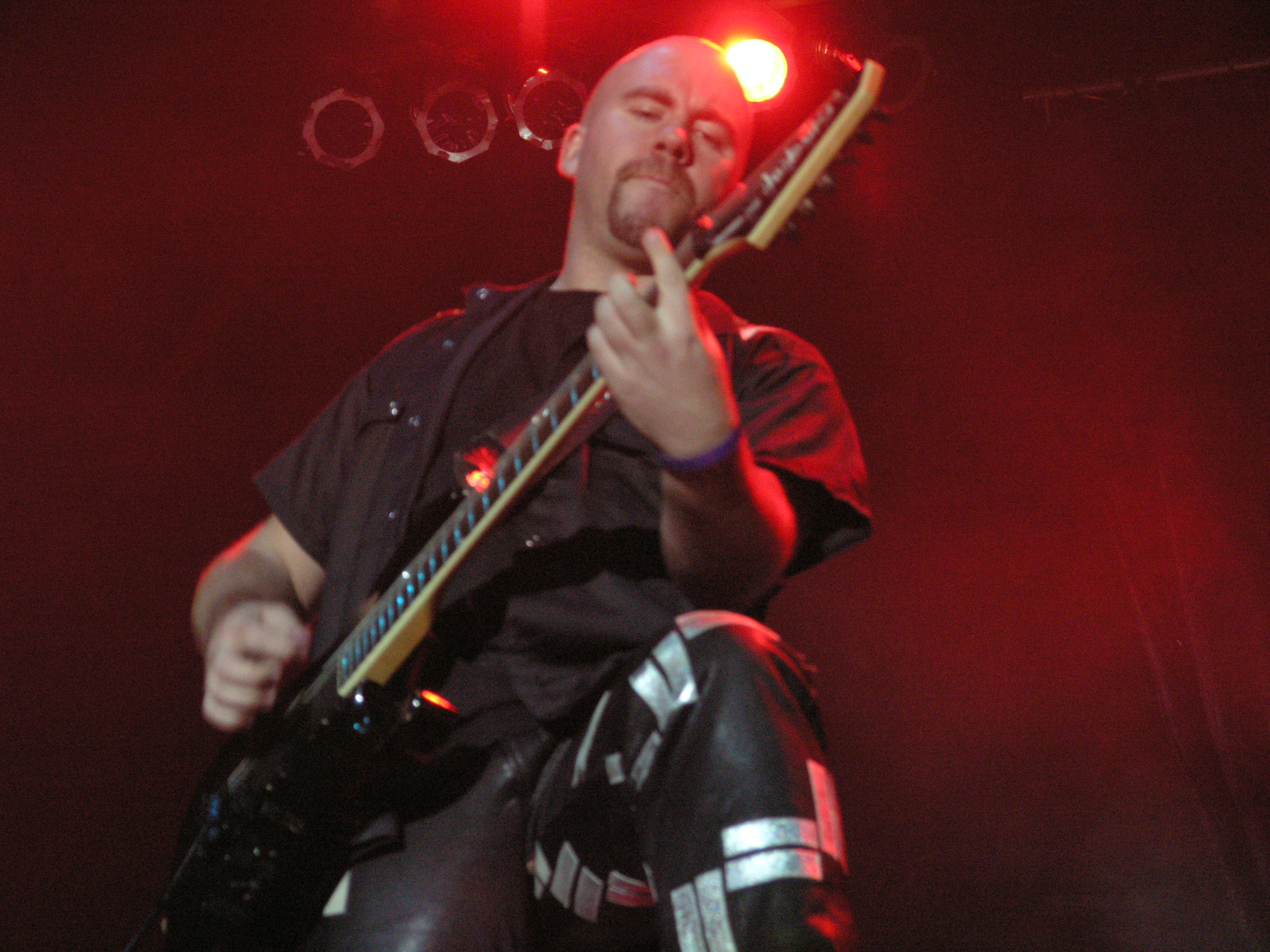
Stefan Elmgren during Hammerfall concert on Masters of Rock 2007 festival.

Stefan Elmgren (born 17 May 1974) is the former guitarist of the Swedish power metal band HammerFall from 1997 to 2008.

== History ==
Before becoming a member of HammerFall, he was the guitarist in the band Highlander. Elmgren has also worked with his solo project Full Strike and released one album called We Will Rise which was released in 2002. Stefan also plays the guitar in Joacim Cans' solo project Cans.

He quit the band in 2008 to put more energy into his career as a pilot. He currently plays with Full Force.

In 2014, it was announced that Elmgren would temporarily return to HammerFall, playing bass guitar while regular bass player Fredrik Larsson was on paternity leave.

== Discography ==
=== With HammerFall ===
- 1998 – Legacy of Kings
- 1999 – The First Crusade (DVD)
- 2000 – Renegade
- 2002 – Crimson Thunder
- 2002 – The Templar Renegade Crusades (DVD)
- 2002 – Hearts on Fire (DVD)
- 2003 – One Crimson Night (live album, DVD)
- 2005 – Chapter V: Unbent, Unbowed, Unbroken
- 2006 – Threshold
- 2007 – Steel Meets Steel - Ten Years of Glory (Best Of)
- 2008 – Masterpieces (cover album)
- 2008 – Rebels with a Cause – Unruly, Unrestrained, Uninhibited (DVD)

=== With Full Strike ===
- 2002 – We Will Rise

=== With CANS ===
- 2004 – Beyond the Gates

=== With Fullforce ===
- 2011 – One
- 2012 – Next Level
