= Renegade (HammerFall album) =

Studio album by HammerFall
- Released: 9 October 2000
- Recorded: April–June 2000
- Studio: WireWorld (Nashville, Tennessee)
- Genre: Power metal, heavy metal
- Length: 46:40
- Label: Nuclear Blast
- Producer: Michael Wagener

HammerFall chronology
Legacy of Kings (1998)	Renegade (2000)	Crimson Thunder (2002)

Singles from Renegade
- 1. "Renegade" Released: 21 August 2000; 2. "Always Will Be" Released: 9 April 2001

Professional ratings
Review scores
Source	Rating
AllMusic	4/5 stars

Renegade is the third studio album by Swedish power metal band HammerFall. It was released on 9 October 2000 on the Nuclear Blast label and is the first album to feature drummer Anders Johansson. Former drummer of HammerFall and founder of heavy metal band In Flames Jesper Strömblad still wrote some of the album's songs, even after parting ways with the band in 1997. The album debuted on the Swedish charts at number one and was eventually awarded a gold certification.

It includes a cover version of the 1983 Accept song "Head over Heels" (from their album Balls to the Wall).

The song "Renegade" reached 89th in the German charts and scored 17th in Sweden. "Always Will Be" ranked 50th in the Swedish music charts.

== Track listing ==
No.	Title	Writer(s)	Length
1.	"Templars of Steel"	Dronjak, Cans	5:24
2.	"Keep the Flame Burning"	Dronjak, Cans, Strömblad	4:39
3.	"Renegade"	Dronjak, Cans, Strömblad	4:21
4.	"Living in Victory"	Dronjak, Cans, Strömblad	4:42
5.	"Always Will Be"	Dronjak	4:49
6.	"The Way of the Warrior"	Dronjak, Cans, Strömblad	4:06
7.	"Destined for Glory"	Dronjak, Cans	5:09
8.	"The Champion"	Dronjak, Cans, Strömblad	4:56
9.	"Raise the Hammer" (Instrumental)	Dronjak, Elmgren	3:22
10.	"A Legend Reborn"	Dronjak, Cans	5:12
Total length:			46:40

Russian edition bonus tracks

No.	Title	Writer(s)	Length
11.	"Run with the Devil" (Heavy Load cover)	S. Wlashquist	3:35
12.	"Head Over Heels" (Accept cover - feat. Udo Dirkschneider)	Accept, Deaffy	4:30
Total length:			54:45

Digipak and Brazilian edition bonus tracks

No.	Title	Writer(s)	Length
11.	"Head Over Heels" (Accept cover - feat. Udo Dirkschneider)	Accept, Deaffy	4:30
12.	"Breaking the Law" (Judas Priest cover)	Tipton, Downing, Halford	2:14
13.	"I Want Out" (Helloween cover)	Hansen	4:38
14.	"Man on the Silver Mountain" (Rainbow cover)	Blackmore, Dio	3:26
15.	"Run with the Devil" (Heavy Load cover)	S. Wlashquist	3:35
16.	"Always Will Be" (Acoustic Version)	Dronjak	4:47
Total length:			69:50

== Music videos ==
- The band created a music video for "Always Will Be".
- The track "Renegade" was also made into a music video.

== Chart positions ==
Country	Ranked
Switzerland	72
Germany	17
Austria	43
Finland	34
Sweden	1

== Credits ==
- Joacim Cans – lead vocals
- Oscar Dronjak – guitars, backing vocals
- Stefan Elmgren – guitars, backing vocals
- Magnus Rosén – bass
- Anders Johansson – drums
- Jamie Simmons, Paul Simmons, John Alexander – additional backing vocals on "Destined for Glory"

Recording

- Recorded at WireWorld Studios in Nashville, Tennessee, April–June 2000.
- Produced, recorded, engineered and mixed by Michael Wagener.
- Mastered by Eric Conn.
- Harley-Davidson sound on "Renegade" provided by Promise Breakers Motorcycle Club Nashville.

Art

- Front and back cover artwork by Andreas Marschall and logo designs by Per Stålfors.
- Following original ideas by Joacim Cans and Oscar Dronjak.
- Photos by Michael Johansson.
