= Legacy of Kings =

Studio album by HammerFall
- Released: 28 September 1998
- Recorded: April–June 1998 Studio Fredman, Gothenburg, Sweden
- Genre: Power metal, heavy metal
- Length: 45:07
- Label: Nuclear Blast
- Producer: Fredrik Nordström & Oscar Dronjak

HammerFall chronology
Glory to the Brave (1997)	Legacy of Kings (1998)	Renegade (2000)

Singles from Legacy of Kings
- 1. "Heeding the Call" Released: 3 August 1998; 2. "I Want Out" Released: 2 August 1999

Professional ratings
Review scores
Source	Rating
AllMusic	link

Legacy of Kings is the second studio album by Swedish power metal band HammerFall. It was released on 28 September 1998 by Nuclear Blast.
The enhanced CD release includes the music video for the track "Let the Hammer Fall", a photo gallery, lyrics for the songs, PC wallpapers, a screensaver, and a Winamp skin only on the Bonus Deluxe Edition. The cover art for this album was painted by Andreas Marschall.

In 2019, Metal Hammer ranked it as the 9th best power metal album of all time.

== Track listing ==
No.	Title	Writer(s)	Length
1.	"Heeding the Call"	Oscar Dronjak, Joacim Cans, Jesper Strömblad	4:30
2.	"Legacy of Kings"	Dronjak, Cans, Strömblad	4:13
3.	"Let the Hammer Fall"	Dronjak, Cans, Strömblad	4:16
4.	"Dreamland"	Dronjak, Cans, Strömblad	5:42
5.	"Remember Yesterday"	Dronjak, Cans, Strömblad	5:05
6.	"At the End of the Rainbow"	Andy Mück, Dronjak, Cans	4:05
7.	"Back to Back" (Pretty Maids cover)	Ken Hammer, Alan Owen, Ronnie Atkins	3:39
8.	"Stronger Than All"	Dronjak	4:29
9.	"Warriors of Faith"	Dronjak, Cans, Strömblad	4:45
10.	"The Fallen One"	Dronjak, Cans, Strömblad	4:23
Total length:			45:07

=== Regional differences ===
- In 2001 a Russian version was released with the following bonus tracks

No.	Title	Length
11.	"Eternal Dark" (Picture cover)
12.	"Stone Cold" (Live)
13.	"I Want Out" (Helloween cover)
14.	"Man on the Silver Mountain" (Rainbow cover)
15.	"The Metal Age" (Live)

- Legacy of Kings Box (limited box which contains CD of Legacy of Kings, personalized pick, Heeding The Call sticker and signed cards of each member.), LP, Shape CD (Sun-Shaped), Picture LP, Value Box (With "Always Will Be" CDS) and Deluxe Edition.
- All versions contain the songs from #1 to #10, excepted the ones listed below.

- The Japanese release contains "Eternal Dark", Stone Cold" and "Steel Meets Steel" as bonus tracks, plus the enhanced part.
- The Brazilian release contains "I Want Out" as bonus track.
- Deluxe Edition contains "The Metal Age" and "Steel Meets Steel" (both recorded live) as bonus tracks.

- There is a limited version that includes all four tracks from the "Always Will Be" single as bonus tracks.
- There is also a re-release of the album which contains a videoclip for "Let the Hammer Fall", and two additional live tracks: "The Metal Age" and "Steel Meets Steel".

== Album charts ==
Country	Ranked
Japan	71
Germany	15
Austria	34
Sweden	15

== Single chart ==
"Heeding the Call" (1998)	Peak position
Germany (GfK)	48

== Credits ==
=== HammerFall ===
- Joacim Cans – lead vocals
- Oscar Dronjak – guitar, backing vocals
- Stefan Elmgren – guitar
- Magnus Rosén – bass
- Patrik Räfling – drums

=== Other personnel ===
- Andreas Marschall – cover art
- Flea Black – artwork
- Fredrik Nordström – engineering and mixing
- Göran Finnberg – mastering
- Mikael Johansson – photography
