= Anders Johansson (drummer) =

Swedish drummer (born 1962)

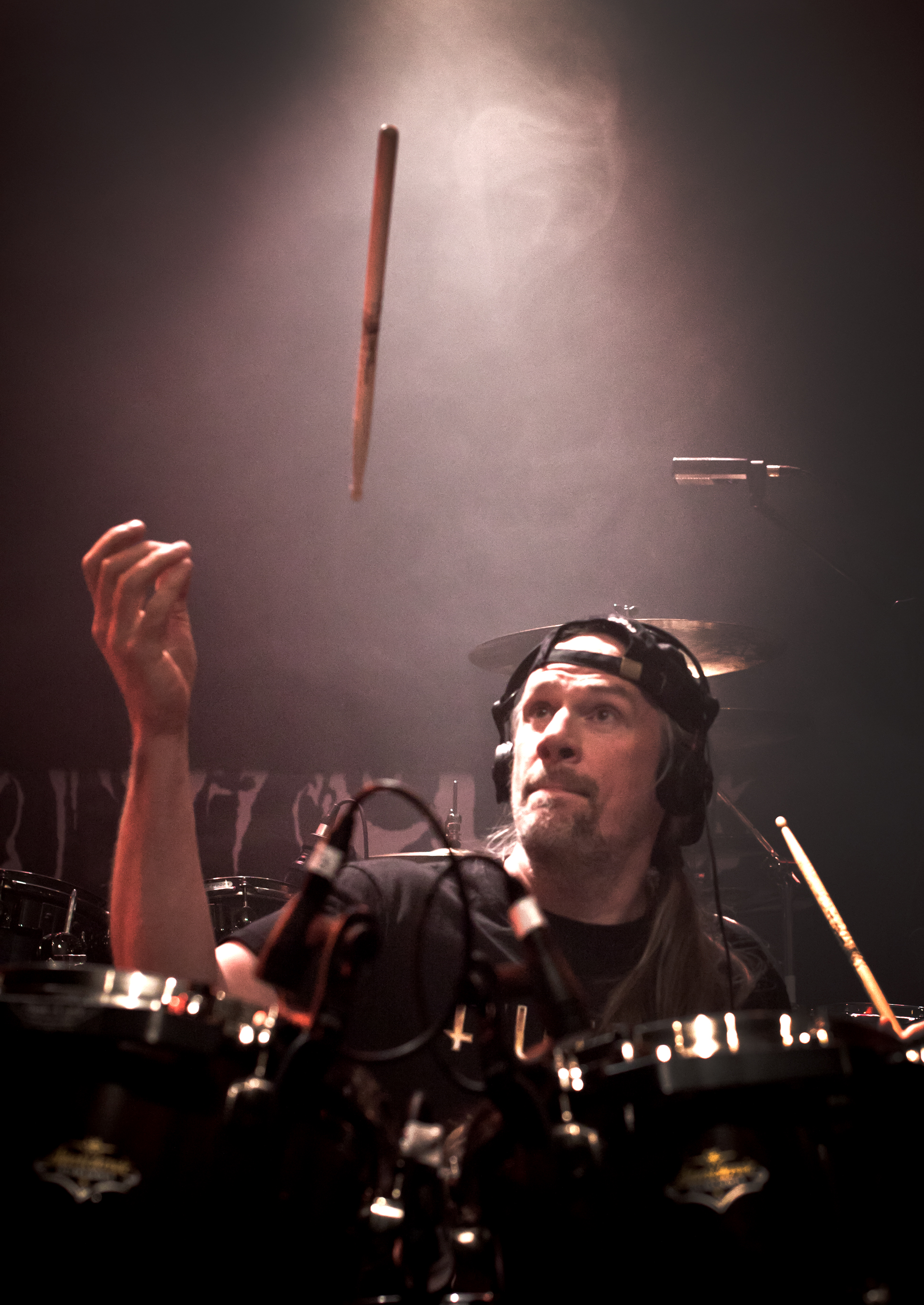
- Johansson in 2011

Background information
- Born: 25 May 1962 (age 64); Stockholm, Sweden
- Genres: Power metal, heavy metal, neoclassical metal, fusion, jazz
- Occupation: Drummer
- Years active: 1984–present

Anders Johansson (born 25 May 1962) is a Swedish musician, best known as the former drummer of HammerFall and Yngwie Malmsteen's Rising Force. He currently plays in the power metal band Tungsten. He is the son of jazz pianist Jan Johansson, and brother of Stratovarius and Rainbow keyboardist Jens Johansson.

== Biography ==
Anders Johansson was born in Stockholm. He and his mum and younger brother later moved to Malmö after his father died in a car accident. The first instrument he played was the piano, but at the age of 14, after a bicycle accident, he switched to drums. From 1979 through 1982 he attended an electronics engineering school.

In 1984 he moved to the United States to join his brother Jens in Yngwie Malmsteen's band. He recorded five albums and made five world tours with Malmsteen. After that, he worked with a huge number of artists, including bassist Jonas Hellborg, Benny Jansson, and with his brother Jens (as "The Johansson Brothers"). He initially joined HammerFall on the "Legacy" tour in 1999, at first only as a session drummer but later as a full-time member.

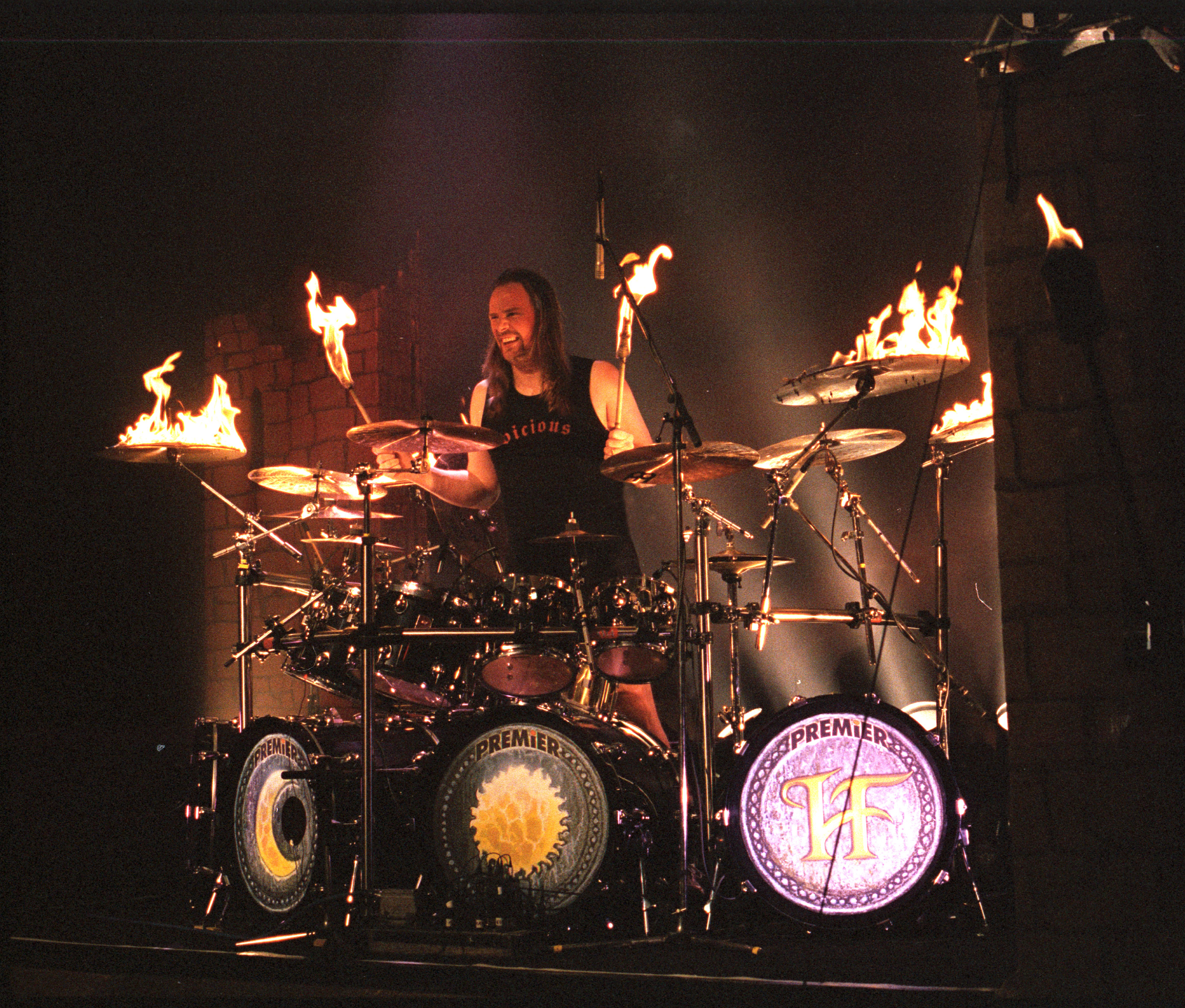
Anders performing with HammerFall in 2012

He is co-founder of Heptagon Records with his brother, created to promote their discs, their father's and some other Swedish musicians' work.

Johansson was a guest drummer on Narnia's album The Great Fall. Johansson is best known for his time in Malmsteen's band, besides his former role as HammerFall's drummer. He has been praised for his technical talent, in metal as well as other genres.

Johansson played with Manowar from 2019 to 2022. His first concert was on 25 March 2019 in Brno, Czech Republic.

In 2016, Anders founded power metal band Tungsten together with his sons Nick and Karl Johansson.

Anders has played concerts with Uli Jon Roth in 2023.

== Personal life ==
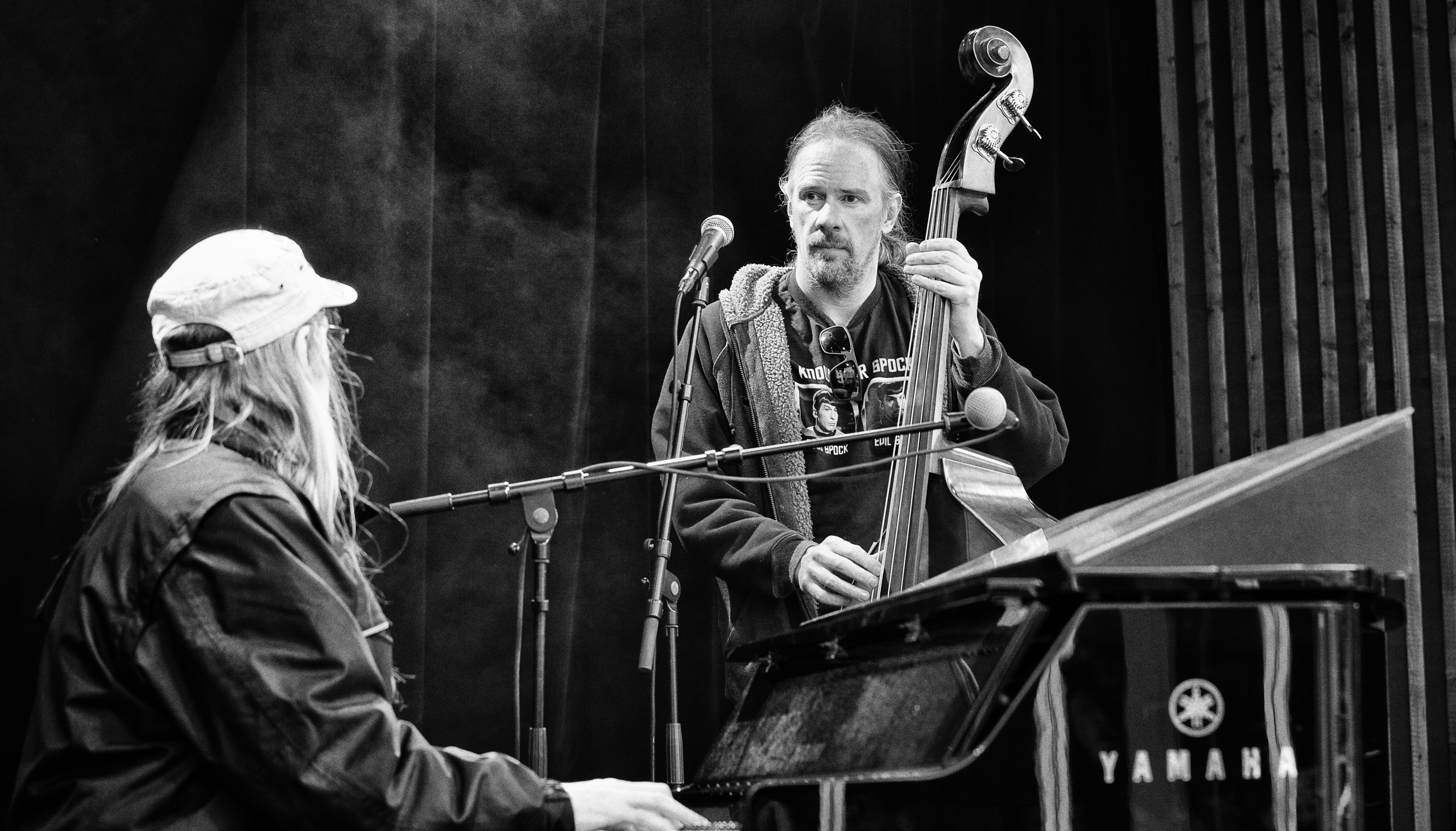
Johansson (right) with his brother Jens.

Johansson also plays the upright bass (double bass) in a jazz duo together with his brother Jens Johansson.

He released his memoirs "Trumslagarpojken" 2016.

Today Anders lives with his family outside Malmö in south Sweden. He is interested in cars, ham radio, astronomy and martial arts.

== Discography ==
=== With Silver Mountain ===
- Skånsk Rock (1982)
- Shakin' Brains (1983)
- Breakin' Chains (2001)

=== With Yngwie Malmsteen ===
- Marching out (1985)
- Trilogy (1986)
- Odyssey (1988)
- Trial by Fire/Live in Leningrad (1989)
- Inspiration (1996)

=== Solo, side projects and session work ===
- Blue Murder: Cry for love (1990)
- Jens Johansson: Fjäderlösa Tvåfotingar (1991)
- Jonas Hellborg Group: E feat. Anders and Jens Johansson (1991), Day Eight Music
- Raf: Ode to a tractor (with Peter Brötzmann 1992)
- Shining path: No other world (with Mudbone Cooper 1993)
- Sökarna: Sound track (tracks with Chilly White and Power United)
- Billionaires Boys Club: Something Wicked Comes (1993)
- Johanssons/Allan Holdsworth: Heavy Machinery (1996)
- Svullo: Radio KRM (1996)
- Martin Svensson: Pojkdrömmar (1997)
- Anders Johansson: Red Shift (1997
- Jens Johansson: Fission (1998)
- Mansson: Arch of Decadence (1997)
- Aces High: Pull no punches (1998)
- Johansson: Sonic Winter/Johansson Bros (1998)
- Johansson: The Last Viking (1999)
- Benny Jansson: Flume Ride (1999)
- A. Johansson & J. Hydén : Elvis Pelvis (2000)
- Aces High: Forgive and forget (2001)
- Empire: Hypnotica (2001)
- Jason Becker trib: Warmth in the wilderness (2001)
- Yonna: Heartbeat (2002)
- Winterlong: The second coming (2003)
- Blackmore's castle: Space Truckin' (2003)
- Snake Charmer: Backyard Boogaloo (2003)
- Magnus Rosén: Imagine a place (2003)
- Mistheria: Messenger of the god (2004)
- Owe Thörnqvist: Recovered (2005)
- Nocturnal rites: Grand illusion (Japanese bonus track) (2005)
- Empire: Trading Souls (2003)
- Narnia: The great fall (2003)
- Planet Alliance: Planet Alliance (2006)
- Time Requiem: Optical Illusion (2006)
- Janne Stark: Mountain of Power (2007)
- Jonas Hellborg, V. Selvaganesh, IA Eklundh, Jens Johansson: Art Metal (2008)
- Geff: Land of the free (2009)
- Full Force: One (2011)
- Full Force: Next level (2012)
- Joacim Cans: Nu kan mörkret falla (2013)
- Jens and Anders Johansson: Live in Sweden (2014)
- Bröderna Johansson: Stilla jul (2017)
- Storis Limpan Band: Patina (2017)
- Hulkoff: Kven (2017)
- Strokkur: Vantablack (2017)
- Björn Olsson: Måsrock (2018)
- Anders och Jens Johansson: Nordic blue (2018)
- Björn Olsson feat. Gustaf Norén: All things together (single) (2019)
- Björn Olsson: Lättillgänglig fusion (single) (2019)
- Gustaf & Viktor Norén: Hymns to the rising sun (2020)
- Måsrock: 2 (2020)
- Hulkoff: Pansarfolk (2020)
- Hurula: Ingen är kär i år och andra sånger (2022)
- CJ Grimmark: Christmas + Hymns & Instrumentals (2022)

=== With HammerFall ===
- Renegade (2000)
- Crimson Thunder (2002)
- One Crimson Night (2003, live album)
- Chapter V: Unbent, Unbowed, Unbroken (2005)
- Threshold (2006)
- Steel Meets Steel: Ten Years of Glory ("Best Of") (2007)
- Masterpieces (2008)
- No Sacrifice, No Victory (2009)
- Infected (2011)
- (r)Evolution (2014)

=== Manowar ===
- The Final Battle I (EP, 2019)

=== With Tungsten ===
- We Will Rise (2019)
- Tundra (2020)
- Bliss (2022)
- The Grand Inferno (2024)
