= HammerFall =

Swedish power metal band

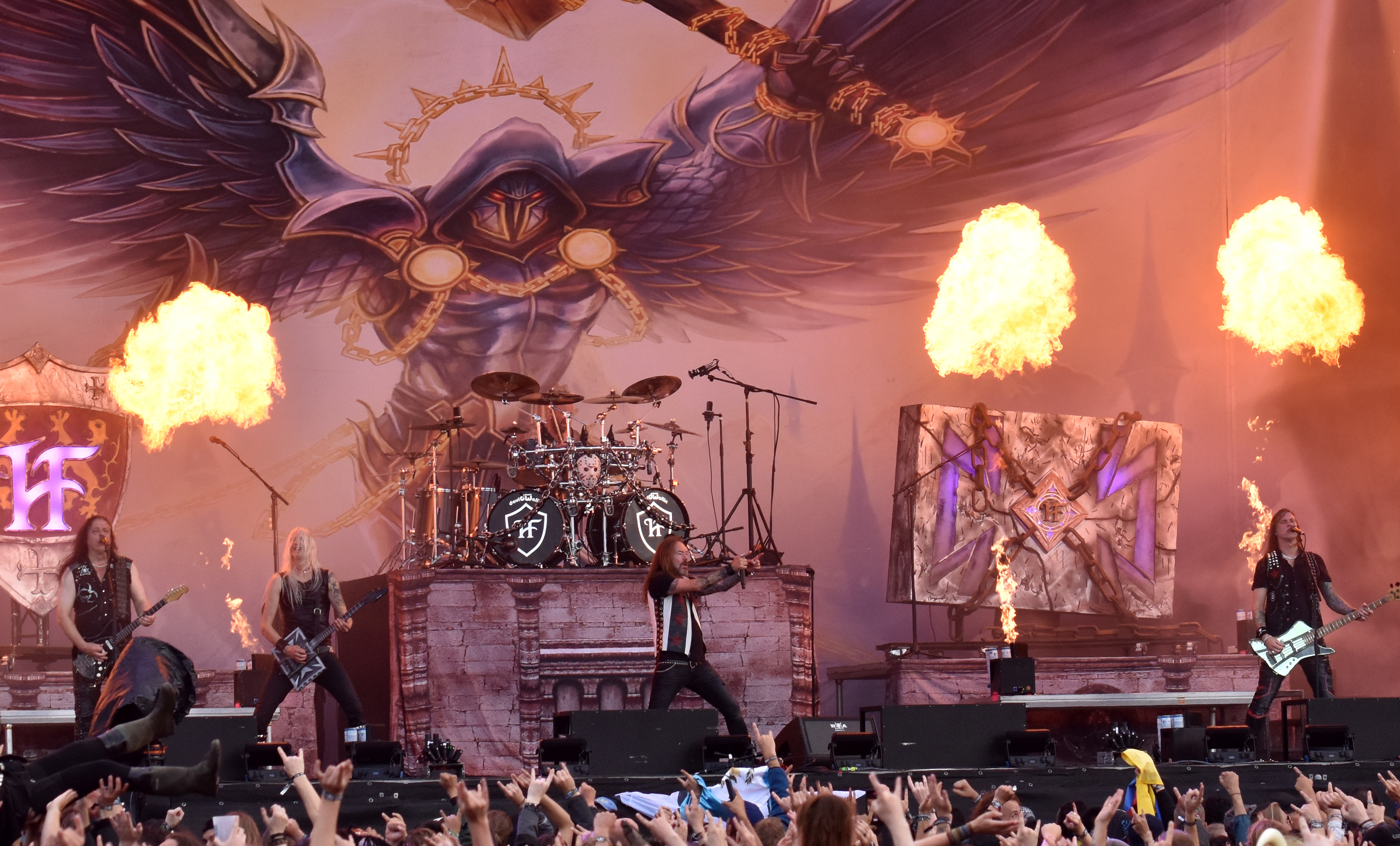
- HammerFall at Wacken Open Air 2023

Background information
- Origin: Gothenburg, Sweden
- Genres: Power metal, heavy metal
- Works: Discography
- Years active: 1993–present
- Labels: Napalm; Nuclear Blast
- Members: Oscar Dronjak; Joacim Cans; Fredrik Larsson; Pontus Norgren; David Wallin
- Past members: Jesper Strömblad; Mikael Stanne; Niklas Sundin; Johan Larsson; Glenn Ljungström; Stefan Elmgren; Magnus Rosén; Anders Johansson; Patrik Räfling; Johan Koleberg
- Website: hammerfall.net

HammerFall is a Swedish power metal band from Gothenburg. It was formed in 1993 by ex-Ceremonial Oath guitarist Oscar Dronjak. They have released thirteen studio albums.

The band has largely stayed consistent with their original sound throughout its career. The group's mascot "Hector" – a role-playing game character belonging to the paladin class – has appeared on most of their album covers.

== History ==
=== Early days (1993–1996) ===
HammerFall was formed when guitarist Oscar Dronjak quit Ceremonial Oath and invited Jesper Strömblad (from Ceremonial Oath and In Flames) to join him as a drummer in a new musical project he had been contemplating for some time. Dronjak had already composed the song "Steel Meets Steel," which was later included on HammerFall's debut album. Dronjak and Strömblad were later joined by lead guitarist Niklas Sundin, bassist Johan Larsson, and vocalist Mikael Stanne. When Niklas Sundin and Johan Larsson left HammerFall the following year, Glenn Ljungström (then guitarist of In Flames) and Fredrik Larsson (bassist of the former Swedish death metal band Dispatched), replaced them.

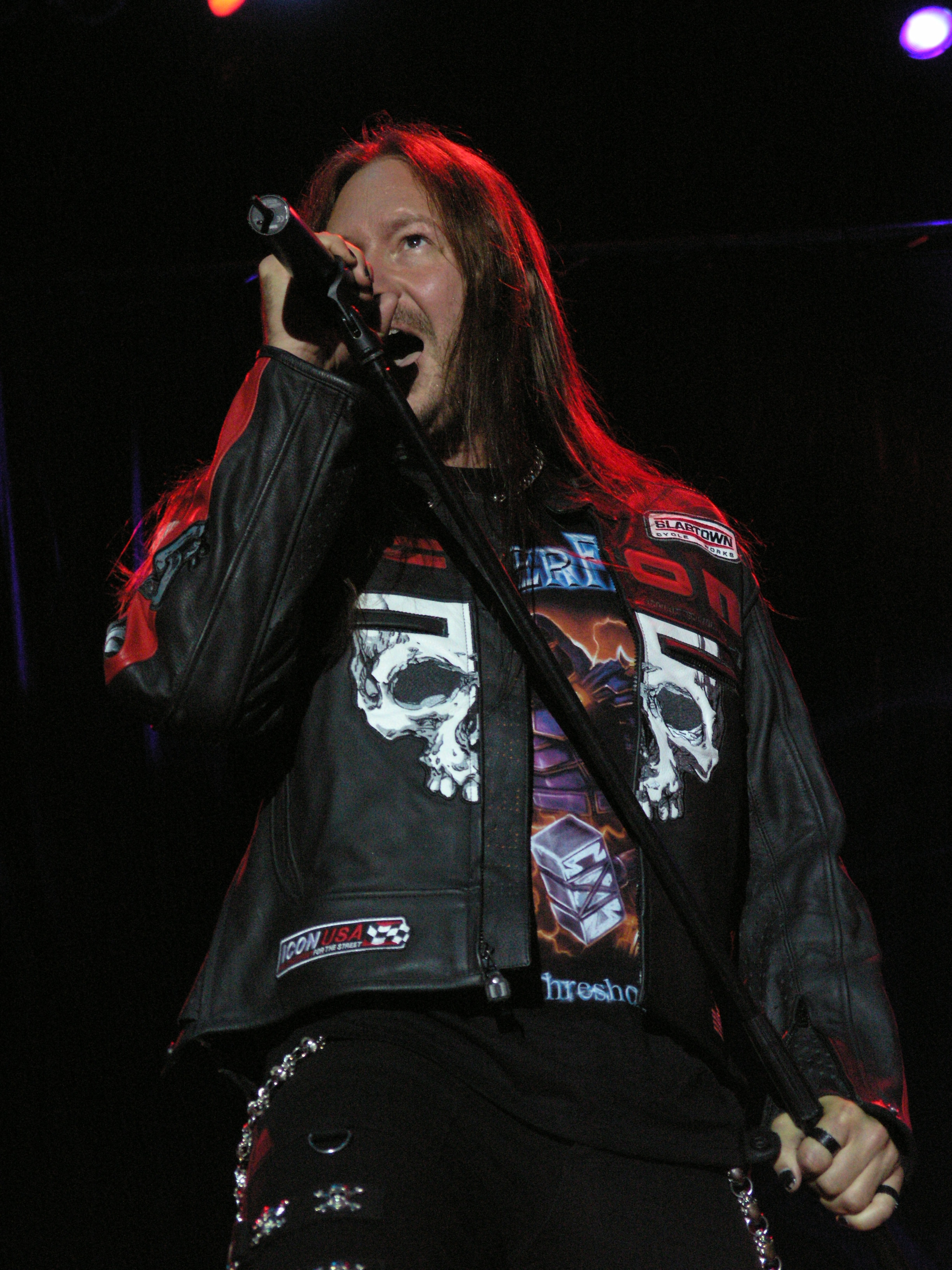
Joacim Cans joined the band in 1996.

All five members played in other bands at the time. Dronjak and Larsson played in Crystal Age; Strömblad and Ljungström played in In Flames and Stanne sang for Dark Tranquillity. Both of these bands influenced Swedish melodic death metal. HammerFall was relegated to being a side project of them all for several years. Their concerts were limited mostly to a local music contest named Rockslaget. The band had few songs of their own and played mostly covers from bands such as Pretty Maids, Judas Priest and Alice Cooper.

In 1996, HammerFall reached the semi-finals of Rockslaget. When Mikael Stanne could not perform with the band in the semi-finals, they found Joacim Cans, who agreed to play with them for the night. The concert was a success although the judges disqualified HammerFall for the finals. By the end of that day, Joacim had already been made an official member of the band.

=== Glory to the Brave and Legacy of Kings (1997–1999) ===
To give more exposure to their work and try for a professional recording deal, a short live performance was recorded and sent to the Dutch label, Vic Records. The musicians soon received a deal and spent the whole of the following year writing the album Glory to the Brave. The album was initially released in the Netherlands and obtained positive feedback; it is also worthy of notice that the band's mascot, the paladin Hector, first appeared on the cover of this album.

As HammerFall grew in popularity, the time available for members of the band to dedicate to other projects became limited. Dronjak and Cans wanted to pursue the path of HammerFall (Dronjak's Crystal Age had ceased to exist some time ago), but Strömblad and Ljungström were committed to In Flames and Larsson was committed to the thrash metal band None. Thus, HammerFall's line-up soon underwent changes. Stefan Elmgren assumed the lead guitar and Patrik Räfling assumed the drums (they joined the band in the beginning of 1997 before the release of Glory to the Brave album) and Larsson decided to remain in the band until a suitable replacement for him was found. This happened in May 1997, when bassist Magnus Rosén joined the band. Stefan Elmgren played some of the guitars on the Glory to the Brave album (such as the acoustic guitars on "I Believe") and Patrik Räfling actually played the drums on all songs in place of Jesper. However, at the time they were considered as guest performers, not members of the band.

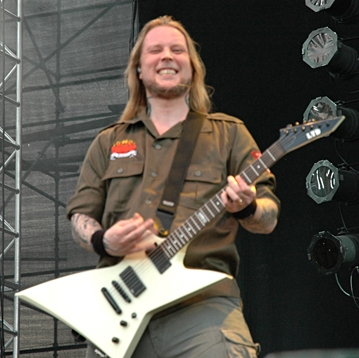
Jesper Strömblad left the band in 1997.

In early 1997, German label Nuclear Blast approached HammerFall with a contract for a European release deal, which included four albums. The deal was accepted and the band proceeded to record their first two music videos — "HammerFall" and "Glory to the Brave". After the release of a promotional single, Glory to the Brave was released throughout Europe. The results were quite unexpected, even after the intense marketing campaign made by Nuclear Blast. The album reached position number 38 on the German Music Chart on the week of its release, something which had never before been achieved by a debut heavy metal music album.

Siding with bands Gamma Ray, Jag Panzer, Lake of Tears and Raven, several tours through the European continent ensued. The concert on Wacken Open Air was performed to a crowd of over ten thousand people.

Towards the end of 1997, Glory to the Brave was released in Japan and the United States. Sales of the album reached one hundred thousand copies. HammerFall was also nominated for the Swedish Grammy award in the Best Hard Rock act category.

In February 1998 they did a small club tour (5 gigs) in Belgium and the Netherlands. Support was the Belgian band Double Diamond, who later became Fireforce.

In February 1998, the recording of Legacy of Kings began. This album was once more written by Joacim, Oscar, and Jesper, who despite having quit the band still took part in the process in order to keep the same general mood of their first release. The album was produced by Fredrik Nordström (from Dream Evil) and Oscar, with the help of Joacim. The band spent a total of one and a half months in the studio recording this album.

HammerFall made some expressive concerts before the release of Legacy of Kings, playing in festivals together with bands such as Alice Cooper, Rammstein, Deep Purple, Dream Theater, Saxon and Stratovarius.

Their first world tour took place in October 1998. During the shows in Sweden, Joacim Cans caught a serious throat infection which made it impossible for him to sing. Shortly afterwards, Magnus Rosén was afflicted with the same disease, and after him the whole of HammerFall's support crew became sick. The members of the band played for as long as possible and then were forced to postpone or cancel a few dates. During their passage through South America, HammerFall took a short break to visit the Brazilian beaches, but they soon resumed their tour.

By the end of that tour, drummer Patrik Räfling left the band, and Anders Johansson, a friend of Magnus Rosén, joined as a touring musician. In the beginning of 1999 he was made a permanent member of the band. Anders had previously worked with guitarist Yngwie Malmsteen on Rising Force in the 80s and 90s and on a number of other projects; he is the brother of Jens Johansson from Stratovarius. He has been praised for his technical and polyrhythmical talent, in metal as well as other genres.

=== Renegade and Crimson Thunder (2000–2003) ===
After a long series of concerts, the band returned to Sweden in order to spend time with their families and begin writing songs for their next album. HammerFall made arrangements for this album to be recorded by Michael Wagener, who had previously produced bands such as Accept, Alice Cooper and Ozzy Osbourne. The recording took eight weeks, and the album was entitled Renegade. The switch from producer Fredrik Nordström to Wagener was met with skepticism from the media in general. However, after the release, critics were mostly positive, even though there was a consensus that the band's sound was remarkably different. A music video by director Roger Johansson was created for the song "Renegade" and reached the top of the Swedish parade; the same soon happened with the album itself, which reached gold status with over forty thousand copies sold.

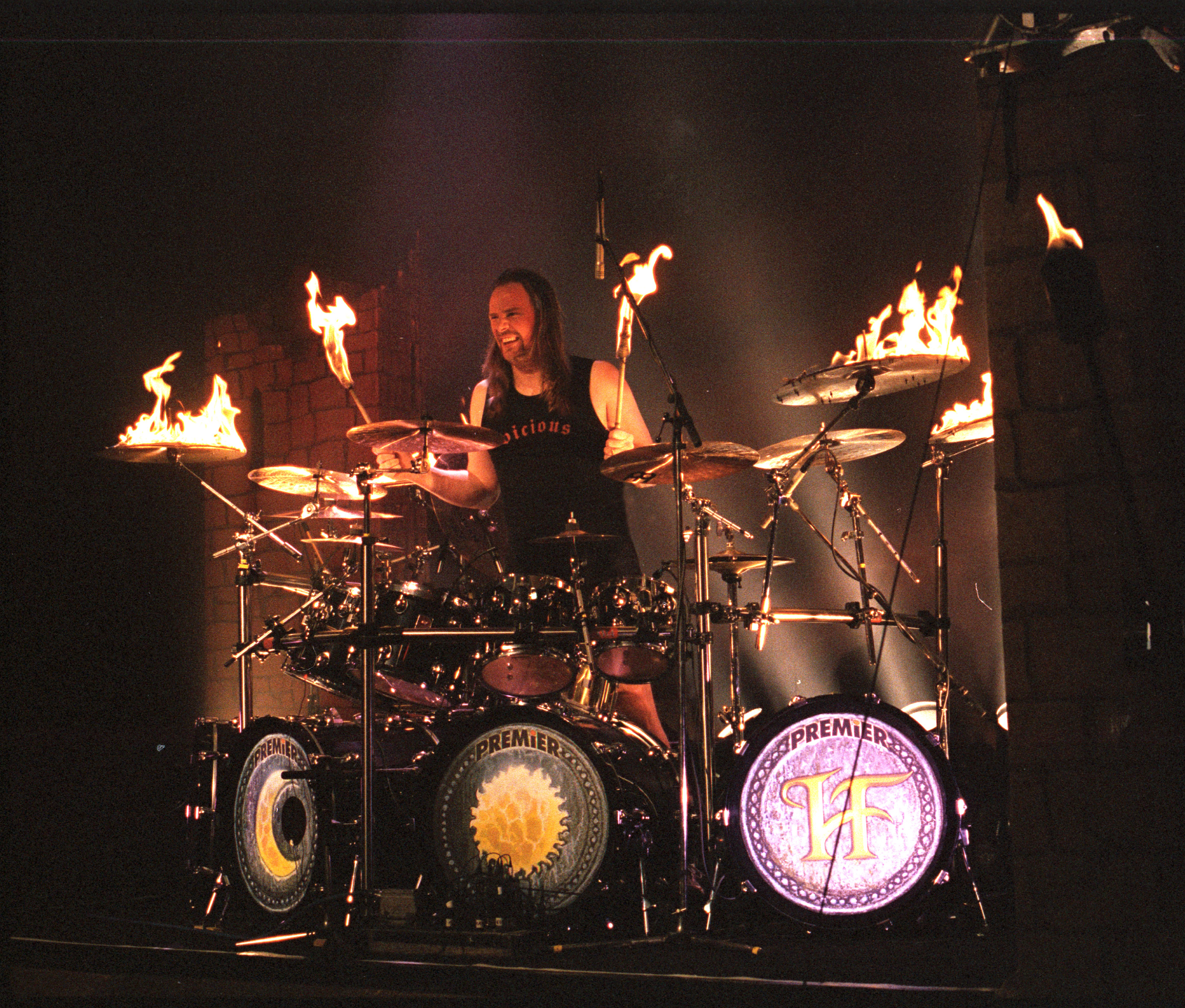
Anders Johansson

Oscar stated on www.metalrules.com just prior to the release of 'Renegade' that they were going for a more "commercial" sound in order to attract a broader audience that otherwise would have been lost to them and that future albums wouldn't follow in this mold.

The band's second world tour began in January 2001. Concerts from this tour counted with a replica version of the album's cover on stage. It was set up as a castle in ruins from which the musicians entered the stage. In total, the tour included almost sixty shows.

The band then released a DVD entitled The Templar Renegade Crusades, which included video footage from recording sessions, live concerts, tour backstages, and encounters with fans. The footage ranged from the recording sessions of Legacy of Kings to the gold album party which took place in November 2001.

HammerFall then proceeded to record their fourth album — Crimson Thunder. Arrangements were made for recording sessions to take place in both JM Studios: from Charlie Bauerfeind, in Wisseloord Studios — in the Netherlands, and studio Blind Guardian — in Germany, for the bass.

By the end of the recording sessions in 2002, a listening session for the press was held. Overall, the reactions were quite positive, and most seemed to perceive the album as a change for the better from Renegade. A single for the song "Hearts on Fire" was released six weeks prior to the album's launch and remained for weeks on the number one spot on the parades of some European countries. The song also attracted a number of new fans to the band due to its chorus-driven melody and simple riffs coupled with fast guitar solos.

The shooting of the music video "Hearts on Fire" by director Roger Johansson was scheduled for August of that year. The band's plans, however, had to be held back for a week due to an incident that occurred one night. While Joacim was drinking with his girlfriend in a rock club he had been frequenting for over a decade, he was attacked by an unidentified person who hit him in the head with a beer glass and hastily escaped. Joacim instantly lost consciousness and had to be taken to a hospital, in which he underwent plastic surgery and rested for a couple of days. As soon as it became medically possible, he joined the band to record the music video.

In order to promote the release of the band's album in North America, they toured with Dio during November and December 2002. Subsequently, the manager of the band disappeared, taking the entirety of the tour's revenue with him. Despite this the tour was very successful, and proceeded to Europe. Changes were made to the band's stage setting, and many investments were made on fireworks and on the presence of the mascot Hector on stage. The scenery on the cover of the single Hearts on Fire was also reproduced and added to the performances. The tour progressed to Japan and then to South America. HammerFall was present on festivals in Germany, Spain and the Czech Republic, playing with bands such as Iron Maiden, Slayer, Twisted Sister, U.D.O. and Stratovarius.

HammerFall's tour was brought to a sudden end when Oscar Dronjak suffered a motorcycle accident, breaking his left arm and sustaining several minor injuries.

They were then left with no choice but to take a break. Stefan dedicated himself to getting a pilot license, Magnus and Anders continued working on their side projects and Joacim began work on his solo album and had his first child. Oscar simply focused on recovering. Together with a group of specialists, he was able to recover to his full capacities. He then joined Anders, Joacim, Stefan again, with bands Helloween, Gamma Ray and Pretty Maids, amongst others, and played in the celebration of the 20 years of the German rock club Rockfabrik.

=== Chapter V: Unbent, Unbowed, Unbroken and Threshold (2005–2008) ===
The live album and DVD One Crimson Night was released in February 2003. After two years of hiatus the band released Chapter V: Unbent, Unbowed, Unbroken, which was followed by a European and South American tour. A video for the song "Bloodbound" was made by director Roger Johansson.

On 16 October, it was reported that HammerFall (along with the band Europe) would be part of the Eurovision song contest. This rumor was refuted by lead singer Joacim Cans only a couple weeks later. Joacim was quoted as saying "So there were no talks whatsoever to be part of this."

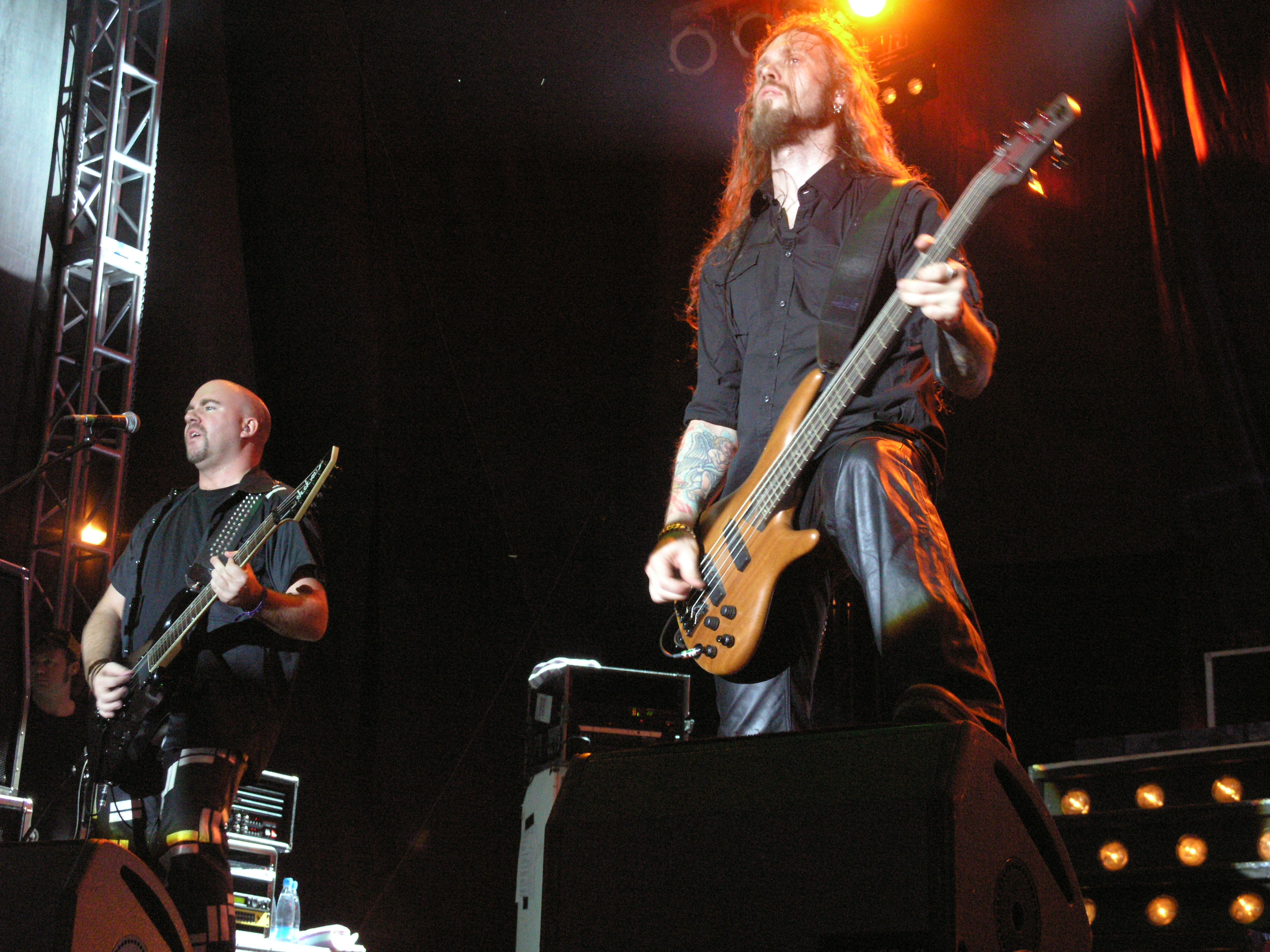
Stefan Elmgren left the band in 2008 and Fredrik Larsson re-joined in 2007.

Their 6th album, titled Threshold, was released on 20 October 2006 and it went directly to a number 1 position on the Swedish charts.

On 6 March 2007, a statement was posted online at HammerFall's official website (and his own official website), that bassist Magnus Rosén would not be involved with the band anymore. The reason for his departure stated that he was unhappy in the band and wants to focus on other projects. On his own website (and therefore with his own official statement) it was announced that Magnus was tired of the simple bassplaying he was forced to play in HammerFall, and that he was unable to bring his own material to the band. He now wants to "be more creative in his career". On 10 April it was announced on the official HammerFall homepage that the replacement for Magnus is former member Fredrik Larsson, who played bass on the Glory to the Brave album. Three new songs were recorded for the band's first compilation album. These are "Last Man Standing", "Restless Soul", and "The Abyss". They also rerecorded the Glory To The Brave track "HammerFall". "Steel Meets Steel - Ten Years of Glory" was released on 12 October 2007.

On 2 April 2008, Stefan Elmgren announced his decision to leave HammerFall in order to pursue a career as a commercial pilot. His replacement is Pontus Norgren from The Poodles. On 27 June 2008, the band released the compilation album "Masterpieces". The album has on it a collection of every song the band has covered, plus three new cover songs previously unreleased. This was Stefan Elmgren's last release with the band.

=== No Sacrifice, No Victory and Infected (2009–2012) ===
HammerFall's album No Sacrifice, No Victory was released in February 2009. This album features a cover song My Sharona. The Album peaked at No. 38 on the Billboard heatseakers charts. A music video for the song "Any Means Necessary" was released some time before the actual release of the album. To kick off their new album, HammerFall toured all over the world with several support bands, such as fellow Swedish band Sabaton. In the summer 2010 the band played a couple of high-profile festivals throughout Europe, including Sonisphere Festival, High Voltage Festival, Metalcamp, Graspop Metal Meeting and many more. The summer tour was named "Any Festival Necessary".

HammerFall's 8th album was released on 18 May 2011 (Sweden), 20 May (Europe), and 7 June (North America), under the name Infected. After several months of recordings in Göteborg, Sweden and Nashville, TN, the new studio album was finally finished in February. The European tour followed, under the name "European Outbreak". Infected is also the first HammerFall album not to feature the mascot, the knight Hector, on the cover.

In 2012, HammerFall recorded a live DVD while performing a show in Dalhalla, Sweden, that featured some former band members as well as other special guests. The DVD celebrated 15 years of the band's existence, and was titled "Gates of Dalhalla".

In 2013, HammerFall took a break and some time to spend with their families or side-works. Oscar wrote a book about HammerFall, Legenden om HammerFall (Swedish: "The Legend of HammerFall), that was released on 24 October and tells of the band's events during the past 16 years, but it still exists only in Swedish.

=== (r)Evolution and Built to Last (2014–2017) ===
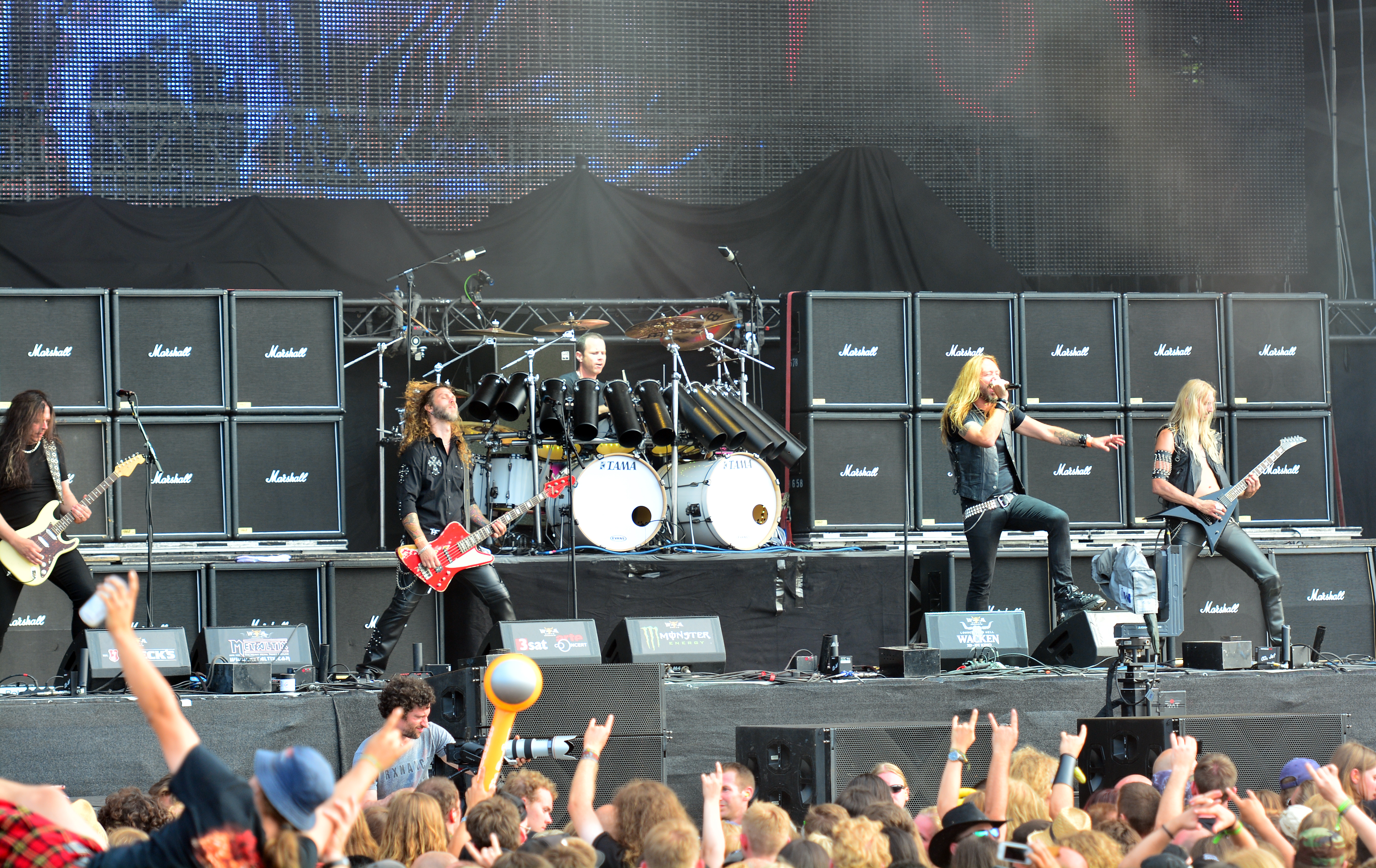
HammerFall at Wacken Open Air 2014

HammerFall once again reunited with producer Fredrik Nordström. The vocals were recorded by James Michael. For the mix, Fredrik Nordström spent 3 weeks in his own studio.

(r)Evolution was released on 29 August 2014, and stormed the charts worldwide, debuting on #1 in Sweden and on the Billboard Heatseekers Chart, as well as reaching Top 5 in several other countries. The subsequent tour, dubbed the World Wide (r)Evolution 2014-15, will see HammerFall return to Latin America together with Edguy and Gotthard, followed by a full European assasult in the beginning of 2015. The band was somewhat distraught when drummer Anders Johansson left shortly after the release of (r)Evolution, but David Wallin (Pain) was brought in as a temporary replacement to ensure that the show would go on. Around the same time, it was also decided that Fredrik would be on parental leave from September 2014 through March 2015. Former guitar player Stefan Elmgren stepped in handled the 4-string duties during that period, making this line-up a unique experience during the Latin American and European tour.

In March 2016, the band announced that they had signed with Napalm Records. Their tenth studio album, Built to Last, was released on 4 November 2016.

On 16 December 2016, David Wallin resigned from the band to focus on his family, and the same day the band introduced their new drummer Johan Koleberg.

On 2 September 2017, it was announced that David Wallin's family related issues had been resolved and that he was reinstated into the band.

=== Dominion, Hammer of Dawn and Avenge the Fallen (2018–present) ===
On 18 December 2018, HammerFall announced their eleventh studio album Dominion. It was released on 16 August 2019.

Following a major tour in support of the album throughout Europe, and North America as a special guest of the band Sabaton, the band later announced their live album Live! Against the World which was released on 23 October 2020.

On 19 March 2021, HammerFall announced that they will join Helloween on a big European tour in 2022 and '23 called United Forces. Latin American tour dates as well as North American dates were added later on. The tour saw the band supporting their twelfth studio album, Hammer of Dawn, which was released on 25 February 2022. They released the single "Brotherhood" a day before the album's release. The following month, Hammerfall supported Helloween on tour in Europe. They supported Helloween on tour again the following year.

On 26 April 2024, the band released the first single "Hail to the King" and its corresponding music video. At the same time, they announced that their thirteenth studio album, Avenge the Fallen, which was released on 9 August 2024.

== Band members ==
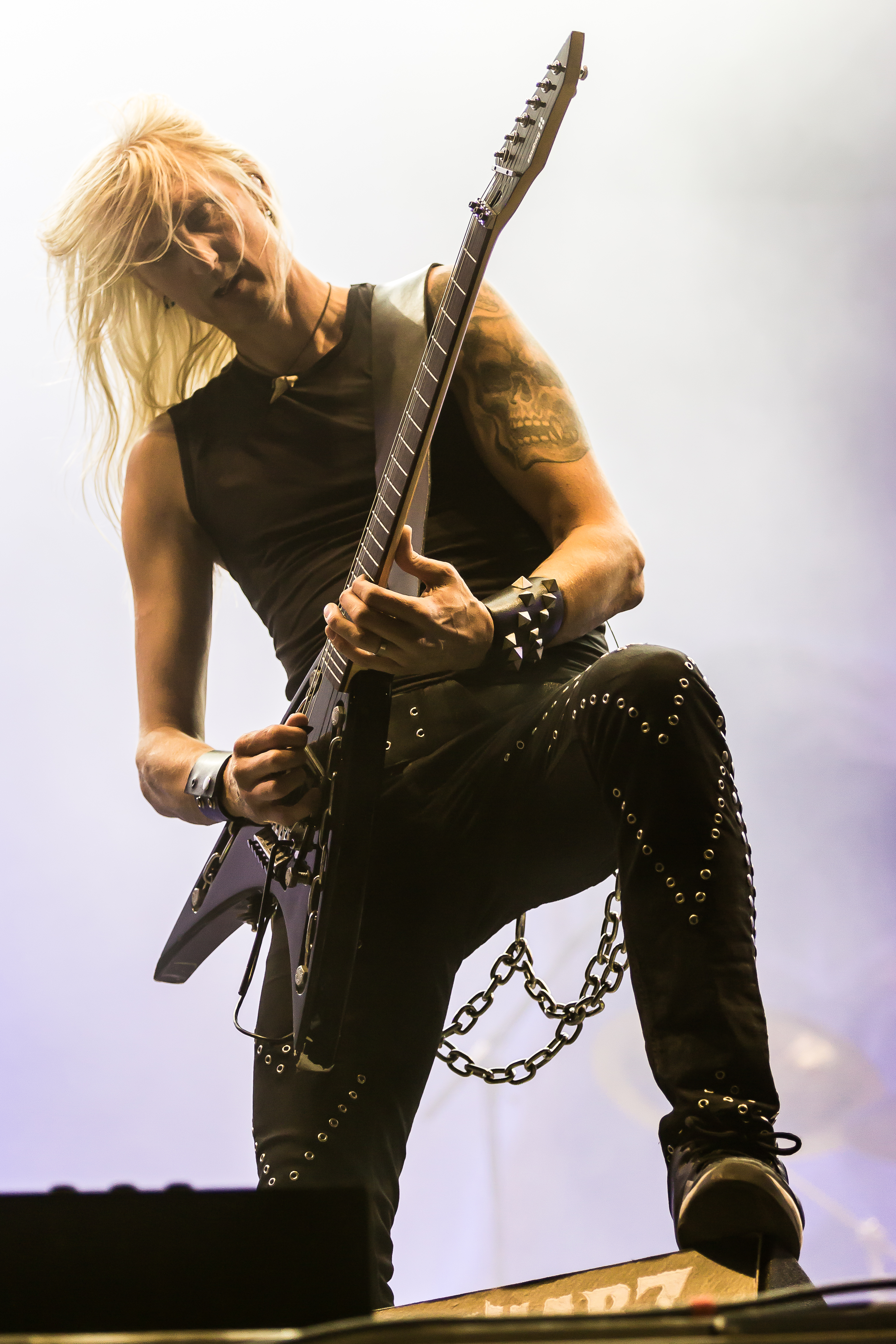
Oscar Dronjak

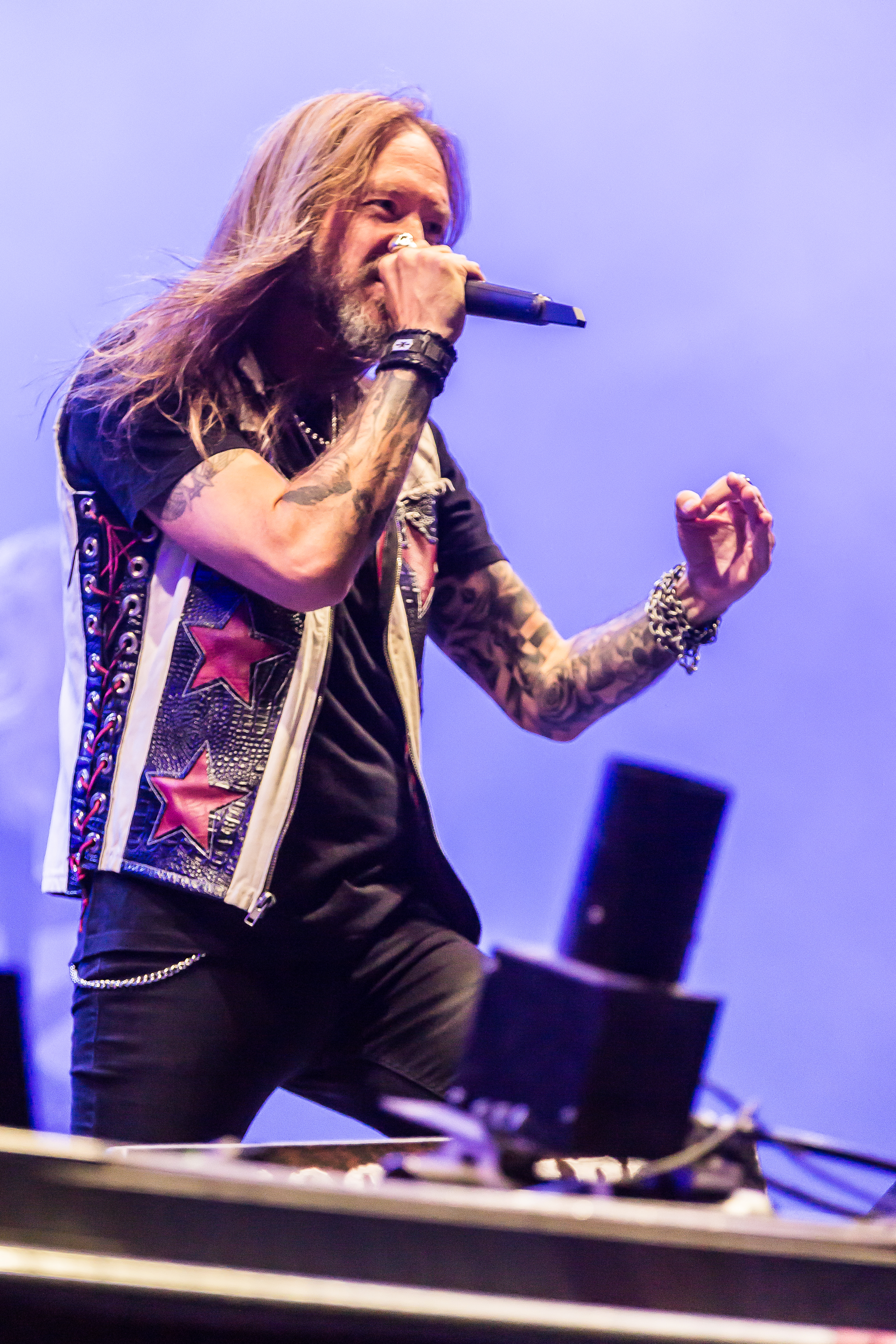
Joacim Cans

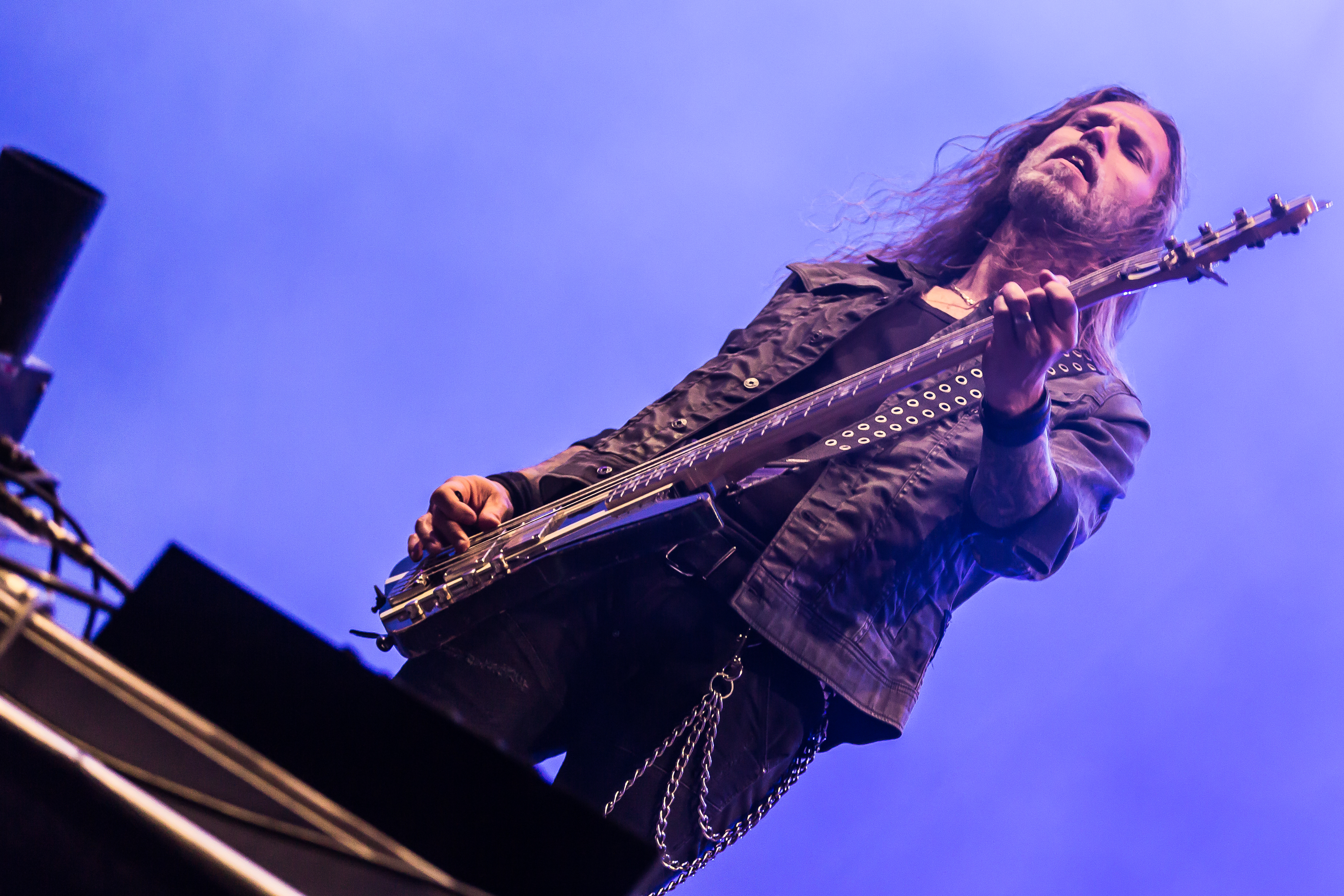
Fredrik Larsson

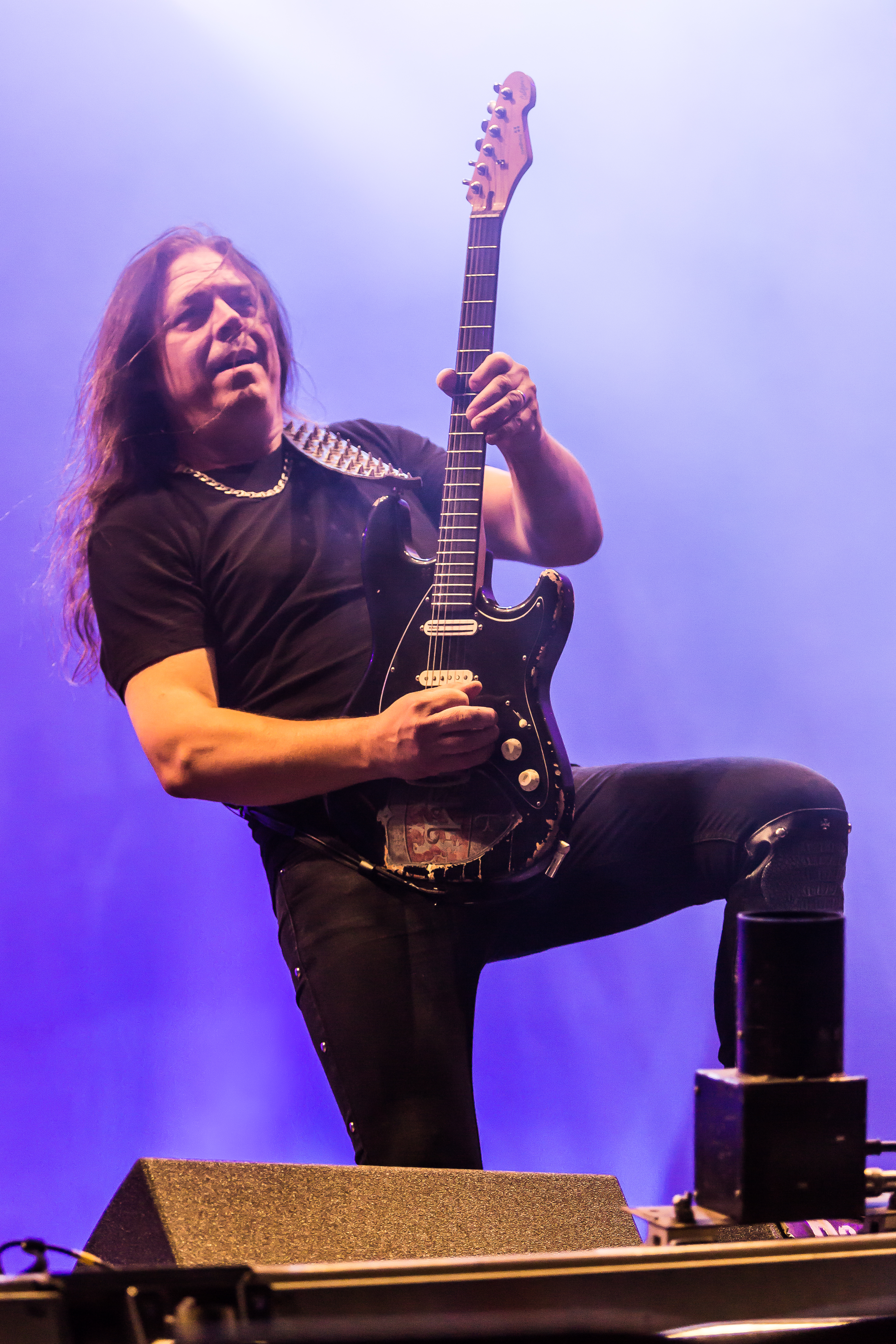
Pontus Norgren

=== Current ===
- Oscar Dronjak – guitars, backing vocals (1993–present)
- Joacim Cans – lead vocals (1996–present)
- Fredrik Larsson – bass (1994–1997, 2007–present)
- Pontus Norgren – guitars, backing vocals (2008–present)
- David Wallin – drums (2014–present)

=== Former ===
- Jesper Strömblad – drums (1993–1996)
- Mikael Stanne – lead vocals (1993–1996)
- Niklas Sundin – guitars (1993–1995)
- Johan Larsson – bass (1993–1994)
- Glenn Ljungström – guitars (1995–1997)
- Stefan Elmgren – guitars, backing vocals (1997–2008)
- Magnus Rosén – bass (1997–2007)
- Patrik Räfling – drums (1996–1999)
- Anders Johansson – drums (1999–2014)

=== Touring ===
- Pontus Egberg – bass (2012)
- Stefan Elmgren – bass (2014)
- Johan Koleberg – drums (2016–2017)

== Discography ==
Studio albums

- Glory to the Brave (1997)
- Legacy of Kings (1998)
- Renegade (2000)
- Crimson Thunder (2002)
- Chapter V: Unbent, Unbowed, Unbroken (2005)
- Threshold (2006)
- No Sacrifice, No Victory (2009)
- Infected (2011)
- (r)Evolution (2014)
- Built to Last (2016)
- Dominion (2019)
- Hammer of Dawn (2022)
- Avenge the Fallen (2024)

== Awards and nominations ==
Metal Hammer Awards (GER)

Year	Nominee / work	Award	Result
2015	HammerFall	Maximum Metal	Won
