= Oscar Dronjak =

Swedish guitarist

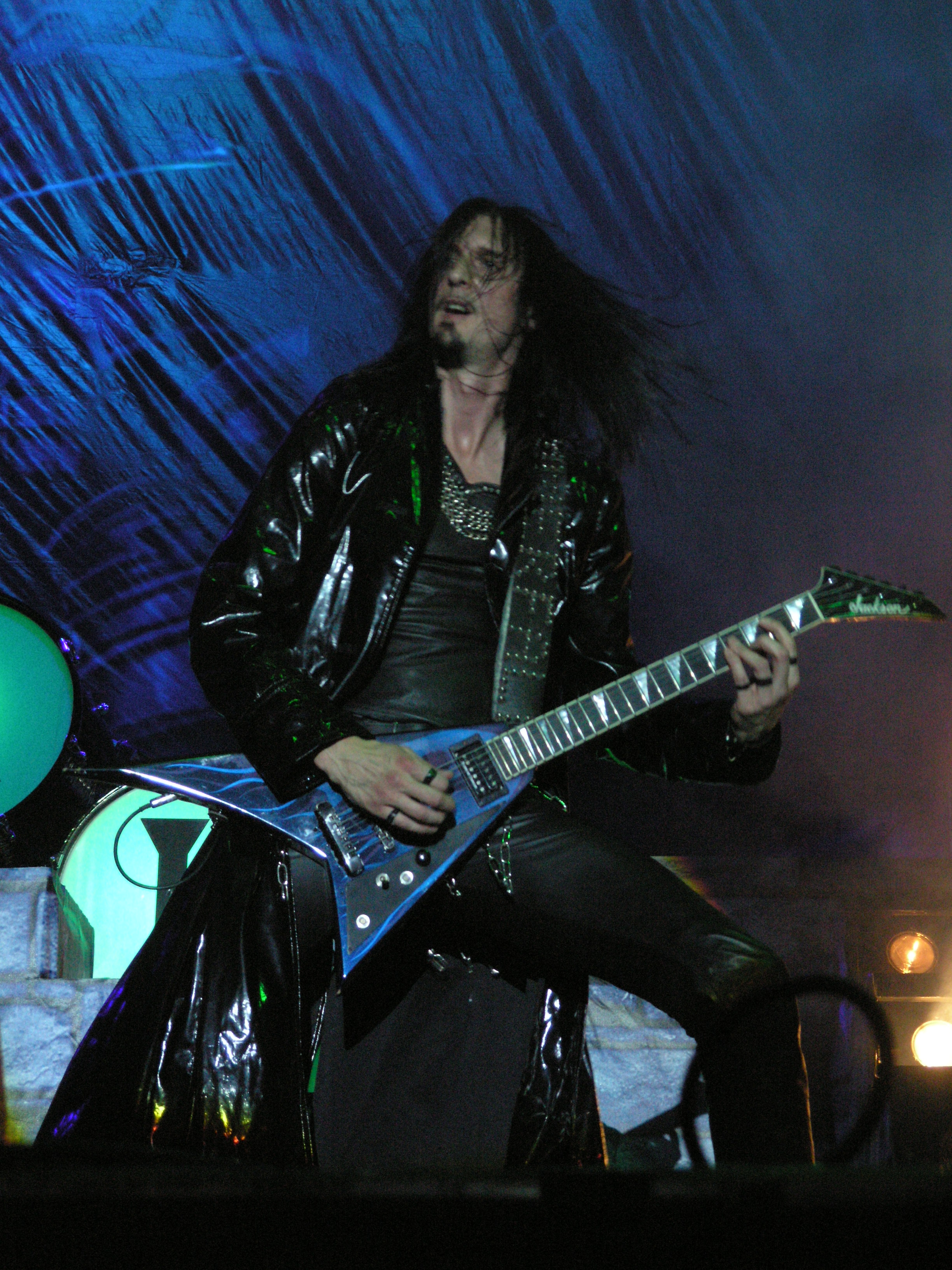
- Oscar Dronjak during HammerFall concert on Masters of Rock 2007 festival.

Background information
- Born: Oscar Fredrick Dronjak; 20 January 1972 (age 54); Mölndal, Sweden
- Genres: Power metal, heavy metal, thrash metal, black metal, death metal
- Occupations: Musician, songwriter
- Instruments: Guitar, vocals
- Years active: 1989–present
- Label: Nuclear Blast

Oscar Fredrick Dronjak (born 20 January 1972) is a Swedish guitarist and founder of the power metal band HammerFall. Prior to the success of HammerFall, he also played and released albums with the death metal acts Ceremonial Oath and Crystal Age.

== Biography ==
Dronjak was born in the Swedish town of Mölndal to a Serbian father from Belgrade and a Swedish mother. Dronjak's brother is Moderate politician Daniel Dronjak.

His first instrument was the recorder; he then played trombone for a few years until, at the age of fourteen, he settled on guitar. Soon after, he started his first band, called The Hippie Killers. In 1989 he started a death metal band called Desecrator, which was later renamed Ceremonial Oath. But just before they released their first album, he quit the band. The end of his career in Ceremonial Oath was the beginning of HammerFall. At first, Oscar's main priority was the death metal band Crystal Age. Thus, HammerFall was initially merely a side project, where he and some friends were just rehearsing some songs that he had written, one of them being "Steel Meets Steel". But soon, they recorded their first album, called Glory to the Brave. Throughout his career, Oscar has been using Jackson guitars, most notably the Jackson Rhoads, but also ESP Guitars and Washburn. Since 2014, he exclusively plays Sandberg Guitars, with the hammer guitar as a special attraction.

He also performed backing vocals for three In Flames albums: Lunar Strain (on the track "Lunar Strain"), Subterranean (on the track "Stand Ablaze") and The Jester Race ("Dead Eternity").

In 2016 he performed for the HammerFall album Dominion, which is scheduled to be released by Napalm Records on 16 August 2019.
