= List of Riot V band members =

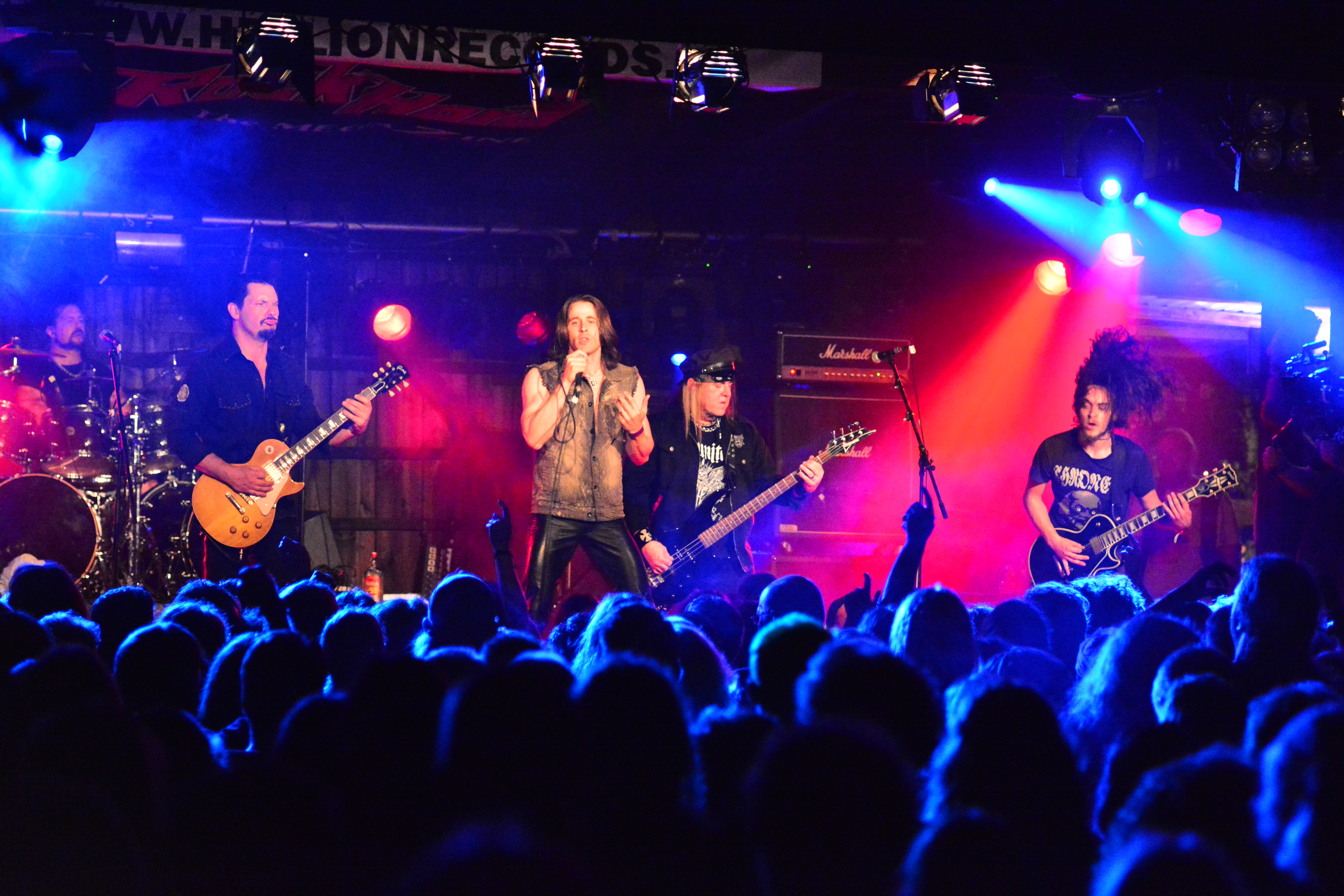
Riot V performing live in 2016.

Riot V is an American heavy metal band from New York City. Originally known as Riot, the band was formed in the summer of 1975 with an original lineup of vocalist Guy Speranza, guitarists Mark Reale and Louie "L.A." Kouvaris, bassist Phil Feit and drummer Peter Bitelli. Since the group's reformation in 2014 as Riot V, following the 2012 death of Reale, the band has consisted of bassist Don Van Stavern (originally a member from 1986 to 1990, and since 2008), guitarist Mike Flyntz (since 1989), drummer Frank Gilchriest (from 2003 to 2007, and since 2014), lead vocalist Todd Michael Hall (since 2013) and guitarist Nick Lee (since 2014).

== History ==
Riot was formed in the summer of 1975 by guitarist Mark Reale with vocalist Guy Speranza, second guitarist Louie "L.A." Kouvaris, bassist Phil Feit and drummer Peter Bitelli. During sessions for the group's debut album Rock City at the end of 1976, Feit was replaced by Jimmy Iommi, who completed the recording. The band toured in promotion of the release throughout 1977 and 1978, before Kouvaris left during the writing of the band's sophomore album towards the end of the year. He was replaced by Rick Ventura, who completed the writing and recording of 1979's Narita. Before the album was released in the summer of 1979, Iommi and Bitelli were dismissed from Riot, with Feit returning on bass and Sandy Slavin taking over on drums. Feit was replaced by Kip Leming in the summer of 1980.

The band released its third album Fire Down Under in 1981, before Speranza left at the end of the year and departed the music business completely. Shortly into the next year, Riot replaced Speranza with Rhett Forrester, who debuted on Restless Breed in the spring. This was followed by Born in America the next year, before the group eventually disbanded after difficulties with its management and record label, performing a final show in May 1984. Reale, the sole remaining original member of the band, reformed Riot in early 1986 after relocating to San Antonio, Texas and briefly working under the name Narita. Alongside Reale, Slavin and new bassist Don Van Stavern was former Jag Panzer vocalist Harry Conklin, who performed one show before Forrester returned for a brief second spell.

By late 1986, Riot had returned to New York, and Forrester and Slavin had been replaced with Tony Moore and Mark Edwards, respectively. During 1987, Edwards was replaced by former Juggernaut drummer Bobby Jarzombek, who completed work on the 1988 album Thundersteel. This four-piece lineup also recorded The Privilege of Power in 1989, before Mike Flyntz joined as second guitarist before a Japanese tour at the end of the year. Shortly after The Privilege of Power's early 1990 release, Pete Perez replaced Van Stavern on bass, with the new lineup releasing Riot in Japan – Live!! from the subsequent tour. By 1992, Moore had been replaced by Mike DiMeo. This lineup recorded 1993's Nightbreaker and four tracks for 1995's The Brethren of the Long House, before Jarzombek left.

John Macaluso completed work on The Brethren of the Long House, before Jarzombek returned in time for the recording of Inishmore in 1997. Shine On and Sons of Society followed, before Jarzombek was hired for Halford in early 2000. He was replaced by Pat Magrath for European touring in 2000. The next year, Bobby Rondinelli joined for the recording of Through the Storm, which was released in 2002. After a short hiatus, Riot returned in October 2003 with new drummer Frank Gilchriest of Virgin Steele. The new lineup recorded Army of One that year, although it remained unreleased until 2006. In the meantime, Riot performed with bassist Randy Coven in place of Perez for two shows – the first in August 2004, the second in February 2005 at a Spanish festival.

Riot's performance at Atarfe Vega Rock in February 2005 also saw the debut of a new singer, Mike Tirelli, who was said to be a temporary replacement for DiMeo while he was working with his new band, the Lizards. In April that year, it was reported that DiMeo had "officially left" the band, although this announcement was reversed just a few days later. Despite this, the group continued to perform with Tirelli as their frontman throughout 2006 and 2007. After a short break, Riot announced in December 2008 that the Thundersteel lineup of Tony Moore, Mark Reale, Mike Flyntz, Don Van Stavern and Bobby Jarzombek had reformed, with recording and touring planned for the next year. Moore left again a year later, but returned in September 2010 as they continued writing and recording.

Immortal Soul was released in 2011, before founding and sole constant member Mark Reale died on January 25, 2012. The band had played its final few booked shows of the month without Reale, "at the strong urging of [his] family". The remaining members of Riot teased a continuation of the group following Reale's death, eventually returning in November 2013 with new vocalist Todd Michael Hall, under the name Riot V. The rest of the lineup returned from the last incarnation, before Nick Lee was added on guitar and Jarzombek was replaced by returning drummer Frank Gilchriest, both in January 2014. This lineup has remained intact ever since, releasing the studio albums Unleash the Fire in 2014 and Armor of Light in 2018.

== Members ==
Image	Name	Years active	Instruments	Release contributions
	Don Van Stavern	1986–1990; 2008–2012; 2013–present	bass	Thundersteel (1988); The Privilege of Power (1990); all Riot/Riot V releases from Immortal Soul (2011) onwards; The Tyrant Sessions (2005)
	Valentino Francavilla	2026-present	lead vocals	
	Mike Flyntz	1989–2012; 2013–present	guitars; backing vocals	all Riot/Riot V releases from Riot in Japan – Live!! (1992) onwards
	Frank Gilchriest	2003–2007; 2014–present	drums	Army of One (2006); all Riot V releases from Unleash the Fire (2014) onwards
	Nick Lee	2014–present	guitars	

=== Former ===
Image	Name	Years active	Instruments	Release contributions
	Mark Reale	1975–1984; 1986–2012 (until his death)	guitars; keyboards; percussion; mandolin; banjo; backing vocals	all Riot releases from Rock City (1977) to Immortal Soul (2011)
	Guy Speranza	1975–1981 (died 2003)	lead vocals; percussion	Rock City (1977); Narita (1979); Fire Down Under (1981); Riot Live (1989)
	Peter Bitelli	1975–1979	drums; percussion	Rock City (1977); Narita (1979)
	Lou "L.A." Kouvaris	1975–1978 (died 2020)	guitars	Rock City (1977)
	Phil Feit	1975–1976; 1979–1980	bass	Rock City (1977) – three tracks only
	Jimmy Iommi	1976–1979	bass	Rock City (1977); Narita (1979)
	Rick Ventura	1978–1984	guitars	all Riot releases from Narita (1979) to Born in America (1983); Riot Live (1989)
	Sandy Slavin	1979–1984; 1986	drums	Fire Down Under (1981); Restless Breed (1982); Riot Live (1982); Born in America (1983); Riot Live (1989)
	Kip Leming	1980–1984	bass	Fire Down Under (1981); Restless Breed (1982); Riot Live (1982); Born in America (1983); Riot Live (1989)
	Rhett Forrester	1981–1984; 1986 (died 1994)	lead vocals; harmonica	Restless Breed (1982); Riot Live (1982); Born in America (1983)
	Gerard "GT" Trevino	1983–1984	guitars	none
	Harry Conklin	1986	lead vocals	The Tyrant Sessions (2005)
	Tony Moore	1986–1992; 2008–2009; 2010–2012	lead vocals	Thundersteel (1988); The Privilege of Power (1990); Riot in Japan – Live!! (1992); Immortal Soul (2011)
	Mark Edwards	1986–1987	drums	Thundersteel (1988) – four tracks only
	Bobby Jarzombek	1987–1995; 1997–2000; 2008–2012; 2013–2014	drums	all Riot releases from Thundersteel (1988) to Sons of Society (1999), except Riot Live (1989); The Tyrant Sessions (2005); Immortal Soul (2011)
	Pete Perez	1990–2007	bass; backing vocals	all Riot releases from Riot in Japan – Live!! (1992) to Army of One (2006), except The Tyrant Sessions (2005)
	Mike DiMeo	1992–2005	lead vocals; keyboards; Hammond organ	all Riot releases from Nightbreaker (1993) to Army of One (2006), except The Tyrant Sessions (2005)
	John Macaluso	1995–1997	drums; percussion	The Brethren of the Long House (1995)
	Pat Magrath	2000	drums	none
	Bobby Rondinelli	2001–2002	drums	Through the Storm (2002)
	Mike Tirelli	2005–2007	lead vocals	none

=== Touring ===
Image	Name	Years active	Instruments	Details
	Randy Coven	2004; 2005 (died 2014)	bass	Coven filled in for Pete Perez on two occasions: in August 2004 and February 2005.
	Lance Barnewold	2016; 2017	guitars	Barnewold temporarily stepped in for Nick Lee on multiple occasions in 2016 and 2017.
	Joey Villalobos	2016	guitars	Villalobos took over from Barnewold, who was unavailable, at a show in October 2016.

== Lineups ==
Period	Members	Releases
May 1975 – late 1976	Guy Speranza – lead vocals, percussion; Mark Reale – guitars, backing vocals; L.A. Kouvaris – guitars; Phil Feit – bass; Peter Bitelli – drums, percussion	Rock City (1977) – three tracks
Late 1976 – August 1978	Guy Speranza – lead vocals, percussion; Mark Reale – guitars, backing vocals; L.A. Kouvaris – guitars; Jimmy Iommi – bass; Peter Bitelli – drums, percussion	Rock City (1977) – remaining tracks
Summer 1978 – summer 1979	Guy Speranza – lead vocals, percussion; Mark Reale – guitars, backing vocals; Rick Ventura – guitars; Jimmy Iommi – bass; Peter Bitelli – drums, percussion	Narita (1979)
Summer 1979 – spring 1980	Guy Speranza – lead vocals, percussion; Mark Reale – guitars, backing vocals; Rick Ventura – guitars; Phil Feit – bass; Sandy Slavin – drums	none
Spring 1980 – December 1981	Guy Speranza – lead vocals, percussion; Mark Reale – guitars, backing vocals; Rick Ventura – guitars; Kip Leming – bass; Sandy Slavin – drums	Fire Down Under (1981); Riot Live (1989)
December 1981 – late 1983	Rhett Forrester – lead vocals, harmonica; Mark Reale – guitars, backing vocals; Rick Ventura – guitars; Kip Leming – bass; Sandy Slavin – drums	Restless Breed (1982); Riot Live (1982); Born in America (1983)
Late 1983 – May 1984	Rhett Forrester – lead vocals, harmonica; Mark Reale – guitars, backing vocals; Gerard Trevino – guitars; Kip Leming – bass; Sandy Slavin – drums	none
Band inactive June 1984 – early 1986
Early 1986	Harry Conklin – lead vocals; Mark Reale – guitars, backing vocals; Don Van Stavern – bass; Sandy Slavin – drums	none
Spring – summer 1986	Rhett Forrester – lead vocals; Mark Reale – guitars, backing vocals; Don Van Stavern – bass; Sandy Slavin – drums	none
Late 1986 – 1987	Tony Moore – lead vocals; Mark Reale – guitars, backing vocals; Don Van Stavern – bass; Mark Edwards – drums	Thundersteel (1988) – four tracks
1987 – November 1989	Tony Moore – lead vocals; Mark Reale – guitars, backing vocals; Don Van Stavern – bass; Bobby Jarzombek – drums	Thundersteel (1988) – remaining tracks; The Privilege of Power (1990)
November 1989 – spring 1990	Tony Moore – lead vocals; Mark Reale – guitars, backing vocals; Mike Flyntz – guitars, backing vocals; Don Van Stavern – bass; Bobby Jarzombek – drums	none
Spring 1990 – 1992	Tony Moore – lead vocals; Mark Reale – guitars, backing vocals; Mike Flyntz – guitars, backing vocals; Pete Perez – bass, backing vocals; Bobby Jarzombek – drums	Riot in Japan – Live!! (1992)
1992–1995	Mike DiMeo – lead vocals, keyboards; Mark Reale – guitars, backing vocals; Mike Flyntz – guitars, backing vocals; Pete Perez – bass, backing vocals; Bobby Jarzombek – drums	Nightbreaker (1993); The Brethren of the Long House (1995) – four tracks
1995–1997	Mike DiMeo – lead vocals, keyboards; Mark Reale – guitars, backing vocals; Mike Flyntz – guitars, backing vocals; Pete Perez – bass, backing vocals; John Macaluso – drums, percussion	The Brethren of the Long House (1995) – remaining tracks
1997 – early 2000	Mike DiMeo – lead vocals, keyboards; Mark Reale – guitars, backing vocals; Mike Flyntz – guitars, backing vocals; Pete Perez – bass, backing vocals; Bobby Jarzombek – drums	Inishmore (1997); Shine On (1998); Sons of Society (1999)
Early – mid-2000	Mike DiMeo – lead vocals, keyboards; Mark Reale – guitars, backing vocals; Mike Flyntz – guitars, backing vocals; Pete Perez – bass, backing vocals; Pat Magrath – drums	none
2001–2002	Mike DiMeo – lead vocals, keyboards; Mark Reale – guitars, backing vocals; Mike Flyntz – guitars, backing vocals; Pete Perez – bass, backing vocals; Bobby Rondinelli – drums	Through the Storm (2002)
October 2003 – January 2005	Mike DiMeo – lead vocals, keyboards; Mark Reale – guitars, backing vocals; Mike Flyntz – guitars, backing vocals; Pete Perez – bass, backing vocals; Frank Gilchriest – drums	Army of One (2006)
February 2005 – December 2008	Mike Tirelli – lead vocals; Mark Reale – guitars, backing vocals; Mike Flyntz – guitars, backing vocals; Pete Perez – bass, backing vocals; Frank Gilchriest – drums	none
December 2008 – December 2009	Tony Moore – lead vocals; Mark Reale – guitars, backing vocals; Mike Flyntz – guitars, backing vocals; Don Van Stavern – bass; Bobby Jarzombek – drums	none
December 2009 – September 2010	Mark Reale – guitars, backing vocals; Mike Flyntz – guitars, backing vocals; Don Van Stavern – bass; Bobby Jarzombek – drums	none
September 2010 – January 2012	Tony Moore – lead vocals; Mark Reale – guitars, backing vocals; Mike Flyntz – guitars, backing vocals; Don Van Stavern – bass; Bobby Jarzombek – drums	Immortal Soul (2011)
January 2012	Tony Moore – lead vocals; Mike Flyntz – guitars, backing vocals; Don Van Stavern – bass; Bobby Jarzombek – drums	none
Band inactive February 2012 – October 2013
November 2013 – January 2014 (as Riot V)	Todd Michael Hall – lead vocals; Mike Flyntz – guitars, backing vocals; Don Van Stavern – bass; Bobby Jarzombek – drums	none
January 2014 – present (as Riot V)	Todd Michael Hall – lead vocals; Mike Flyntz – guitars, backing vocals; Nick Lee – guitars; Don Van Stavern – bass; Frank Gilchriest – drums	Unleash the Fire (2014); Armor of Light (2018); Live at Keep it True Festival 2015 (2018); Live in Japan 2018 (2019)
