= Riot discography =

Cataloging of published recordings by Riot V

Riot V (formerly Riot) discography
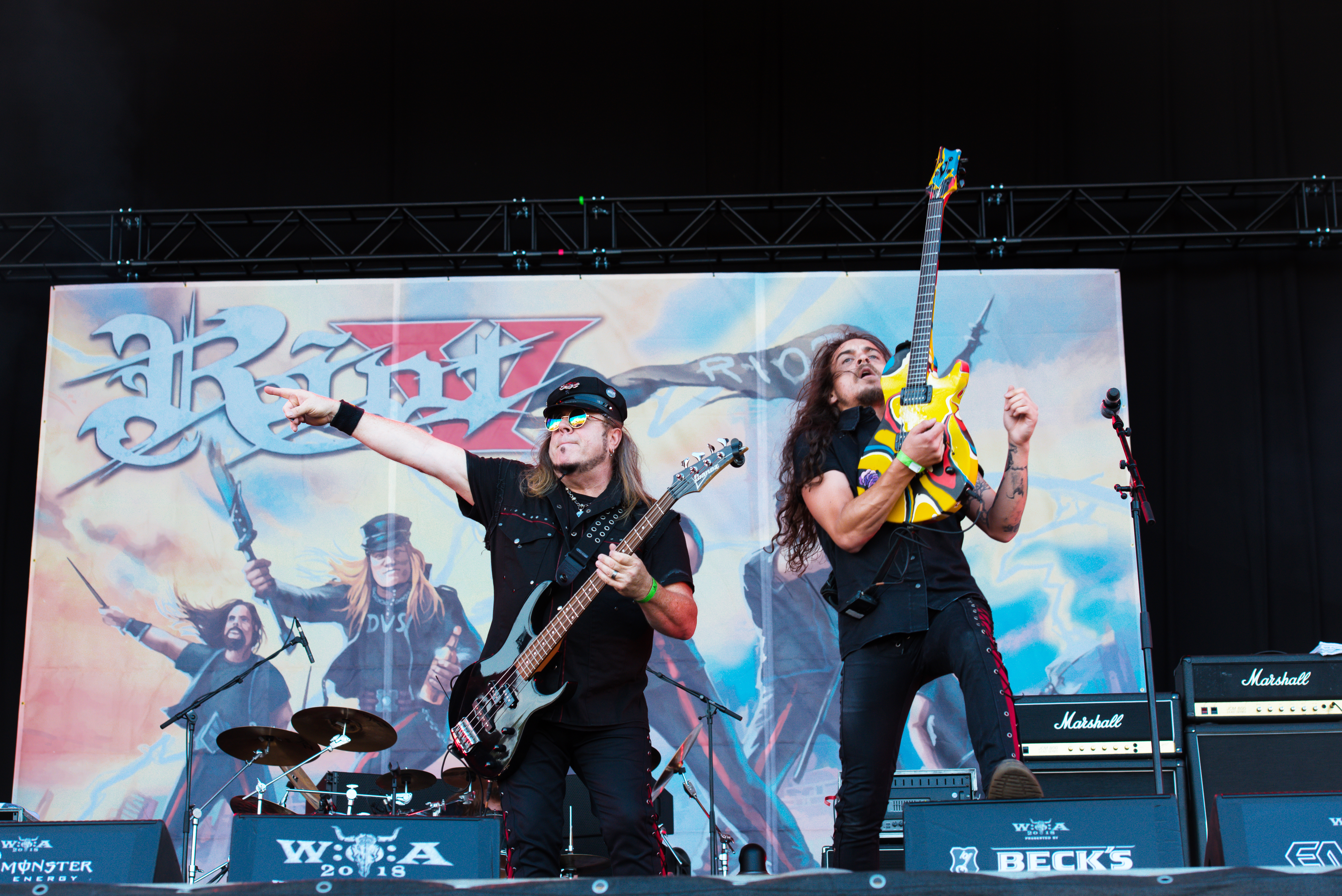
- Riot V performing at Wacken Open Air in 2015
- Studio albums: 17
- Extended plays: 1
- Live albums: 4
- Compilation albums: 1

Riot V, formerly known as Riot, is an American heavy metal band formed in 1975 by guitarist Mark Reale. The band achieved success and popularity during the 1980s. The following is the comprehensive discography of Riot V. To date, they have released seventeen studio albums, four live albums, one compilation album, and one EP.

== Albums ==
=== Studio albums ===
| Title | Album details | Peak chart positions | | | | |
| Title | Album details | US | AUT | GER | SWI | JPN |
|---|---|---|---|---|---|---|
| Rock City | * Released: November 10, 1977: Label: Fire Sign / Elektra; Formats: LP, CS | — | — | — | — | — |
| Narita | * Released: October 5, 1979: Label: Capitol / Victor; Formats: LP, CS | — | — | — | — | — |
| Fire Down Under | * Released: February 9, 1981: Label: Elektra; Formats: LP, CS, 8-track | 49 | — | — | — | — |
| Restless Breed | * Released: May 21, 1982: Label: Elektra; Formats: LP, CS | — | — | — | — | — |
| Born in America | * Released: October 14, 1983: Label: Passport; Formats: LP, CS | — | — | — | — | — |
| Thundersteel | * Released: March 24, 1988: Label: CBS / Epic; Formats: LP, CS, CD | — | — | — | — | — |
| The Privilege of Power | * Released: February 28, 1990: Label: CBS / Epic; Formats: LP, CS, CD | — | — | — | — | — |
| Nightbreaker | * Released: 1993: Label: Sony / Columbia; Formats: CD, CS | — | — | — | — | — |
| The Brethren of the Long House | * Released: 1995: Label: Metal Blade; Formats: CD | — | — | — | — | — |
| Inishmore | * Released: January 27, 1998: Label: Zero Corporation / Metal Blade; Formats: CD | — | — | — | — | — |
| Sons of Society | * Released: September 7, 1999: Label: Zero Corporation / Metal Blade; Formats: CD | — | — | — | — | — |
| Through the Storm | * Released: August 27, 2002: Label: Metal Blade; Formats: CD | — | — | — | — | — |
| Army of One | * Released: July 12, 2006: Label: Metal Blade; Formats: CD | — | — | — | — | — |
| Immortal Soul | * Released: October 31, 2011: Label: Steamhammer / SPV; Formats: CD, LP, digital download | — | — | — | — | — |
| Unleash the Fire | * Released: October 27, 2014: Label: Steamhammer / SPV; Formats: CD, LP, digital download | — | — | — | — | — |
| Armor of Light | * Released: April 27, 2018: Label: Nuclear Blast; Formats: CD, LP, digital download | — | 71 | 27 | 56 | — |
| Mean Streets | * Released: May 10, 2024: Label: Atomic Fire; Formats: CD, LP, digital download | — | — | — | — | — |

=== EPs ===
| Title | Album details | Peak chart positions | | |
| Title | Album details | US | GER | JPN |
|---|---|---|---|---|
| Angel Eyes EP | * Released: 1997: Label: Zero Corporation; Formats: CD; Notes: Released exclusively in Japan. | — | — | — |

=== Live albums ===
| Title | Album details | Peak chart positions | | |
| Title | Album details | US | GER | JPN |
|---|---|---|---|---|
| Riot Live (EP) | * Released: 1982: Label: Elektra; Formats: LP, CS | — | — | — |
| Riot Live | * Released: 1989 (Japan), 1993 (US): Label: CBS / Sony; Formats: CD, LP; Notes: Reissued in 1993 in the US with two bonus tracks ("Train Kept A-Rollin'" and "Road Racin'"). | — | — | — |
| Riot in Japan – Live!! | * Released: 1992: Label: Sony; Formats: CD | — | — | — |
| Shine On | * Released: October 6, 1998: Label: Zero Corporation; Formats: CD | — | — | — |

=== Compilation albums ===
| Title | Album details | Peak chart positions | | |
| Title | Album details | US | GER | JPN |
|---|---|---|---|---|
| Greatest Hits '78–'90 (a.k.a. Starbox) | * Released: 1993: Label: Sony Music Japan; Formats: CD; Notes: Released exclusively in Japan. | — | — | — |

== Music videos ==
=== Riot ===
- "Angel" (1977)
- "Restless Breed" (1982)
- "Born In America" (1983)
- "Bloodstreets" (1988)
- "Glory Calling" (1995)
- "Santa Maria" (1995)
- "Angel Eyes" (1997)

=== Riot V ===
- "Heart Of A Lion" (2018)
- "Feel The Fire" (2024)
- "Mean Streets" (2024)
