= Greatest Hits (Riot album) =

Greatest hits album by Riot
- Released: 1993
- Genre: Hard rock, heavy metal, speed metal, power metal
- Length: 74:14
- Label: Sony Music Japan
- Producer: Steve Loeb

Riot chronology
Riot in Japan – Live!! (1992)	Greatest Hits (1993)	Nightbreaker (1993)

Professional ratings
Review scores
Source	Rating
Allmusic	3/5 stars

Greatest Hits '78-'90 is Riot's only compilation album, released exclusively by Sony Music Japan in 1993. The collection was also issued as a limited edition Starbox.

It contains no material from the Rhett Forrester era, focusing on the Guy Speranza and Tony Moore years only.

== Track listing ==
1. "Warrior" - 3:50 +
2. "49er" - 4:37 ^
3. "Overdrive" - 4:12 +
4. "Kick Down the Wall" - 4:33 ^
5. "Tokyo Rose" - 4:19 +
6. "Road Racin'" - 4:32 ^
7. "Narita" - 4:39 ^
8. "Flight of the Warrior" - 4:19 ~
9. "Metal Soldiers" - 6:39 {}
10. "Runaway" - 5:12 {}
11. "Johnny's Back" - 5:34 ~
12. "Sign of the Crimson Storm" - 4:40 ~
13. "Killer" - 4:53 {}
14. "Storming the Gates of Hell" - 3:43 {}
15. "Bloodstreets" - 4:40 ~
16. "Thundersteel" - 3:52 ~

+ = taken from the album Rock City (1977)
^ = taken from the album Narita (1979)
~ = taken from the album Thundersteel (1988)
{} = taken from the album The Privilege of Power (1990)
