= Masterpieces (HammerFall album) =

Compilation album by HammerFall
- Released: 27 June 2008
- Genre: Power metal, heavy metal
- Length: 66:59
- Label: Nuclear Blast
- Producer: Jens Bogren

HammerFall chronology
Steel Meets Steel - Ten Years of Glory (2007)	Masterpieces (2008)	No Sacrifice, No Victory (2009)

Masterpieces is the third compilation album by Swedish power metal band HammerFall. It consists of cover versions recorded by the band.

The album cover makes references to the bands being covered by HammerFall, including a Twisted Sister logo spray painted on the wall, a shield with the Warlord logo on it, a stone with the Pretty Maids logo, a pumpkin (Helloween), a Japanese Rising Sun Flag (Loudness), an arm holding a guitar buried on the ground (Rising Force) an 'E' logo of Europe, a razor with Swedish steel written on it (Judas Priest) and a sign indicating Detroit referencing Kiss's Detroit Rock City. The Park Av. sign is in reference to Skid Row's "Youth Gone Wild," which contains the lyrics "I tell ya Park Avenue leads to Skid Row." The green-haired zombie is from the cover of Picture's album "Eternal Dark", and the Swedish flag refers to Roger Pontare's representation of Sweden in the 2000 Eurovision Song Contest.

== Tracking list ==
No.	Title	Writer(s)	Original artist	Length
1.	"Child of the Damned"	Bill Tsamis	Warlord	3:42
2.	"Ravenlord"	Harald Spengler	Stormwitch	3:30
3.	"Eternal Dark"	Laurens Bakker-Chriz Van Jaarsveld-Pete Lovell-Henry Van Manen-Rinus Vreugdenhil	Picture	3:08
4.	"Back to Back"	Ronnie Atkins, Ken Hammer, Alan Owen	Pretty Maids	3:38
5.	"I Want Out"	Kai Hansen	Helloween	4:37
6.	"Man on the Silver Mountain"	Ritchie Blackmore, Ronnie James Dio	Rainbow	3:25
7.	"Head Over Heels"	Peter Baltes, Deaffy, Udo Dirkschneider, Herman Frank, Wolf Hoffmann, Stefan Kaufmann	Accept	4:36
8.	"Run with the Devil"	Styrbjörn Wahlquist	Heavy Load	3:36
9.	"We're Gonna Make It"	Dee Snider	Twisted Sister	3:35
10.	"Breaking the Law"	Rob Halford, K. K. Downing, Glenn Tipton	Judas Priest	2:12
11.	"Angel of Mercy"	David T. Chastain	Chastain	5:39
12.	"Rising Force"	Joe Lynn Turner, Yngwie J. Malmsteen	Yngwie Malmsteen	4:29
13.	"Detroit Rock City"	Paul Stanley, Bob Ezrin	Kiss	3:54
14.	"Crazy Nights"	Minoru Niihara, Akira Takasaki	Loudness	3:39
15.	"När vindarna viskar mitt namn"	Peter Dahl, Linda Jansson, Thomas Holmstrand	Roger Pontare	3:07
16.	"Flight of the Warrior*"	Tony Moore, Mark Reale, Don Van Stavern	Riot	4:20
17.	"Youth Gone Wild*"	Rachel Bolan, Dave Sabo	Skid Row	3:18
18.	"Aphasia*"	John Norum	Europe	2:34
Total length:				66:59

== Personnel ==
=== HammerFall ===
- Joacim Cans – vocals (all tracks except track 10)
- Oscar Dronjak – guitar & backing vocals (all tracks), vocals (track 10)
- Glenn Ljungström – guitar (track 1)
- Stefan Elmgren – guitar & backing vocals (tracks 2–15)
- Pontus Norgren – guitar & backing vocals (tracks 16–18)
- Fredrik Larsson – bass & backing vocals (tracks 1, 15–18)
- Magnus Rosén – bass (tracks 2–14)
- Patrik Räfling – drums (tracks 1–5)
- Anders Johansson – drums (tracks 7–18)

"Breaking the Law": all of the band members switched instruments for this version; it features Dronjak as the vocalist, Cans and Rosén on guitars, Räfling on bass, and Elmgren on drums

=== Guest musicians ===
- "I Want Out": vocals, guitar and keyboards by Kai Hansen, backing vocals by Udo Dirkschneider
- "Man on the Silver Mountain": drums by AC, backing vocals by Kai Hansen
- "Head Over Heels": lead vocals by Udo Dirkschneider, backing vocals by Kai Hansen

== Chart positions ==
Positions
Country	Position
Sweden	15
Switzerland	38
Germany	69
