= Riot Live =

Riot Live may refer to:

- Riot Live (EP), an EP by Riot
- Riot Live (album), an album by Riot
