= Angel Eyes (EP) =

EP by Riot
- Released: 1997 (Japan)
- Recorded: Millbrook Sound Studios, Millbrook, New York; Studio M, San Antonio, Texas; Drumstick Sound Production, Dix Hills, New York
- Genre: Heavy metal, speed metal, power metal
- Length: 20:22
- Label: Zero Corporation
- Producer: Mark Reale, Paul Orofino

Riot chronology
The Brethren of the Long House (1995)	Angel Eyes (1997)	Inishmore (1998)

Professional ratings
Review scores
Source	Rating
Collector's Guide to Heavy Metal	7/10

Angel Eyes is an EP by the American heavy metal band Riot, released on December 9, 1997, in Japan only, making it very collectible. It contains two songs from the recording sessions of the album Inishmore not available elsewhere, as well as "Turning the Hands of Time" which is not featured on the Japanese edition of Inishmore.

== Track listing ==
No.	Title	Writer(s)	Length
1.	"Angel Eyes"	Mike DiMeo, Mark Reale, Mike Flyntz	4:29
2.	"15 Rivers"	DiMeo, Reale, Bobby Jarzombek, Pete Perez	5:18
3.	"Red Reign"	DiMeo, Reale	5:27
4.	"Turning the Hands of Time"	DiMeo, Reale	5:08

== Personnel ==
=== Band members ===
- Mike DiMeo – lead vocals, Hammond organ
- Mark Reale – electric lead and rhythm guitars, acoustic 6 and 12 string guitars, backing vocals, mandolin and Hammond organ, string arrangements, producer
- Mike Flyntz – electric lead and rhythm guitars
- Pete Perez – bass
- Bobby Jarzombek – drums

=== Additional musicians ===
- Tony Harnell, Danny Vaughn, Ligaya Perkins – backing vocals
- Kevin Dunne – strings, orchestration, engineer
- Yoko Kayumi – violin

=== Production ===
- Paul Orofino – producer, engineer, mixing
- Jeff Allen, Jack Bart – executive producers
- Marius Perron, Bryan Scott – engineers
- Jim Littleton – assistant engineer
- Joseph M. Palmaccio – mastering
