= Riot Live (album) =

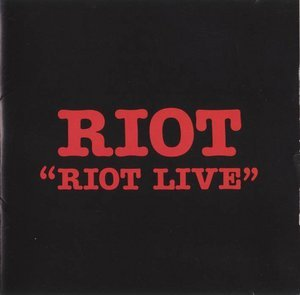

Live album by Riot
- Released: 1989
- Recorded: Monsters of Rock Festival, Donington Park, Castle Donington, UK, August 16, 1980; Hammersmith Odeon, London, UK, April 19/20, 1980.
- Genre: Heavy metal
- Length: 69:13
- Label: CBS/Sony Music
- Producer: Steve Loeb

Riot chronology
| Thundersteel (1988) | Riot Live (1989) | The Privilege of Power (1990) |

Professional ratings
Review scores
| Source | Rating |
|---|---|
| The Collector's Guide to Heavy Metal | 9/10 |

Riot Live (not to be confused with the 1982 EP of the same name with Rhett Forrester on vocals) is Riot's first full-length live album, recorded in the UK in 1980, but not issued until 1989 on CBS/Sony Music in Japan. This is the band's last output with original vocalist Guy Speranza.

The album contains a cover of the well known 1950s rock'n'roll classic, "Train Kept A-Rollin'", brought to prominence in the 1960s and 1970s by the likes of The Yardbirds, Led Zeppelin, and Aerosmith.

Riot Live finally saw an American release in 1993 via Metal Blade Records. Although the U.S. re-issue front cover lists the Fire Down Under (1981) line-up, no songs from that album are included on Riot Live, most likely because Fire Down Under had not been released or even recorded yet. Furthermore, the Metal Blade Records Release clearly states that both concerts were recorded Live in England in 1980.

The first Japanese release stated part of the recording to be from a Hammersmith Odeon 1981 concert. However, according to the Hammersmith Odeon concert history website, Riot never played the venue in 1981, but they played there on Saturday, April 19, 1980 & Sunday, April 20, 1980, as part of the Tour supporting Sammy Hagar. It is therefore more likely that the cover info from the initial Japanese release is incorrect and that the error was corrected with the later U.S. release.

== Track listing ==
| No. | Title | Length |
|---|---|---|
| 1. | "Intro" | 0:56 |
| 2. | "Angel" | 3:42 |
| 3. | "Do It Up" | 3:44 |
| 4. | "Road Racin'" | 5:06 |
| 5. | "White Rock" | 2:54 |
| 6. | "Warrior" | 9:08 |
| 7. | "Narita" | 3:53 |
| 8. | "Tokyo Rose" | 4:49 |
| 9. | "Overdrive" | 8:30 |
| 10. | "Rock City" | 4:52 |
| 11. | "Back on the Non-Stop" | 4:17 |
| 12. | "Kick Down the Wall" | 4:34 |
| 13. | "Train Kept A-Rollin'" (Tiny Bradshaw cover) | 5:43 |
| 14. | "Road Racin'" | 7:35 |

- Tracks 1–5 and 7–8 recorded April 19 and/or 20, 1980 at the Hammersmith Odeon.
- Tracks 6 and 9–14 recorded August 16, 1980 at the Monsters of Rock festival in Donington Park.

== Musicians ==
- Guy Speranza – vocals
- Mark Reale – guitar
- Rick Ventura – guitar
- Kip Leming – bass
- Sandy Slavin – drums
