= Bring the Hammer Down =

Bring the Hammer Down can mean:

- "Bring the Hammer Down", a song from the 1982 album Wiped Out by Raven
- "Bring the Hammer Down", a song from the 2009 album No Sacrifice, No Victory by HammerFall
- "Bring the Hammer Down", a song from the 2014 album Unleash the Fire by Riot V
