= Born in the U.S.A. (disambiguation) =

Born in the U.S.A. is a 1984 album by Bruce Springsteen.

Born in the U.S.A. may also refer to:

- "Born in the U.S.A." (song), the title track of the Springsteen album
- Born in the U.S.A Tour, the tour supporting the release of the Springsteen album
- Born in the U.S.A., an album by Finnish rapper Ruudolf
- Born in the U.S.A., the original title of the Paul Schrader film Light of Day

== See also ==
- Birthright citizenship in the United States
- Born in America, a 1983 album by Riot
- Demographics of the United States
