= Narita (album) =

Studio album by Riot
- Released: 5 October 1979
- Recorded: April–June 1979
- Studios: Big Apple Recording Studio, New York City
- Genre: Heavy metal
- Length: 43:15
- Labels: Victor (Japan), Capitol
- Producers: Steve Loeb and Billy Arnell

Riot chronology
Rock City (1977)	Narita (1979)	Fire Down Under (1981)

Professional ratings
Review scores
Source	Rating
AllMusic	3.5/5 stars
Billboard	(favourable)

Narita is the second studio album by the American heavy metal band Riot. The album was initially released in 1979. It became out of print in the late 1980s and was only being pressed in CD format in Japan in 1989 until the early 1990s. It was finally issued on CD outside Japan in 2005 by UK-based Rock Candy Records, run by former Kerrang! writers Derek Oliver and Dante Bonutto.

'Narita' was also the name of a short-lived San Antonio, Texas-based Riot offshoot, featuring guitarist Mark Reale along with former S.A. Slayer members vocalist Steve Cooper, drummer Dave McClain, and bassist Don Van Stavern, who would later appear on the Thundersteel and The Privilege of Power albums and is a member of Riot V. They recorded a three-song demo in 1985, including an early version of "Thundersteel", before Reale reformed Riot in 1986.

Despite the overall positive reception, various outlets criticized the album cover due to its absurd imagery, with Noisecreep putting it as the second worst cover from otherwise well received musicians.

== Track listing ==
All songs were written by Guy Speranza and Mark Reale except where noted.

Side one
No.	Title	Writer(s)	Length
1.	"Waiting for the Taking"	Speranza, Reale, Rick Ventura	5:01
2.	"49er"	Speranza, Reale, Lou A. Kouvaris	4:36
3.	"Kick Down the Wall"	Lou A. Kouvaris	4:32
4.	"Born to Be Wild" (Steppenwolf cover)	Mars Bonfire	2:47
5.	"Narita"		4:38

Side two
No.	Title	Writer(s)	Length
6.	"Here We Come Again"		5:58
7.	"Do It Up"		3:44
8.	"Hot for Love"		5:00
9.	"White Rock"	Speranza, Reale, Kouvaris	2:33
10.	"Road Racin'"		4:32

== Personnel ==
=== Riot ===
- Guy Speranza – vocals
- Mark Reale – guitar
- Rick Ventura – guitar
- Jimmy Iommi – bass
- Peter Bitelli – drums

== Cover versions and appearances ==
- American metal band Night Demon covered "Road Racin'" on their 2015 album Curse of the Damned; the song is included on the CD digipak version on Century Media and the 12" vinyl version on SPV/Steamhammer.
- The songs "Narita" and "Road Racin'" are featured in the video game Brütal Legend.
- The song "Road Racin" was included on the Polydor album Castle Donnington: Monsters of Rock, from the concert August 1980.

== See also ==
- Narita International Airport（Sanrizuka Struggle）
