= Riot in Japan – Live!! =

Live album by Riot
- Released: 1992
- Recorded: June 1990
- Genre: Heavy metal, hard rock, speed metal
- Length: 66:26
- Label: Sony Music Japan
- Producer: Steve Loeb

Riot chronology
| The Privilege of Power (1990) | Riot in Japan – Live!! (1992) | Nightbreaker (1993) |

1999 US edition cover

Professional ratings
Review scores
| Source | Rating |
|---|---|
| AllMusic | 3/5 stars |
| Collector's Guide to Heavy Metal | 8/10 |

Riot in Japan – Live!! is the second live album by the American heavy metal band Riot, recorded in June 1990 in Osaka and Tokyo, and first released in 1992 by Sony Music Japan. It marks the debut of bassist Pete Perez (Karion, Spastic Ink) who replaced Don Van Stavern at the end of the U.S. leg of The Privilege of Power tour. This album was taken from Front of House console mixes by sound man George Geranios. There was no multi-track recording made.

In 1999, the album was issued in the U.S. as Live in Japan by Metal Blade Records. Both pressings contain a studio version of the Deep Purple classic "Smoke on the Water", recorded at Greene St. Recording in New York during The Privilege of Power sessions and featuring a special guest appearance by The New West Horns.

== Track listing ==
| No. | Title | Length |
|---|---|---|
| 1. | "Minutes to Showtime" | 2:02 |
| 2. | "On Your Knees... in Tokyo!" | 3:53 |
| 3. | "Metal Soldiers" | 4:43 |
| 4. | "Runaway" | 5:15 |
| 5. | "Tokyo Rose... in Osaka!" | 2:25 |
| 6. | "Rock City" | 3:16 |
| 7. | "Outlaw" | 4:19 |
| 8. | "Killer" | 4:43 |
| 9. | "Skins & Bones, Part 1" (drum solo) | 3:17 |
| 10. | "Skins & Bones, Part 2" (drum solo) | 2:00 |
| 11. | "Johnny's Back... in Tokyo!" | 5:24 |
| 12. | "Flight of the Warrior" | 4:08 |
| 13. | "Ladies and Gentlemen... Mark Reale" (guitar solo) | 3:09 |
| 14. | "Japan Cakes" (guitar solo) | 2:22 |
| 15. | "Narita" | 2:09 |
| 16. | "Warrior" | 5:39 |
| 17. | "The Dressing Room the Encore Begins... in Tokyo!/The Encore Continues..." | 3:02 |
| 18. | "Smoke on the Water... in New York" (Deep Purple cover) | 4:33 |

== Musicians ==
- Tony Moore – vocals
- Mark Reale – guitar
- Mike Flyntz – guitar
- Pete Perez – bass
- Bobby Jarzombek – drums
