= Nightbreaker =

- Original Japanese edition cover

Studio album by Riot
- Released: July 22, 1993
- Recorded: Greene St. Recording, New York City, 1992–1993
- Genre: Heavy metal, speed metal, power metal
- Length: 56:34
- Label: Sony; Combat Pay; Rising Sun/SPV
- Producer: Mark Reale, Steve Loeb

Riot chronology
Riot in Japan – Live!! (1992)	Nightbreaker (1993)	The Brethren of the Long House (1995)

European edition cover

1999 US edition cover

Professional ratings
Review scores
Source	Rating
AllMusic	4/5 stars
Collector's Guide to Heavy Metal	7/10
No Life 'til Metal	(favorable)

Nightbreaker is the eighth studio album by American heavy metal band Riot. It was the band's first release with vocalist Mike DiMeo, as well as the studio debut of guitarist Mike Flyntz and bassist Pete Perez.

The album was released in Japan by Sony Music in 1993, in Europe by Rising Sun Productions in 1994, and finally re-issued in the United States by Metal Blade Records in 1999, all with different cover artwork. A very limited run of CDs, bearing the Combat Pay Music label and utilizing the Japanese artwork, was also produced in 1993 by the band's management.

"Burn" is a cover of the title track of Deep Purple's album of 1974; "A Whiter Shade of Pale" is a cover Procol Harum's hit single of 1967; "Outlaw" is a re-recorded song from Riot's 1981 album Fire Down Under.

== Track listing ==
No.	Title	Writer(s)	Length
1.	"Soldier"	Mark Reale	4:54
2.	"Destiny"	Mike DiMeo, Mike Flyntz	4:42
3.	"Burn" (Deep Purple cover)	David Coverdale, Ritchie Blackmore, Jon Lord, Ian Paice	6:01
4.	"In Your Eyes"	DiMeo, Reale	4:34
5.	"Nightbreaker"	Reale	4:12
6.	"Medicine Man"	Reale	5:36
7.	"Silent Scream"	DiMeo, Reale, Flyntz	5:07
8.	"Magic Maker"	Reale	5:10
9.	"A Whiter Shade of Pale" (Procol Harum cover)	Keith Reid, Gary Brooker	4:59
10.	"Babylon"	DiMeo, Reale	5:05
11.	"Outlaw"	Reale, Guy Speranza	6:14

=== Japanese edition bonus track ===
No.	Title	Writer(s)	Length
12.	"Black Mountain Woman"	Reale	5:07

=== 1999 US edition bonus track ===
No.	Title	Writer(s)	Length
12.	"Faded Hero"	Reale	5:32

Note:

- On the European Rising Sun Prod. pressing, "A Whiter Shade of Pale" is replaced with "I'm on the Run" (4:56)

== Personnel ==
=== Band members ===
- Mike DiMeo – vocals
- Mark Reale – guitar, producer
- Mike Flyntz – guitar
- Pete Perez – bass
- Bobby Jarzombek – drums

=== Production ===
- Steve Loeb – producer, executive producer
- Rod Hui – engineer, mixing
