= Riot Live (EP) =

Live album EP by Riot
- Released: 1982
- Recorded: 5 July 1982
- Venue: New Peppermint Lounge, New York City
- Genre: Heavy metal
- Length: 30:22
- Label: Elektra
- Producer: Steve Loeb and Billy Arnell

Riot chronology
Restless Breed (1982)	Riot Live (1982)	Born in America (1983)

Professional ratings
Review scores
Source	Rating
The Collector's Guide to Heavy Metal	7/10

Riot Live is the first official extended play live recording by New York City heavy metal band Riot. Released in 1982, it followed on the heels of Restless Breed, the group's first studio album with vocalist Rhett Forrester. It was issued with different cover artwork in Europe.

While never made available on CD as a stand-alone release, the EP was included as bonus tracks on the 1997 Restless Breed CD re-issue by German label High Vaultage. However, the 6 songs were left off the original 1999 U.S. Restless Breed re-issue on Metal Blade Records but were eventually included on the 2016 re-issue, also released by Metal Blade.

== Track listing ==
No.	Title	Length
1.	"Hard Lovin' Man"	3:09
2.	"Showdown"	4:30
3.	"Loved by You"	8:02
4.	"Loanshark"	5:27
5.	"Restless Breed"	5:11
6.	"Swords and Tequila"	3:57

== Personnel ==
- Rhett Forrester – vocals
- Mark Reale – guitars
- Rick Ventura – guitars
- Kip Leming – bass
- Sandy Slavin – drums
