= The Brethren of the Long House =

Studio album by Riot
- Released: November 11, 1995
- Recorded: Greene St. Recording, New York City, January–June 1995
- Genre: Heavy metal, speed metal, power metal
- Length: 59:30
- Label: Sony, Rising Sun, Metal Blade
- Producer: Steve Loeb, Rod Hui, Mark Reale

Riot chronology
Nightbreaker (1993)	The Brethren of the Long House (1995)	Angel Eyes (EP) (1997)

Professional ratings
Review scores
Source	Rating
AllMusic	4/5 stars
Collector's Guide to Heavy Metal	8/10

The Brethren of the Long House is Riot's ninth studio album. It was first released in Japan on November 11, 1995, in Germany in 1996, and eventually in the United States in 1999. The album is dedicated to the lost culture of American Indians.

== Track listing ==
No.	Title	Writer(s)	Length
1.	"Intro/The Last of the Mohicans"	Trevor Jones	1:41
2.	"Glory Calling"	Mike DiMeo, Mark Reale	5:11
3.	"Rolling Thunder"	DiMeo, Mike Flyntz	3:56
4.	"Rain"	DiMeo, Reale	4:58
5.	"Wounded Heart"	DiMeo, Reale	3:56
6.	"The Brethren of the Long House"	DiMeo, Flyntz	5:24
7.	"Out in the Fields"	Gary Moore	4:03
8.	"Santa Maria"	DiMeo, Reale	3:50
9.	"Blood of the English"	DiMeo, Reale	5:49
10.	"Ghost Dance"	DiMeo, Reale, Flyntz, Pete Perez, Bobby Jarzombek	5:35
11.	"Shenandoah"	Traditional Arrangement	3:57
12.	"Holy Land"	DiMeo, Reale	4:47
13.	"The Last of the Mohicans (Reprise)"	Jones	6:26
14.	"Sailor" (US 1999 re-release bonus track)		6:16

== Personnel ==
=== Band members ===
- Mike DiMeo – lead and backing vocals, keyboards
- Mark Reale – guitars, backing vocals, producer
- Mike Flyntz – guitars
- Pete Perez – bass
- John Macaluso – drums, cover art

=== Additional musicians ===
- Bobby Jarzombek – drums on tracks 1, 4, 12, 13, 14
- Steve Loeb – keyboards, strings, backing vocals, orchestration, producer
- Kevin Dunne, Phil Mangalanous, Steve Briody – strings, orchestration
- David L. Spier – trumpet

=== Production ===
- Rod Hui – engineer, mixing, producer
- Danny Mardosky, Phil Painson, Joshua Wertheimer – engineers
