= Armor of Light =

Studio album by Riot V
- Released: April 27, 2018
- Recorded: 2017
- Genre: Heavy metal, power metal, speed metal
- Length: 55:26
- Label: Nuclear Blast
- Producer: Chris Collier & Riot V

Riot V chronology
Unleash the Fire (2014)	Armor of Light (2018)	Mean Streets (2024)

Armor of Light is the sixteenth studio album by the American heavy metal band Riot, now called Riot V, released on April 27, 2018, through Nuclear Blast Records. It is Riot's second album not featuring long-time guitarist and founder, Mark Reale who died in 2012.

== Track listing ==
No.	Title	Length
1.	"Victory"	4:40
2.	"End of the World"	5:09
3.	"Messiah"	4:20
4.	"Angel's Thunder, Devil's Reign"	4:40
5.	"Burn the Daylight"	4:47
6.	"Heart of a Lion"	3:52
7.	"Armor of Light"	4:36
8.	"Set the World Alight"	4:52
9.	"San Antonio"	3:49
10.	"Caught in the Witches Eye"	4:56
11.	"Ready to Shine"	5:00
12.	"Raining Fire"	4:45

== Personnel ==
=== Band members ===
- Todd Michael Hall – lead vocals
- Mike Flyntz – guitar
- Nick Lee – guitar
- Don Van Stavern – bass
- Frank Gilchriest – drums

=== Production ===
- Chris Collier – production, mastering
- Bruno Ravel – co-production, engineering
- Mariusz Gandzel – artwork
- Timo Pollinger – artwork (additional), layout

== Charts ==
Chart (2018)	Peak position
Austrian Albums (Ö3 Austria)	71
German Albums (Offizielle Top 100)	27
Swiss Albums (Schweizer Hitparade)	56
