= Immortal Soul =

Studio album by Riot
- Released: October 21, 2011
- Genre: Heavy metal, power metal, speed metal
- Length: 53:02
- Label: SPV/Steamhammer; Marquee/Avalon (Japan)
- Producer: Bruno Ravel & Riot

Riot chronology
Army of One (2006)	Immortal Soul (2011)	Unleash the Fire (2014)

Professional ratings
Review scores
Source	Rating
Blabbermouth.net	8/10
Brave Words & Bloody Knuckles	7.5/10
Sputnikmusic	4/5

Immortal Soul is the fourteenth studio album by American heavy metal band Riot, released in Japan on October 21, 2011, through Marquee/Avalon, with Steamhammer Records handling releases in Europe (October 26–31, 2011) and the United States and Canada (November 22, 2011). It marked the short-lived return of the Thundersteel touring line-up featuring vocalist Tony Moore, guitarists Mark Reale and Mike Flyntz, bassist Don Van Stavern, and drummer Bobby Jarzombek. It is the last Riot album to feature Moore, Jarzombek and long-time guitarist Mark Reale, who at the time was the only original member left in the band, before his death in January 2012.

After Reale's death, Van Stavern and Flyntz decided to carry on touring the world and releasing new studio material, under the name Riot V.

== Track listing ==
All songs composed by Riot.

Standard edition
No.	Title	Writer(s)	Length
1.	"Riot"	Van Stavern, Moore	5:03
2.	"Still Your Man"	Van Stavern, Moore	4:16
3.	"Crawling"	Flyntz, Moore, Van Stavern	5:52
4.	"Wings Are for Angels"	Flyntz, Moore	5:10
5.	"Fall Before Me"	Flyntz, Moore	4:55
6.	"Sins of the Father"	Van Stavern, Moore	3:55
7.	"Majestica"	Flyntz	0:57
8.	"Immortal Soul"	Reale, Moore	4:46
9.	"Insanity"	Flyntz, Moore	4:40
10.	"Whiskey Man"	Reale, Moore, Van Stavern	4:15
11.	"Believe"	Reale, Moore, Van Stavern	4:17
12.	"Echoes"	Reale, Moore	4:53

== Personnel ==
=== Band members ===
- Tony Moore – lead vocals
- Mark Reale – guitar
- Mike Flyntz – guitar
- Don Van Stavern – bass
- Bobby Jarzombek – drums

=== Production ===
- Bruno Ravel – producer, engineer, mixing, mastering
- Joe Floyd – engineer, mixing
- Paul Orofino – engineer
