= Todd Michael Hall =

American singer

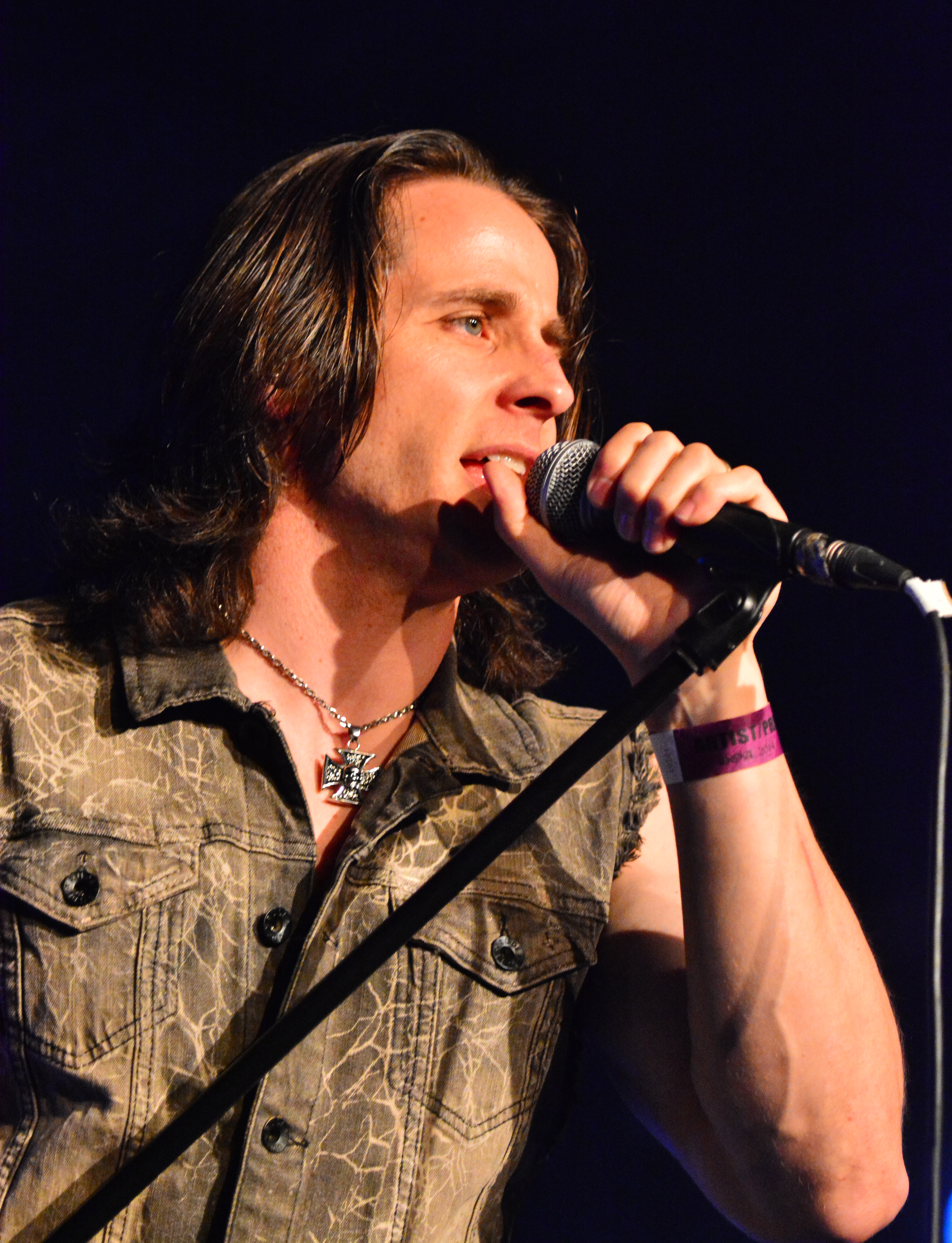
Todd Michael Hall from Riot V at Headbangers Open Air 2014

Todd Michael Hall (born September 27, 1969, in Saginaw, Michigan) is an American musician best known as the former lead singer for New York–based band Riot V.

== Personal life ==
He has been in the band since 2013 and is their fifth official singer. Hall has also sung in many other metal bands including Reverence, Jack Starr's Burning Starr, and Harlet.

Todd was a contestant on Season 18 of The Voice.

Todd is married to Lumpeny after a long-distance relationship. They have three children together.

== Discography ==
=== With Harlet ===
- Virgin Wings (EP, 1987)
- 25 Gets a Ride (1988)

=== With Pulling Teeth ===
- Pulling Teeth (1994)

=== With Jack Starr's Burning Starr ===
- Defiance (2009)
- Land of the Dead (2011)
- Stand Your Ground (2017)

=== With Reverence ===
- When Darkness Calls (2012)
- Gods of War (2015)

=== With Riot V ===
- Unleash the Fire (2014)
- Armor of Light (2018)
- Mean Streets (2024)

=== With Avalon ===
- Return to Eden (2019)

=== Solo ===
- Letters from India (2017)
- Earth (EP, 2019)
- Air (EP, 2019)
- Fire (EP, 2019)
- Water (EP, 2019)
- Sonic Healing (2021)
- No Winner Takes All (2022)
- Off the Rails (2024)
