= Restless Breed =

Studio album by Riot
- Released: May 21, 1982
- Recorded: Greene St. Recording, New York City
- Genre: Heavy metal, hard rock
- Length: 38:38
- Label: Elektra
- Producer: Steve Loeb, Billy Arnell

Riot chronology
Fire Down Under (1981)	Restless Breed (1982)	Riot Live (EP) (1982)

Professional ratings
Review scores
Source	Rating
AllMusic	2.5/5 stars
The Collector's Guide to Heavy Metal	8/10

Restless Breed is the fourth studio album by American heavy metal band Riot, released on May 21, 1982. It was the band's first record with vocalist Rhett Forrester. "When I Was Young" is an Eric Burdon and the Animals' cover.

Restless Breed was first re-issued on CD in 1997 by Germany's High Vaultage label, including the Riot Live six-song EP as bonus tracks. A stateside re-issue followed in 1999 on Metal Blade Records, albeit sans the EP bonus tracks.

Metal Blade would re-issue the album a second time in 2016, this time including the Riot Live EP as bonus tracks. Rock Candy Records reissued a remastered CD of the album in 2019

Metal Hammer included the album cover on their list of "50 most hilariously ugly rock and metal album covers ever".

== Track listing ==
Side one
No.	Title	Writer(s)	Length
1.	"Hard Lovin' Man"	Rhett Forrester, Doug Salomone	2:48
2.	"C.I.A."	Forrester	3:43
3.	"Restless Breed"	Mark Reale	5:11
4.	"When I Was Young" (Eric Burdon and The Animals cover)	Eric Burdon, Vic Briggs, John Weider, Barry Jenkins, Danny McCulloch	3:25
5.	"Loanshark"	Reale, Forrester, Kip Leming	4:10

Side two
No.	Title	Writer(s)	Length
6.	"Loved by You"	Ventura	5:37
7.	"Over to You"	Ventura	3:42
8.	"Showdown"	Reale	3:49
9.	"Dream Away"	Ventura	3:43
10.	"Violent Crimes"	Leming, Forrester	2:30

=== 2016 CD edition bonus tracks ===
No.	Title	Length
11.	"Hard Lovin' Man"	3:09
12.	"Showdown"	4:30
13.	"Loved by You"	8:02
14.	"Loanshark"	5:27
15.	"Restless Breed"	5:11
16.	"Swords and Tequila"	3:57

== Personnel ==
=== Riot ===
- Rhett Forrester – vocals, harmonica
- Mark Reale – guitar
- Rick Ventura – guitar
- Kip Leming – bass
- Sandy Slavin – drums

=== Production ===
- Recorded and mixed at Greene St. Recording, New York City
- Produced by Steve Loeb and Billy Arnell
- Engineered by Rod Hui
- Assistant engineer – Frank Scilingo
- Mastered at Masterdisk by Howie Weinberg
- Front cover illustration by Kid Kane
- Original concept by Steven Weiss
