= Shine On (Riot album) =

Live album by Riot
- Released: October 6, 1998
- Recorded: Japan Tour 1998
- Genres: Heavy metal, hard rock, speed metal
- Length: 72:20
- Labels: Zero Corporation (Japan), Metal Blade
- Producers: Mark Reale, Paul Orofino, Jeff Allen

Riot chronology
Inishmore (1998)	Shine On (1998)	Sons of Society (1999)

Japanese edition cover

Professional ratings
Review scores
Source	Rating
AllMusic	3/5 stars
Collector's Guide to Heavy Metal	6/10
Scream Magazine	3/6

Shine On is the third live album by American heavy metal band Riot, released in 1998 in Japan by Zero Corporation and in the US by Metal Blade Records.

== Track listing ==
No.	Title	Length
1.	"Black Water"	1:47
2.	"Angel Eyes"	4:26
3.	"Soldier"	4:51
4.	"The Man"	4:05
5.	"Kings Are Falling"	4:33
6.	"Bloodstreets"	4:19
7.	"Swords and Tequila"	3:24
8.	"Cry for the Dying"	4:43

Irish Trilogy
No.	Title	Length
9.	"Inishmore (Forsaken Heart)"	1:40
10.	"Inishmore"	4:30
11.	"Danny Boy"	2:49

No.	Title	Length
12.	"Liberty"	5:18
13.	"Gypsy"	5:12
14.	"The Last of the Mohicans (Intro) / Glory Calling"	6:59
15.	"Thundersteel"	4:00
16.	"Outlaw"	4:00
17.	"Warrior"	5:44

=== Japanese release ===
No.	Title	Length
7.	"Watching the Signs"	4:49
16.	"Nightbreaker"	4:27

- In the Japanese release, track 7 "Swords and Tequila" is replaced by "Watching the Signs" and track 16 "Outlaw" by "Nightbreaker".

== Personnel ==
=== Band members ===
- Mike DiMeo – vocals
- Mark Reale – guitar, producer, mixing
- Mike Flyntz – guitar
- Pete Perez – bass
- Bobby Jarzombek – drums

=== Production ===
- Paul Orofino – producer, engineer, mixing
- Jeff Allen – executive producer
