= Army of One (album) =

Studio album by Riot
- Released: July 12, 2006
- Recorded: Soundcheckers Studio, New York City, Milbrook Sound Studios, Millbrook, New York, 2003
- Genre: Heavy metal, speed metal, power metal
- Length: 72:35
- Label: EMI Music Japan; Metal Heaven
- Producer: Mark Reale, Bruno Ravel, Jeff Allen

Riot chronology
Through the Storm (2002)	Army of One (2006)	Immortal Soul (2011)

Army of One is the thirteenth studio album by the American heavy metal band Riot. It was released on July 12, 2006.

According to the official website, the album was recorded in 2003 and Mike DiMeo was effectively out of the band by the time it was released. This would be his last studio album with the band. It is the last Riot album to feature long time bassist Pete Perez and the first to feature drummer Frank Gilchriest, primarily known for his work with the band Virgin Steele.

== Track listing ==
No.	Title	Length
1.	"Army of One (Mark Reale, Mike DiMeo and Mike Flyntz)"	4:23
2.	"Knockin' at My Door (Mark Reale, Mike DiMeo)"	4:19
3.	"Blinded (Mark Reale, Mike DiMeo)"	5:26
4.	"One More Alibi (Mark Reale, Mike DiMeo)"	4:55
5.	"It All Falls Down (Mark Reale, Mike DiMeo)"	5:36
6.	"Helpin' Hand (Mark Reale, Mike DiMeo)"	5:24
7.	"The Mystic (Mark Reale, Mike DiMeo)"	5:43
8.	"Still Alive (Mark Reale, Mike DiMeo)"	5:42
9.	"Alive in the City (Mark Reale, Mike DiMeo)"	7:00
10.	"Shine (Mark Reale, Mike DiMeo)"	6:33
11.	"Stained Mirror (Mark Reale, Mike DiMeo)" (instrumental)	3:46
12.	"Darker Side of Light (Mark Reale, Mike DiMeo)"	6:58

=== Japanese edition bonus track ===
No.	Title	Length
13.	"Road Racin'" (live at Club Citta, Kawasaki, Japan 1998)	6:50

== Personnel ==
=== Band members ===
- Mike DiMeo – lead and backing vocals, Hammond organ
- Mark Reale – electric lead and rhythm guitars, acoustic guitars, banjo, backing vocals, strings arrangements, producer
- Mike Flyntz – electric lead and rhythm guitars
- Pete Perez – bass
- Frank Gilchriest – drums

=== Additional musicians ===
- Bruno Ravel – keyboards, backing vocals, producer, engineer, mixing
- Tony Harnell – backing vocals
- Andy Aledort – guitar solo on "Alive in the City"

=== Production ===
- Jeff Allen – executive producer
- Paul Orofino – engineer, mastering
