= Unleash the Fire =

Studio album by Riot V
- Released: October 22, 2014
- Genre: Heavy metal, power metal, speed metal
- Length: 53:02
- Label: SPV/Steamhammer; Avalon Marquee (Japan)
- Producer: Bruno Ravel, Joshua Block & Riot V

Riot V chronology
Immortal Soul (2011)	Unleash the Fire (2014)	Armor of Light (2018)

Professional ratings
Review scores
Source	Rating
Metal Storm	(mixed)
Sputnikmusic	3.6/5

Unleash the Fire is the fifteenth studio album by the American heavy metal band Riot, now called Riot V, released on August 27, 2014 through Steamhammer Records in Europe. It is Riot's first album not featuring longtime guitarist Mark Reale.

== Track listing ==
Standard edition
No.	Title	Writer(s)	Length
1.	"Ride Hard Live Free"	Don Van Stavern	4:44
2.	"Metal Warrior"	Van Stavern	4:41
3.	"Fall from the Sky"	Mike Flyntz, Todd Michael Hall	5:08
4.	"Bring the Hammer Down"	Van Stavern, Hall	4:26
5.	"Unleash the Fire"	Van Stavern, Hall	4:05
6.	"Land of the Rising Sun"	Van Stavern	4:02
7.	"Kill to Survive"	Flyntz, Frank Gilchriest	5:09
8.	"Return of the Outlaw"	Van Stavern, Hall	3:52
9.	"Immortal"	Van Stavern, Hall	4:20
10.	"Take Me Back"	Flyntz, Hall	4:26
11.	"Fight Fight Fight"	Van Stavern, Hall	4:32
12.	"Until We Meet Again"	Flyntz, Hall	6:31

Japanese edition bonus track
No.	Title	Writer(s)	Length
13.	"Thundersteel" (live at Metal Assault, Germany 2014)	Mark Reale, Van Stavern

== Personnel ==
=== Band members ===
- Todd Michael Hall – lead vocals
- Mike Flyntz – guitar
- Nick Lee – guitar
- Don Van Stavern – bass
- Frank Gilchriest – drums

=== Production ===
- Bruno Ravel – production, mastering
- Joshua Block – co-production, engineer
