= Thundersteel =

1988 studio album by Riot

Studio album by Riot
- Released: March 24, 1988
- Recorded: January 1988 at Greene St. Recording, New York City
- Genre: Power metal
- Length: 46:06
- Label: CBS; Epic (Europe)
- Producer: Steve Loeb, Rod Hui, Mark Reale

Riot chronology
Born in America (1983)	Thundersteel (1988)	Riot Live (1989)

Professional ratings
Review scores
Source	Rating
AllMusic	4.5/5 stars
Classic Rock	5/10 stars
The Collector's Guide to Heavy Metal	7/10 stars
Rock Hard	9/10

Thundersteel is the sixth studio album by the American heavy metal band Riot, released after coming back from a period of inactivity in the mid-1980s. It features a totally different line-up from that of the previous work, with guitarist Mark Reale being the only remaining member.

It was re-issued in 2003 by Collectables Records with slightly amended artwork and re-issued on 180g vinyl as a 2-LP set with The Privilege of Power by SPV on February 25, 2013. The album originally charted at No. 150 on Billboard 200

The song "Thundersteel" was originally written by Mark Reale and Don Van Stavern for 'Narita', a short-lived project Reale formed with members of S.A. Slayer following the demise of Riot in 1984. A demo released by Narita exists, with "Thundersteel" and two other tracks: "Liar" and "The Feeling Is Gone". The record's title song appears as a bonus track on 2013 album "Possession" by the Polish heavy metal band Crystal Viper.

The song "Flight of the Warrior" was covered by the Swedish heavy metal band HammerFall on their 2008 album Masterpieces. A cover of "Flight of the Warrior" also appears as a bonus track on the 2013 album Beneath the Surface by German metal band Alpha Tiger who've performed the song live as well.

== Album information ==
The album's sound has been described as power metal; with AllMusic writer Brian O'Neill going into great detail describing what all went into its sound, saying, "The disc takes cues from everything that was metal at the time, combining classic European styles reminiscent of Judas Priest's heavier moments (a premonition for Painkiller), thrashing guitars and pounding percussion indicative of the then-burgeoning underground thrash movement (it's got more riffs than Anthrax ever had), and undertones of the hair metal that was riding the charts at the time (especially in appearance) into a cohesive moment of refined ferocity."

== Legacy ==
In 2008, the album's personnel reunited for 2009's Sweden Rock Festival. The album was reissued in Japan on October 7, 2009. A 30th anniversary version of the album was released in 2018.

== Track listing ==
No.	Title	Writer(s)	Length
1.	"Thundersteel"	Reale, Van Stavern	3:49
2.	"Fight or Fall"	Van Stavern	4:25
3.	"Sign of the Crimson Storm"	Reale	4:40
4.	"Flight of the Warrior"	Moore, Reale, Van Stavern	4:17
5.	"On Wings of Eagles"	Moore, Reale, Van Stavern	5:41
6.	"Johnny's Back"	Moore, Reale, Van Stavern	5:32
7.	"Bloodstreets"	Moore, Reale	4:39
8.	"Run for Your Life"	Moore, Reale, Van Stavern	4:08
9.	"Buried Alive (Tell Tale Heart)"	Moore, Reale, Van Stavern, Jarzombek, Bob Held, Steve Loeb	8:55
Total length:			46:06

== Personnel ==
=== Riot ===
- Tony Moore – vocals
- Mark Reale – guitars, producer
- Don Van Stavern – bass
- Bobby Jarzombek – drums

=== Additional musicians ===
- Mark Edwards (Steeler, Third Stage Alert, Lion) – drums on tracks 2, 3, 5 & 7

=== Production ===
- Steve Loeb – producer
- Rod Hui – producer, engineer, mixing
- Nick Sansano – engineer
- Chris Shaw, Matt Tritto – assistant engineers
- Howie Weinberg – mastering
