= Inishmore (album) =

Studio album by Riot
- Released: November 11, 1997
- Recorded: Millbrook Sound Studios, Millbrook, New York; Studio M, San Antonio, Texas; Drumstick Sound Production, Dix Hills, New York
- Genres: Heavy metal, speed metal, power metal
- Length: 51:21
- Labels: Zero (Japan), Metal Blade
- Producers: Mark Reale, Paul Orofino

Riot chronology
Angel Eyes (EP) (1997)	Inishmore (1997)	Shine On (1998)

Professional ratings
Review scores
Source	Rating
AllMusic	2.5/5 stars
Collector's Guide to Heavy Metal	7/10
Scream Magazine	5/6

Inishmore is the tenth studio album by American heavy metal band Riot. It was originally released in Japan on November 11, 1997, two months before it was eventually released in the US on January 27, 1998. The album is based on conceptual sagas of Celtic and Irish myths.

== Track listing ==
All tracks by Mark Reale and Mike DiMeo, except where indicated.

No.	Title	Writer(s)	Length
1.	"Black Water" (instrumental)	Reale	2:42
2.	"Angel Eyes"	Reale, DiMeo, Mike Flyntz	4:27
3.	"Liberty"		5:08
4.	"Kings Are Falling"		4:33
5.	"The Man"		3:52
6.	"Watching the Signs"		4:35
7.	"Should I Run"	Flyntz, DiMeo	4:40
8.	"Cry for the Dying"		4:39
9.	"Turning the Hands of Time"	Flyntz, DiMeo	5:08
10.	"Gypsy"		5:20
11.	"Inishmore (Forsaken Heart)"	Reale	1:45
12.	"Inishmore" (instrumental)	Reale	4:32

=== Japanese release ===
No.	Title	Writer(s)	Length
12.	"Danny Boy"	Reale	3:40

- The Japanese edition omits track 9 and adds the following bonus track "Danny Boy."

== Personnel ==
=== Band members ===
- Mike DiMeo – lead vocals, Hammond organ
- Mark Reale – electric lead and rhythm guitars, acoustic 6 and 12 string guitars, backing vocals, mandolin and Hammond organ, string arrangements, producer
- Mike Flyntz – electric lead and rhythm guitars
- Pete Perez – bass
- Bobby Jarzombek – drums

=== Additional musicians ===
- Tony Harnell, Danny Vaughn, Ligaya Perkins – backing vocals
- Kevin Dunne – strings, orchestration, engineer
- Yoko Kayumi – violin

=== Production ===
- Paul Orofino – producer, engineer, mixing
- Jeff Allen, Jack Bart – executive producers
- Marius Perron, Bryan Scott – engineers
- Jim Littleton – assistant engineer
- Joseph M. Palmaccio – mastering
