= Through the Storm (Riot album) =

Studio album by Riot
- Released: August 26, 2002
- Recorded: Millbrook Sound Studios, Millbrook, New York, Tri-Star Sounds, Long Island, New York
- Genre: Heavy metal, hard rock
- Length: 51:16
- Label: Toshiba EMI Japan; Metal Blade
- Producer: Mark Reale, Paul Orofino

Riot chronology
Sons of Society (1999)	Through the Storm (2002)	Army of One (2006)

Professional ratings
Review scores
Source	Rating
AllMusic	3.5/5 stars

Through the Storm is the twelfth studio album by American heavy metal band Riot. It was released on August 26, 2002.

It is the only Riot album to feature drummer Bobby Rondinelli, best known for his work with Rainbow and Black Sabbath.

== Track listing ==
No.	Title	Writer(s)	Length
1.	"Turn the Tables"	Mike DiMeo, Mark Reale, Mike Flyntz	5:21
2.	"Lost Inside This World"	DiMeo, Reale	4:44
3.	"Chains (Revolving)"	DiMeo, Reale	4:43
4.	"Through the Storm"	DiMeo, Reale	6:13
5.	"Let It Show"	DiMeo, Reale	4:37
6.	"Burn the Sun"	DiMeo, Reale, Flyntz	4:26
7.	"To My Head"	DiMeo, Reale	5:59
8.	"Essential Enemies"	DiMeo, Reale, Flyntz	3:48
9.	"Somebody" (Japanese edition bonus track)	DiMeo, Reale	3:42
10.	"Only You Can Rock Me" (UFO cover)	Pete Way, Phil Mogg, Michael Schenker	3:56
11.	"Isle of Shadows"	DiMeo, Reale, Flyntz	4:08
12.	"Here Comes the Sun" (The Beatles cover)	George Harrison	3:21

== Personnel ==
=== Band members ===
- Mike DiMeo – lead and backing vocals
- Mark Reale – electric and acoustic guitars, keyboards, string arrangements, producer
- Mike Flyntz – electric guitars, engineer
- Pete Perez – bass
- Bobby Rondinelli – drums

=== Additional musicians ===
- Yoko Kayumi – violin, violin effects, keyboards
- Josh Pincus – keyboards on "Only You Can Rock Me"
- Tony Harnell – backing vocals

=== Production ===
- Paul Orofino – producer, engineer, mixing, mastering
- Chris Cubeta, Bruno Ravel, Bobby Jarzombek – engineers
- Jeff Allen, Jack Bart – executive producers
