= Mike DiMeo =

American singer

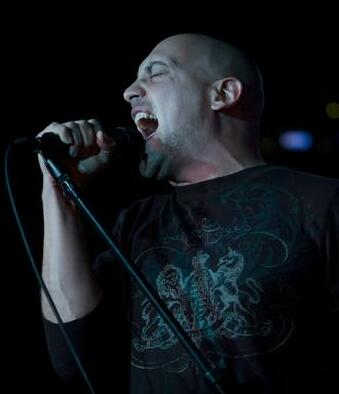

Background information
- Born: November 29, 1968 (age 57)
- Origin: Long Island, New York, U.S.
- Genres: Alternative rock, hard rock, grunge, alternative metal, post-grunge, heavy metal, R&B, blues, jazz, jam band
- Occupations: Singer, songwriter, musician
- Instruments: Vocals, keyboards
- Years active: 1994–present

Mike DiMeo (born November 29, 1968) is an American hard rock/heavy metal vocalist, best known for his work in the band Riot, which he left in late 2006. He recorded six studio albums and one live album with the group before departing to join Masterplan for the recording of MK II in 2006.

== Career ==
=== Deep Purple ===
DiMeo was known only in the New York club scene when asked by Ritchie Blackmore to join Deep Purple. In 1992, he recorded some demos with Roger Glover for what later became The Battle Rages On.... Against Blackmore's wishes, the rest of the band decided to reunite with Ian Gillan instead, and the recorded demos have never been released.

=== Riot ===
In the early 1990s, DiMeo was playing heavily in the tri-state area with original band Josie Sang, which also featured on guitar John Melendez (The Howard Stern Show, The Tonight Show). He gained a strong reputation as a singer and frontman, earning him an invitation to join Riot as the new lead singer in 1993. DiMeo did several Japanese and European tours with the band, including an appearance at the legendary Wacken festival in Germany in 1998. His final recording with the band was the 2006 release, Army of One.

=== The Lizards ===
DiMeo joined The Lizards in 2005 and recorded four studio albums with the band. They also released a live DVD featuring recordings of their live performances from around the world including a performance at the Sweden Rock Festival in 2005.

=== Masterplan ===
DiMeo joined German power metal band Masterplan in 2006, and he recorded Lost and Gone EP and MK II with the band, and toured Europe opening for British metal band Saxon. They also toured Japan and played some European festivals before DiMeo announced his departure from the band via his Myspace Mike Dimeo (mikedimeomusic) on Myspace page on January 11, 2009.

=== Tenpoint ===
On August 8, 2008, DiMeo announced a project with a New York City hard rock band called Tenpoint.

=== Midas Fate ===
DiMeo recorded the single "What Dreams May Come" with the band Midas Fate in late 2010. It was released in early 2011 in anticipation of a full-length album, scheduled for release in 2013. In May 2013, it was announced that the former Angra drummer, Aquiles Priester, had joined Midas Fate. The album Magnificent Rebel was planned for release in November 2013, but according to the band's Facebook page, there is as of yet no release date for the new album.

=== Johnny Winter ===
Mike DiMeo was the session keyboard player for Johnny Winter's 2011 album Roots. He contributed piano, electric piano, and Hammond organ on several tracks. The album also featured special guests Vince Gill, Warren Haynes, Derek Trucks, Sonny Landreth, and others. DiMeo performed live with the Johnny Winter band for the CD release party at B.B. King's in New York City.

Dimeo was the keyboard player on Johnny Winter's last studio album, Step Back. It features performances by a number of guest musicians, including Eric Clapton, Dr. John, Billy Gibbons from ZZ Top, Joe Perry from Aerosmith, and Brian Setzer from the Stray Cats. It was released by Megaforce Records on September 2, 2014. As on Winter's previous studio album, Roots the songs are mainly blues standards.

Step Back was released posthumously as Winter had finished recording the album and prior to the release, played a concert tour in Europe before he died on July 16, 2014. The album debuted at No. 1 on the Billboard charts for Blues Albums and Independent Albums, and at No. 17 on the Billboard 200. Step Back won the Grammy Award for Best Blues Album at the 2015 Annual Grammy Award.

=== Vinnie Moore ===
DiMeo was the keyboard player and vocalist for UFO guitarist Vinnie Moore during his 2010 European solo band tour. Other performances with Moore have since included New York City's legendary jazz club The Iridium, and the 2012 NAMM Show in Anaheim, CA and The Monsters of Rock Cruise in 2016. Dimeo played keyboards and sang on the track "Rise" which Moore and Dimeo co-wrote for Moore's 2022 album Double Exposure, released in November 2022.

=== Brand New ===
DiMeo played Hammond Organ on Science Fiction, the fifth studio album by American rock band Brand New. The album's title and track listing were officially revealed on August 17, 2017, after several weeks of speculation, hints and leaks with its physical release on October 20, 2017. It was both a critical and commercial success, being met with universal acclaim and becoming Brand New's first number one album on the Billboard 200 chart.

=== Phenomena ===
DiMeo was the vocalist on "The Sky Is Falling", a track on Tom Galley's 2010 Phenomena album "Blind Faith".

=== Tommy James and the Shondells ===
DiMeo has been the Hammond Organ player for retro rockers Tommy James and The Shondells, since 2007. James' hits include "Mony Mony", "Crimson and Clover" and "Draggin' the Line", and he has sold over 100 million records worldwide.

=== Bonnie Tyler ===
DiMeo has done several North American tours playing keyboards for Bonnie Tyler whose hits include "It's a Heartache" and "Total Eclipse of the Heart".

=== Jaimoe ===
Dimeo was the keyboard player for Jaimoe drummer and founding member of The Allman Brothers Band and his jazz-rock collective known as Jaimoe's Jasssz Band at the legendary venue My Father's Place on April 27, 2019.

=== Leslie West ===
Dimeo played keyboards on Legacy: A Tribute to Leslie West. The album originally scheduled to begin recording weeks before his death features a variety of guitarists. That group of musicians including Slash, Yngwie Malmsteen, Zakk Wylde, Charlie Starr Blackberry Smoke and many others, came together to record the album which was officially released on March 25, 2022, on Mascot Records.

=== Popa Chubby ===
In 2023 Dimeo played keyboards on Live At G. Bluey’s Juke Joint NYC (Gulf Coast, 2023, 2-CD set) And In 2025, Gulf Coast Records released Popa Chubby & Friends “I (Heart) Freddie King, an album of Freddie King covers featuring guests including Joe Bonamassa, Eric Gales, Mike Zito, Christone Kingfish Ingram and others.

=== Other artists ===
Australian power metal band Ilium released their album, Ageless Decay in June 2009 featuring DiMeo on vocals. In 2010, DiMeo appeared on debut album Tears of white roses of Czech melodic power metal band Sebastien, released on November 19 via Escape Music.

== Discography ==
- 1994 Nightbreaker – Riot
- 1996 The Brethren of the Long House – Riot
- 1998 Inishmore – Riot
- 1998 Shine On Live in Japan – Riot
- 1999 Sons of Society – Riot
- 2002 Through the Storm – Riot
- 2004 Cold Blooded Kings – The Lizards
- 2005 Against All Odds – The Lizards
- 2006 Army of One – Riot
- 2007 Lost And Gone EP – Masterplan
- 2007 MK II – Masterplan
- 2008 Archeology – The Lizards
- 2008 4-2-11 Live DVD – The Lizards
- 2009 Ageless Decay – Ilium
- 2010 A New Beginning – Creation's End
- 2011 What Dreams May Come (single) – Midas Fate
- 2011 Genetic Memory – Ilium
- 2011 Roots – Johnny Winter
- 2014 Step Back – Johnny Winter
- 2014 Metaphysical - Creation's End
- 2015 Reptilicus maximus – The Lizards
- 2017 Science Fiction – Brand New
- 2022 Legacy : A Tribute To Leslie West – Various artists
- 2022 Double Exposure – Vinnie Moore
- 2023 Live At G. Bluey’s Juke Joint NYC Popa Chubby
- 2025 I (Heart) Freddie King Popa Chubby
