= Born in America =

Studio album by Riot
- Released: October 14, 1983
- Recorded: Greene St. Recording, New York City
- Genre: Heavy metal
- Length: 39:27
- Label: Quality America (US), ZYX (Europe)
- Producer: Steve Loeb, Rod Hui

Riot chronology
Riot Live (EP) (1982)	Born in America (1983)	Thundersteel (1988)

Alternative cover

Professional ratings
Review scores
Source	Rating
AllMusic	2.5/5 stars
The Collector's Guide to Heavy Metal	9/10

Born in America is the fifth studio album released by the American heavy metal band Riot, released in 1983. After getting dropped by Elektra Records the band signed with Canadian indie label Quality Records for what was to be the second and last record with Rhett Forrester on vocals. This was also the last album for guitarist Rick Ventura, bassist Kip Leming, and drummer Sandy Slavin.

Germany's ZYX Music released the album in Europe, accompanied by a 12" single, "Warrior (live) b/w Born in America".

Born In America was re-issued in 1989 by Grand Slamm Records in the U.S. and CBS/Sony Records in Japan, both with different artwork. A further U.S. re-issue followed in 1999 through Metal Blade Records, utilizing the original cover artwork. Born In America was re-issued again in 2015.

== Track listing ==
Side one
No.	Title	Writer(s)	Length
1.	"Born in America"	Mark Reale, Steve Loeb, Rhett Forrester	4:07
2.	"You Burn in Me"	Reale	3:40
3.	"Wings of Fire"	Reale	4:39
4.	"Running from the Law"	Reale	4:24
5.	"Devil Woman" (Cliff Richard cover)	Terry Britten, Christine Holmes	4:01

Side two
No.	Title	Writer(s)	Length
6.	"Vigilante Killer"	Forrester	3:02
7.	"Heavy Metal Machine"	Reale	3:37
8.	"Where Soldiers Rule"	Rick Ventura	3:45
9.	"Gunfighter"	Reale	4:27
10.	"Promised Land"	Ventura	3:55

== Personnel ==
=== Riot ===
- Rhett Forrester – vocals
- Mark Reale – guitars
- Rick Ventura – guitars
- Kip Leming – bass
- Sandy Slavin – drums

=== Production ===
- Steve Loeb – producer
- Rod Hui – associate producer, engineer, mixing
- Howie Weinberg – mastering
