= S.A. Slayer =

American heavy metal band

- Also known as: Slayer
- Origin: San Antonio, Texas, U.S.
- Genres: Heavy metal, speed metal
- Years active: 1981–1984
- Labels: Rainforest Records; Under den Linden Records
- Past members: Steve Cooper; Don Van Stavern; Ron Jarzombek; Art Villarreal; Robert Catlin; Dave McClain; Chris Cronk

S.A. Slayer, originally known as Slayer, was an American heavy metal band formed in San Antonio, Texas, in 1981 by the former Blitzkrieg (not to be confused with the UK band Blitzkrieg) guitar duo Robert "Bob Dog" Catlin and Art Villarreal, bassist Don Van Stavern, drummer Dave McClain, and vocalist Chris Cronk (Fates Warning, Jag Panzer, Karion, Talisphere, Target 7). The latter was soon replaced by Steve Cooper and the band signed a record deal with local upstart label Rainforest Records and proceeded to record six songs for a proposed EP at B.O.S.S. Studios with producer/engineer duo Bob O'Neill and Rick Shrieves. The Prepare to Die EP was released in 1983 and "Slayer" became one of the top metal draws of the Texas scene. The band changed their name to S.A. Slayer following a cease and desist lawsuit from founder of Metal Blade Records, Brian Slagel, on behalf of thrash metal band Slayer. However band member Don Van Stavern denies that the band received a cease-and-desist letter, while Brian Slagel denies having sent a cease-and-desist letter.

== History ==
Guitarist Art Villarreal left the band in 1983 and joined forces with former Slayer band-mate, powerhouse vocalist Chris Cronk, bassist Pete Perez, and drummer Frank Ferraira to form one of the most influential power-progressive metal units to ever come out of the South Texas metal movement, Karion. His replacement was local guitar prodigy Ron Jarzombek who made his recording debut on Slayer's first and what would turn out to be only full-length album, Go For The Throat, again produced and engineered by the team of Bob O'Neill and Rick Shrieves. However, the album's release was put on hold indefinitely when Rainforest Records closed their doors. It would be another four years until obscure L.A.-based label Under den Linden Records bought the master tapes and issued the LP posthumously in 1988 under the altered moniker "S.A. Slayer" as to avoid confusion with the California-based speed–thrash metal outfit of the same name ("S.A." standing for "San Antonio"). Coincidentally, both bands had shared a bill at San Antonio's infamous rock venue "Villa Fontana" in what has been dubbed as the "Slayer vs. Slayer battle of the bands" when the latter were touring behind their Haunting the Chapel EP. The show was the penultimate San Antonio appearance of S.A. Slayer, on November 30, 1984. The show was conceived, produced and promoted by south Texas concert production company Omni Entertainment. A boutique organization created by two high school students committed to growing the burgeoning San Antonio underground heavy metal scene by booking national touring acts and giving local heavy hitters the opportunity to open.

=== Go for the Throat ===
After the album was released, the band encountered trouble with their label, Rainforest Records, who did not want to release an album that may result in legal action from the Los Angeles Slayer, backed by a much larger label at the time. Further, the band's distributor, Dutch East Indies was also dealing with its own legal problems stemming from the Dead Kennedys Frankenchrist album.

=== Disbanding ===
The band's final show was at another famous San Antonio rock music venue, "The Cameo" (also the venue that Metallica played one of its first Texas concerts in their first tour out of California, with S.A. Slayer as one of the opening bands) with Nasty Savage a few weeks after the Slayer vs Slayer show.

Three-fifths of the band's lineup – vocalist Steve Cooper, bassist Don Van Stavern, and Dave McClain – joined up with former Riot guitarist Mark Reale in the short-lived Narita. The three performers could not refuse the offer, as S.A. Slayer were at the time struggling for a solution, including changing the band's name, and all the band members had idolized Reale for a long time. Reale and Van Stavern eventually spun off Narita into a new version of Riot also featuring vocalist Tony Moore and drummer Bobby Jarzombek, formerly with San Antonio's Juggernaut.

Founder Bobdog Catlin would eventually go on to found (with Scott Womak and Harlan Glenn) Juggernaut, and has performed on shows and recordings with numerous bands since then, including Pigface, and San Antonio experimental music outfit Pseudo Buddha. A prominent figure in the San Antonio retail music business, he has most recently teamed up with original co-founder of S.A. Slayer, Art Villarreal, to form Martyrhead, a band focusing solely on covers of the 1970s and 1980s releases of Motörhead.

McClain would move to California where he joined a succession of bands, including Turbin, featuring former Anthrax vocalist Neil Turbin, Detente offshoot Catalepsy, Murdercar (featured on Metal Massacre X), the latter featuring guitarist Ross Robinson of future Korn, Slipknot, and Limp Bizkit production fame, and Ministers of Anger (featured on Metal Massacre XI), before moving on to Arizona thrashers Sacred Reich, and eventually Bay Area heavies Machine Head.

Guitarist Ron Jarzombek went on to record with his brother/drummer Bobby Jarzombek under the name Happy Kitties, before joining Austin, Texas progressive thrash metal trailblazers Watchtower in late 1986, following the departure of original guitarist Billy White. In 1993, Jarzombek joined forces with his brother Bobby and former Karion and now Riot bassist Pete Perez to form prog-tech metal trio Spastic Ink, and has since gone on to guest on various albums by artists such as former Megadeth guitarist Marty Friedman, members of Cynic offshoot Gordian Knot, Jeff Loomis, and Obscura. In 2005 Jarzombek formed the all-instrumental technical extreme metal outfit Blotted Science along with bassist Alex Webster of Cannibal Corpse fame and is once again busy with Watchtower.

Vocalist Steve Cooper was recruited by San Antonio locals Juggernaut for the recording of their sophomore effort Trouble Within in 1987 before doing a brief stint with fellow Metal Blade Records recording artists Exxplorer. Cooper would succumb to kidney failure due to complications of type 1 diabetes on May 14, 2006.

Both Slayer releases have been bootlegged extensively in places like Germany, Greece, the Netherlands and Brazil. A semi-official CD re-issue of Prepare To Die, limited to 1000 numbered copies, appeared sometime in 2004. A limited number of a sound mixer recording of the final S.A. Slayer show, "Slayer Vs. Slayer" occasionally auctions on eBay.

== Musical influences ==
According to the December 2009 interview in the San Antonio Backbeat magazine, Art Villarreal and Bobdog Catlin claim the band's biggest influences at the time were Judas Priest and Iron Maiden. They were also influenced by rock music that was on the radio at that time, including Budgie, Rush, Black Sabbath, Oz Knozz, Pavlov's Dog, and Head East among others. The band also toured Texas as an opening act for the then upcoming band Metallica's first Texas tour in support of the Kill 'em All album, in 1983.

== Members ==
=== Former ===
- Steve Cooper – vocals (1983–1984)
- Chris Cronk – vocals (1982)
- Robert "Bob Dog" Catlin – guitars (1982–1984)
- Ron Jarzombek – guitars (1984)
- Art Villarreal – guitars (1982–1983)
- Don Van Stavern – bass (1982–1984)
- Dave McClain – drums (1982–1984)

== Discography ==
- Prepare to Die EP – 1983 (Rainforest)
- Go for the Throat LP – 1988 (Under den Linden)

== See also ==
- Slayer, the other band by the same name
