= Sons of Society =

Studio album by Riot
- Released: September 7, 1999
- Recorded: Millbrook Sound Studios, Millbrook, New York
- Genre: Heavy metal, hard rock
- Length: 54:00
- Label: Toshiba EMI Japan; Metal Blade
- Producer: Mark Reale, Paul Orofino

Riot chronology
Shine On (1998)	Sons of Society (1999)	Through the Storm (2002)

Professional ratings
Review scores
Source	Rating
AllMusic	3/5 stars
Collector's Guide to Heavy Metal	8/10

Sons of Society is the eleventh studio album by American heavy metal band Riot, released in Japan on July 15, 1999, and in the US on September 7, 1999, with a missing track.

== Track listing ==
All tracks are written by Mike DiMeo, Mark Reale, except where noted.

No.	Title	Writer(s)	Length
1.	"Snake Charmer"	Frank Carillo	1:04
2.	"On the Wings of Life"	Mike DiMeo, Mark Reale	4:36
3.	"Sons of Society"	DiMeo, Reale	4:26
4.	"Twist of Fate"	DiMeo, Reale, Mike Flyntz	5:36
5.	"Bad Machine"	DiMeo, Reale	5:06
6.	"Cover Me"	DiMeo, Reale	6:47
7.	"Dragonfire"	DiMeo, Reale, Flyntz	3:38
8.	"The Law"	DiMeo, Flyntz	3:46
9.	"Time to Bleed"	DiMeo, Reale, Pete Perez, Bobby Jarzombek	4:38
10.	"Queen"	DiMeo, Reale	4:28
11.	"Somewhere"	DiMeo, Perez	4:16
12.	"Promises"	DiMeo, Flyntz	4:35

- "Queen" is a standard track on the original Japan release but is omitted on the US and other countries' releases.

== Personnel ==
=== Band members ===
- Mike DiMeo – lead vocals, Hammond organ, keyboards
- Mark Reale – electric and acoustic guitars, keyboards, percussion, strings arrangements, producer
- Mike Flyntz – electric guitars
- Pete Perez – bass
- Bobby Jarzombek – drums

=== Additional musicians ===
- Frank Carrillo – sitar, tamboura
- Tony Harnell, Burt Carey – backing vocals

=== Production ===
- Paul Orofino – producer, engineer, mixing
- Chris Cubeta – engineer
- George Marino – mastering
- Jeff Allen, Jack Bart – executive producers
