= Rock City (Riot album) =

Studio album by Riot
- Released: September 1977
- Recorded: November 1976 – June 1977
- Studio: Big Apple Recording Studio, New York City
- Genre: Heavy metal; hard rock
- Length: 33:15
- Label: Fire Sign Records
- Producer: Steve Loeb, Billy Arnell, Richard Alexander

Riot chronology
Rock City (1977)	Narita (1979)

Professional ratings
Review scores
Source	Rating
AllMusic	4/5 stars
Record Mirror	4/5 stars

Rock City is the debut studio album by American heavy metal band Riot; it was released in 1977.

The album was first released independently by Fire Sign Records, run by the band's producers, Billy Arnell and Steve Loeb, who also owned the Greene Street Recording Studio, before the album was picked up for wider distribution by Canada's Attic Records and by Victor Entertainment in Japan. Vinyl copies of Rock City can be differentiated by the color that frames the front cover artwork. The original Fire Sign pressing is framed in white; later editions are framed in black or lack this feature altogether.

American label Metal Blade Records re-issued the album on CD in early 1993 and again in 2015.

Rock City is the only Riot album to feature writing and recording contributions by original bassist Phil Feit who went on to join acts such as Billy Idol, playing on his hits Hot in the City and White Wedding, Joan Jett & The Blackhearts, and Adam Bomb, where he briefly crossed paths with another Riot member, drummer Sandy Slavin.

== Track listing ==
Side one
No.	Title	Writer(s)	Length
1.	"Desperation"	Phil Feit, Mark Reale, Guy Speranza	2:43
2.	"Warrior"	Steve Costello, Reale, Speranza	3:50
3.	"Rock City"	Feit, Reale, Speranza	3:29
4.	"Overdrive"	Reale, Speranza, Lou A. Kouvaris	4:12

Side two
No.	Title	Writer(s)	Length
5.	"Angel"	Feit, Reale, Speranza	3:37
6.	"Tokyo Rose"	Reale, Speranza, Kouvaris	4:20
7.	"Heart of Fire"	Reale, Speranza, Kouvaris	3:00
8.	"Gypsy Queen"	Reale, Speranza, Kouvaris	3:56
9.	"This Is What I Get"	Reale, Speranza	4:09

== Personnel ==
- Guy Speranza – vocals
- Mark Reale – guitars
- Lou A. Kouvaris – guitars
- Jimmy Iommi – bass (2, 4, 6–9)
- Peter Bitelli – drums
- Phil Feit – bass (1, 3, 5)

== Derivative work ==
- Austrian artist Matthias Laurenz Gräff used the album cover of Rock City in his political painting.
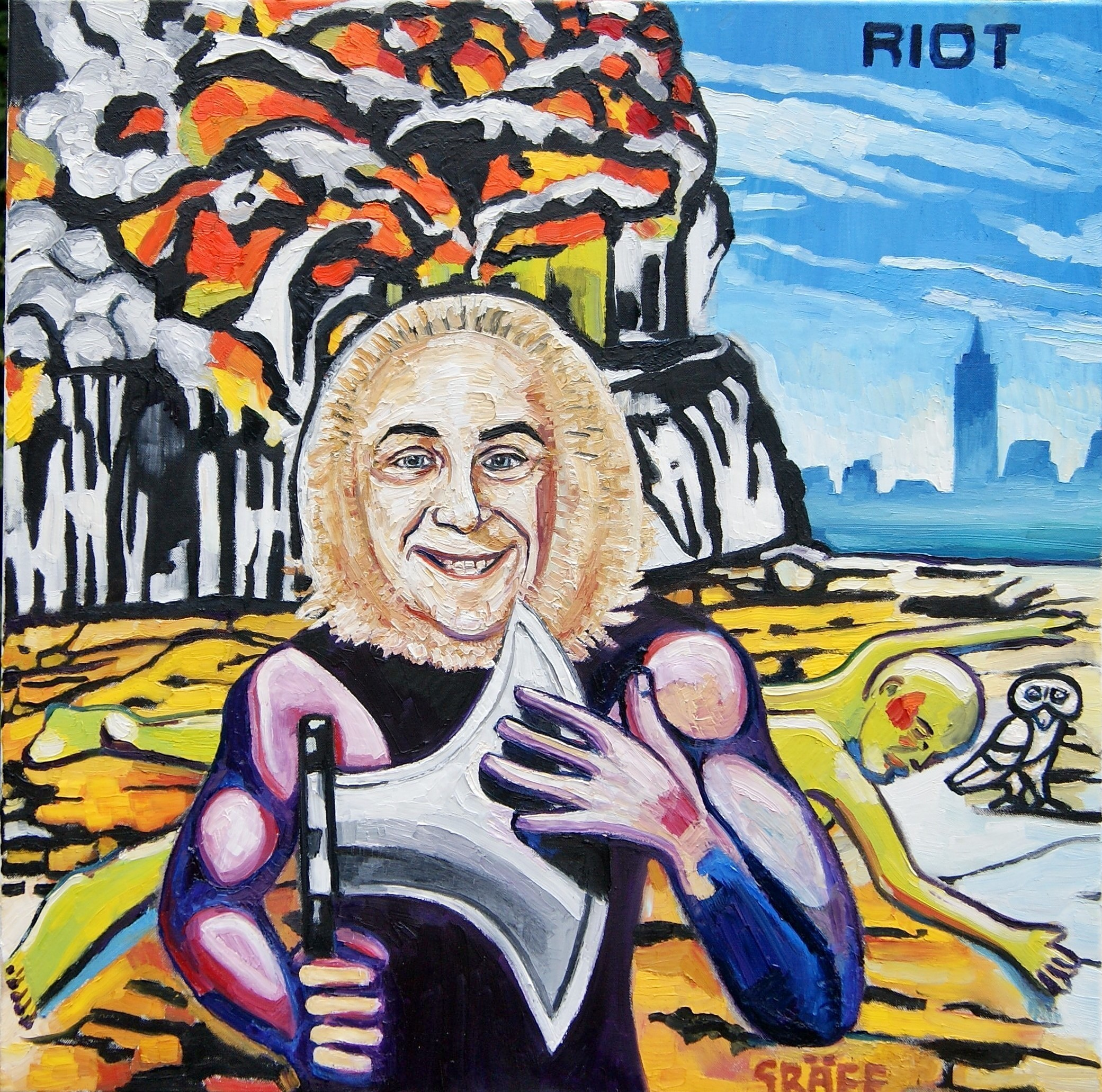
Riot, Rock City as "Riot, Rock City (allegory to H. C. Strache and the music album of the same name"), 2016
