= Tony Moore (singer) =

American singer

Tony Moore is a singer. He was the lead singer of the heavy metal band Riot from 1986 to 1992, recording Thundersteel, The Privilege of Power, 2008 to 2009 and rejoining in 2010 along with the other members from the Thundersteel line-up to release Immortal Soul. He also sang with Faith and Fire, a project with Mike Flyntz. They released their first and only album Accelerator in 2006.
