= Fire Down Under =

Studio album by Riot
- Released: 9 February 1981
- Recorded: 1980
- Studios: Greene St. Recording, New York City
- Genre: Heavy metal
- Length: 37:35
- Labels: Elektra, Victor (Japan)
- Producers: Steve Loeb and Billy Arnell

Riot chronology
Narita (1979)	Fire Down Under (1981)	Restless Breed (1982)

Professional ratings
Review scores
Source	Rating
AllMusic	4.5/5 stars
Martin Popoff	10/10

Fire Down Under is the third studio album by American heavy metal band Riot, released in 1981, it is the last album to feature original vocalist Guy Speranza. The song "Flashbacks" is dedicated to Neal Kay, a British DJ who supported heavy metal in the UK during the new wave of British heavy metal.

The album was re-issued on CD in 1997 by the German-based High Vaultage label, utilizing a new, controversial remix by former Riot producer Steve Loeb, and in 1999 by Metal Blade Records in the U.S., this time featuring the original Elektra mix. The album was reissued in 2014 courtesy of Varèse Sarabande. All three versions contain various bonus tracks recorded for the original Capitol Records version of Fire Down Under which the band were unhappy with. Capitol dropped the band for being "too heavy" after hearing the final version subsequently released by Elektra Records. In 2018 the album was reissued, remastered and with six bonus tracks, by Rock Candy Records.

== Track listing ==
Side one
No.	Title	Composers	Length
1.	"Swords and Tequila"	Guy Speranza, Mark Reale	3:18
2.	"Fire Down Under"	Speranza, Kip Leming	2:31
3.	"Feel the Same"	Rick Ventura	4:52
4.	"Outlaw"	Speranza, Reale	4:19
5.	"Don't Bring Me Down"	Speranza, Reale, Leming, Ventura, Sandy Slavin	3:00

Side two
No.	Title	Composers	Length
6.	"Don't Hold Back"	Speranza, Reale	3:14
7.	"Altar of the King"	Speranza, Reale	4:44
8.	"No Lies"	Ventura	4:19
9.	"Run for Your Life"	Speranza, Reale	3:16
10.	"Flashbacks"	Speranza, Reale, Leming, Ventura, Slavin	4:00

1997 remastered edition bonus tracks
No.	Title	Composers	Length
11.	"Struck By Lightning"	Reale, Speranza	3:41
12.	"Misty Morning Rain"	Speranza	3:10
13.	"You're All I Needed Tonight"	Speranza, Ventura	3:00
14.	"One Step Closer"	Ventura	2:14
15.	"Hot Life"	Ventura	0:25

1999, 2014 & 2016 remastered editions bonus tracks
No.	Title	Composers	Length
11.	"Misty Morning Rain"	Speranza	3:10
12.	"You're All I Needed Tonight"	Speranza, Ventura	3:00

2018 Rock Candy Records remastered edition bonus tracks
No.	Title	Composers	Length
11.	"Misty Morning Rain"	Speranza	3:10
12.	"You're All I Needed Tonight"	Speranza, Ventura	3:00
13.	"One Step Closer"	Ventura	2:14
14.	"Struck By Lightning"	Reale, Speranza	3:41
15.	"Outlaw (Remix/Edited)"	Reale, Speranza	3:18
16.	"Rock City (Live)"	Feit, Reale, Speranza	4:29

== Personnel ==
=== Band members ===
- Guy Speranza – vocals
- Mark Reale – guitar
- Rick Ventura – guitar
- Kip Leming – bass
- Sandy Slavin – drums

=== Production ===
- Steve Loeb, Billy Arnell – producers
- Rod Hui – engineer, mixing
- Howie Weinberg – mastering

== Cover versions and appearances ==
- The song "Swords and Tequila" is featured in the video game Brütal Legend.
- The song "Swords and Tequila" was covered by the band "Salvación".

== Chart performance ==
Year	Chart	Position
1981	Billboard 200	49
