= Rhett Forrester =

American singer (1956–1994)

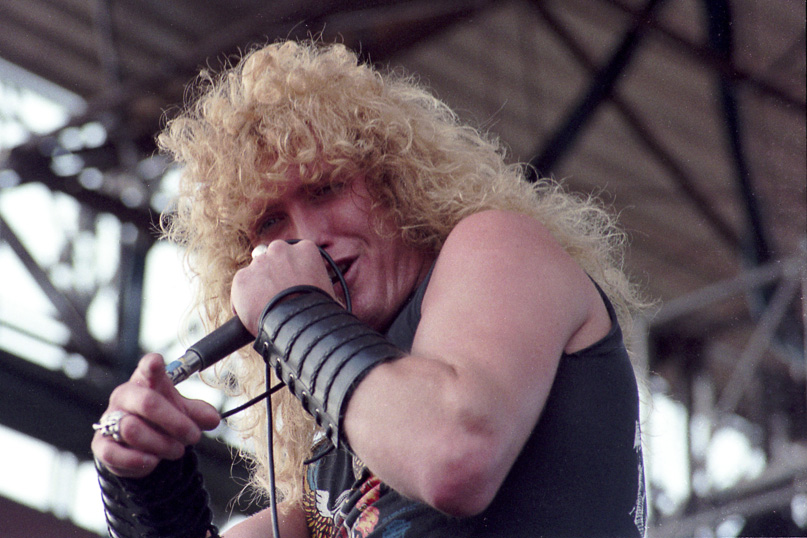
- Forrester in concert, August 1984

Background information
- Born: September 22, 1956; Tucker, Georgia, U.S.
- Died: January 22, 1994 (aged 37) Atlanta, Georgia, U.S.
- Genres: Heavy metal, hard rock
- Occupation: Singer
- Years active: 1981–1994
- Formerly of: Riot, Jack Starr, Alex Masi Dogbone, The Black Symphony, Dr. Dirty, Dirty Water, Rachel, Hitman

Rhett Forrester (September 22, 1956 – January 22, 1994) was an American musician best known as the lead singer for New York-based band Riot from 1981 until 1984.

== Biography ==
Forrester was born on September 22, 1956, in Tucker, Georgia. His mother was a ballroom dance instructor. He started to develop his trademark voice in high school, at The Sanford Naval Academy, when he began taking vocal lessons. After graduation, he moved to South Carolina where he began playing in local bands. In the late 1970s, Forrester joined forces with two former members of Illinois act Roller, guitarist Russ Shirley and bassist/vocalist Kevin Lee, and drummer Jim Schroeder, to form Hitman. The band stayed together for about a year, playing around the Georgia State area. Forrester's big break came while he was with a New York cover band named Rachel, when he successfully auditioned to replace the departing Guy Speranza in Riot.

He would make his studio debut on 1982's Restless Breed album which the band supported by touring with headliners Rainbow on their Straight Between the Eyes tour, sharing the bill at different times with Saxon, Scorpions, and UFO. Keeping up their momentum, the Riot Live EP was released later that same year. After losing their major label deal with Elektra, Riot signed with Canadian indie label Quality Records for the 1983 release of Born in America, Forrester's second and last studio album with the band. In early 1984, Riot played dates on Kiss's Lick It Up tour alongside Vandenberg, but decided to split up shortly thereafter.

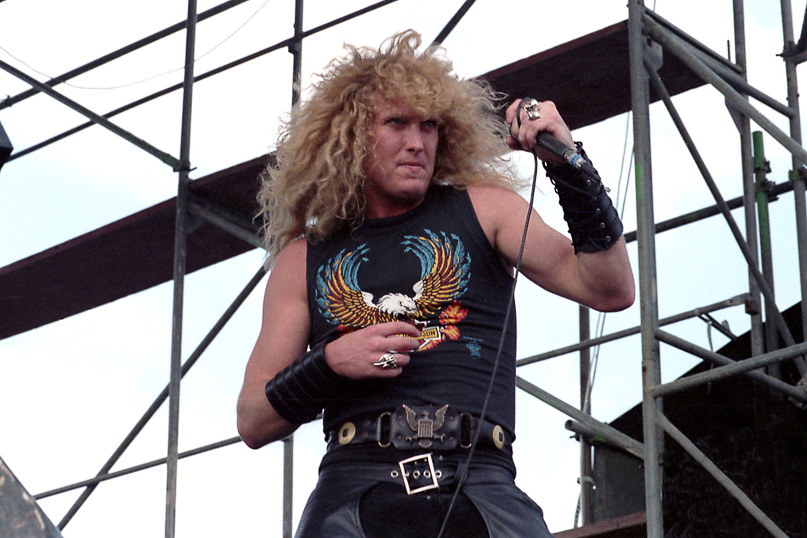
Forrester at the Breaking Sound Festival (France), August 1984

After the demise of Riot, Forrester teamed with former Virgin Steele guitarist Jack Starr and appeared on his 1984 solo album, Out of the Darkness, which featured The Rods rhythm section of Carl Canedy and Gary Bordonaro. This was also the line-up that traveled to France in the summer of 1984 for an appearance at the two-day Breaking Sound Festival in Le Bourget, near Paris, on August 30. Erroneously billed as Virgin Steele in advance of the festival, they played just below headliners Dio and Blue Öyster Cult.

Forrester would part ways with Starr after the ill-fated gig and ended up stranded in France for a period of time. He wound up utilizing the months of September and October to record his first solo album, Gone with the Wind, including a cover of The Rolling Stones' "Live with Me", at Studio Max Waldberg in Paris. Released by French indie label Bernett Records, it featured New York guitarist/co-writer Paul Kayen, aka Paul Kane, who had guested on Starr's Out of the Darkness, and was also a member of Aldo Nova's group at the time appearing on his 1985 Twitch album. Gone with the Wind would see a belated American release in 1986 via Shattered Records.

In 1985, Forrester took part in the Combat Records initiated Thrasher project, featuring an all-star cast of mostly New York based musicians, including members of The Rods, Talas, Bible Black, and Dust, contributing vocals to the song "Bad Boys" on the Burning At the Speed of Light album.

Forrester briefly joined an aborted West Coast version of Riot, consisting of guitarist Mark Reale, bassist Van Stavern, and drummer Sandy Slavin, performing live with the band at The Roxy in West Hollywood, California, on April 16 & 18, 1986. Bootleg recordings of both gigs are available for download on numerous sites online.

Still with Paul Kayen as his guitarist/co-writer, Forrester signed a new record deal with Rhino Records subsidiary Rampage and released Even the Score in 1988. The album was recorded at Backdoor Studios in Huntington Station, New York, produced by Chris Pati and engineered by John Tabacco. It was subsequently remixed in Los Angeles. It contained a re-make of "Assume the Position", accompanied by an explicit video, as well as a cover of Mott the Hoople and Bad Company's "Ready for Love".

After splitting with Kayen, Forrester briefly worked with guitarist Alex Masi and in 1991 recorded demos with former Keel members, guitarist Bryan Jay and drummer Dwain Miller, and bassist Rob Thiessen under the name Dogbone. These recordings were released on CD after Forrester's death in 1996. Dogbone's song "Dog Fight Alley", re-titled "Streets of Rock & Roll", was released by Keel as the title track to their 2010 comeback album, Streets of Rock & Roll, albeit without any credit given to Forrester or Dogbone.

In the early 1990s, Forrester became the frontman for Calgary, Alberta-based band The Black Symphony, featuring guitarist Rick Plester, bassist RJ Killinger, and drummer Tim Waterson. They recorded a three-song demo in 1992 containing the songs "The End of Time", "Redemption", and "In the Beginning". Forrester also got involved with another Calgary act, Dr. Dirty, a union which produced a pair of four-song demos. The group dissolved on the verge of signing a major label record deal. Forrester's last project prior to his death was Dirty Water with San Antonio, Texas guitarist/co-writer Jonathan Grell, formerly of Winterkat. He was killed shortly after completing a 4-song demo.

Rare material, including five songs from the Mr. Dirty project, featuring Forrester, ex-Steel Lily guitarist Rob Robbins (now found in Moxy), bassist/songwriter Scot Gains, and drummer Ray Mehlbaum, was released in 1996 on the Hell or Highwater memorial CD. The album also contains three songs from the Dirty Water sessions, recorded with Grell, drummer Dwain Miller (Keel, Outlaw Blood, Dogbone), and bassist Robert Cooper. Hell or Highwater received an official digital release in November 2014.

In November 2013, an expanded 30-year anniversary edition of Jack Starr and Rhett Forrester's Out of the Darkness, including rare pictures and liner notes, was issued by Germany's Limb Music label.

== Death ==
Forrester was shot and killed at the Northwest Atlanta intersection of Lovejoy Street (now Centennial Lane) and Merritts Avenue, one block west of Techwood Drive (now Centennial Olympic Park Drive), after he refused to give up his vehicle in an attempted carjacking; he was 37 years old. He was survived by his mother Lafortune Forrester, his brother, guitarist Lucky Forrester, his ex, Windi Grace, daughter, Jade Grace, and his fiancé, Lori Plester, whom he was living with at the time.

== Posthumous honor ==
Forrester was inducted into Atlanta's Hard Rock Cafe in 1996. The ceremony was held on June 22, two weeks before the 1996 Summer Olympics.

== Discography ==
=== Solo ===
- 1984 – Gone with the Wind
- 1988 – Even the Score
- 1996 – Hell or Highwater

=== With Riot ===
- 1982 – Restless Breed
- 1982 – Riot Live (EP)
- 1983 – Born in America

=== With Jack Starr ===
- 1984 – Out of the Darkness

=== With Dogbone ===
- 1996 – Dogbone

=== Videos ===
- 1982 – Riot – Restless Breed
- 1984 – Riot – Born In America
- 1988 – Rhett Forrester – Assume the Position

=== Demos ===
- 1992 – The Black Symphony – 3-song demo
- 1993 – Power Plant Sessions – 4-song demo (Jan.)
- 1993 – Clear Lake Sessions – 4-song demo (Apr.)
- 1993 – Dirty Water Sessions – 4-song demo
