= The Privilege of Power =

Studio album by Riot
- Released: 28 February 1990
- Recorded: December 1988 – September 1989
- Studio: Greene St. Recording, New York City
- Genre: Heavy metal, progressive metal
- Length: 57:52
- Label: Epic
- Producer: Steve Loeb, Vince Perazzo, Rod Hui, Mark Reale

Riot chronology
Riot Live (1989)	The Privilege of Power (1990)	Riot in Japan – Live!! (1992)

The Privilege of Power is the seventh studio album by American heavy metal band Riot. It was more experimental than their previous work, being an attempt at a concept album and also including a horn section on some of the tracks.

"Racing with the Devil on a Spanish Highway" is a cover of an Al Di Meola instrumental track from the album Elegant Gypsy (1977). "Killer" is about convicted killer Jeffrey R. MacDonald and features a guest vocal appearance by Joe Lynn Turner (ex-Rainbow, Yngwie Malmsteen).

The album was re-issued in 2003 by Collectables Records with slightly amended artwork and re-issued on 180g vinyl as a 2-LP set with Thundersteel by SPV on February 25, 2013.

== Critical reception ==
Professional ratings
Review scores
Source	Rating
AllMusic	4/5 stars
Classic Rock	8/10 stars
Collector's Guide to Heavy Metal	8/10
Rock Hard	9.5/10

In 2005, The Privilege of Power was ranked number 354 in Rock Hard magazine's book of The 500 Greatest Rock & Metal Albums of All Time.

== Track listing ==
No.	Title	Writer(s)	Length
1.	"On Your Knees"	Tony Moore, Don Van Stavern	6:37
2.	"Metal Soldiers"	Moore, Mark Reale, Van Stavern	6:40
3.	"Runaway"	Moore, Reale	5:11
4.	"Killer"	Moore, Reale, Van Stavern	4:53
5.	"Dance of Death"	Moore, Van Stavern, Reale	7:17
6.	"Storming the Gates of Hell"	Reale	3:43
7.	"Maryanne"	Moore, Reale	4:55
8.	"Little Miss Death"	Eric Mauk, Moore, Reale	4:12
9.	"Black Leather and Glittering Steel"	Moore, Van Stavern	7:07
10.	"Racing with the Devil on a Spanish Highway (Revisited)" (Al Di Meola cover)	Al Di Meola	7:17

== Personnel ==
=== Band members ===
- Tony Moore – vocals
- Mark Reale – guitars, producer
- Don Van Stavern – bass
- Bobby Jarzombek – drums

=== Additional musicians ===
- Tower of Power horn section: Greg Adams, Emilio Castillio, Steve Kupka, Lee Thornburg, Steve Gross
- Randy Brecker, Jon Faddis, Dave Bargeron, Ron Cuber, Lawrence Feldman – horn section
- James 'Blood' Ulmer – guitar
- G. E. Smith – guitar
- T. M. Stevens – bass
- Joe Lynn Turner – vocals on "Killer"
- Bob Held – bass on "Little Miss Death"

=== Production ===
- Steve Loeb – producer, executive producer
- Vince Perazzo – executive producer
- Rod Hui – producer, engineer, mixing
- Nick Sansano, Chris Shaw, Kirk Yano – engineers
- Dan Wood, Dave Swanson, Jason Vogel, Kenny Almestica, Glenn Zimet – assistant engineers
