= Guy Speranza =

- Born: March 12, 1956
- Died: November 8, 2003 (aged 47) Orlando, Florida, U.S.
- Genres: Heavy metal, hard rock
- Occupation: Musician
- Instrument: Vocals
- Years active: 1975–1981
- Formerly of: Riot

Guy Speranza (March 12, 1956 – November 8, 2003) was an American singer best known as New York City-based metal band Riot's original frontman from 1975 to 1981.

== Career ==
Speranza sang on the first three albums of Riot, 1977's Rock City, 1979's Narita and 1981's Fire Down Under and played at the first Monsters of Rock festival in 1980, before leaving the band in 1981.

In 1982, Scott Ian called Speranza to offer him the position as the lead singer for Anthrax. Speranza declined the offer, saying he was done with the music business.

But in 1994 Guy came close to choosing to come back to singing. He got together with Mark and Mike Dimeo at Green Street Recording studios to work on some song ideas. Someone hit record on a DAT tape to be able to record whatever ideas came out. That tape ended up in Mark’s archives and was much later retrieved and digitized by Riot archivist Giles Lavery. It’s been out there in the Archives # 5 set, but since it was a data track found on the bonus CD, not many have heard it.

After retiring from music, Speranza worked as an exterminator in Florida until being diagnosed with pancreatic cancer, from which he died on November 8, 2003.
