= Riot V =

American heavy metal band

Riot
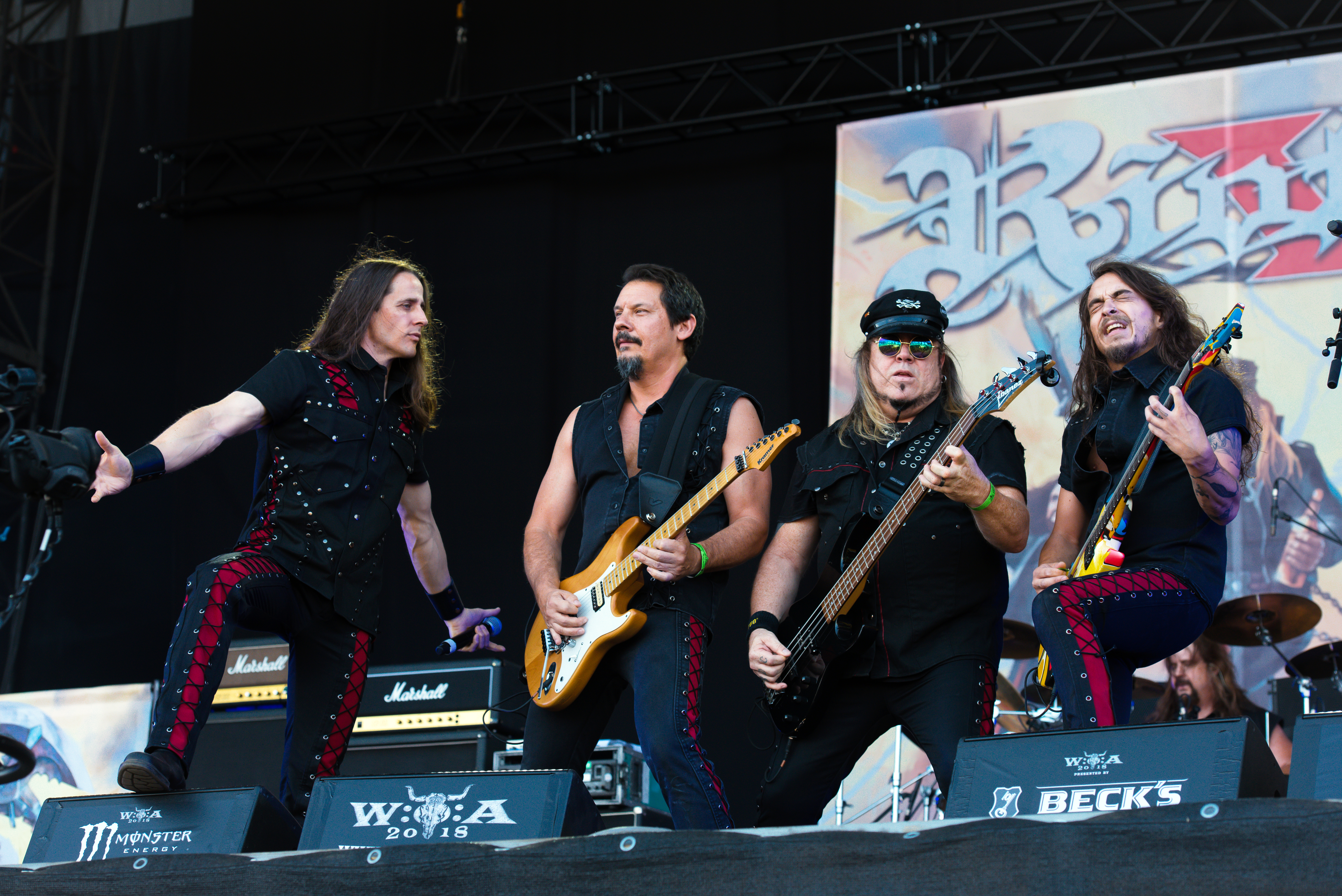
- Riot V performing at Wacken Open Air on August 4, 2018.

Background information
- Also known as: Riot V(2012 - 2026)
- Origin: New York City, U.S.
- Genres: Heavy metal; power metal; speed metal; hard rock
- Works: Riot discography
- Years active: 1975–1984, 1986–2012, 2013–present (as Riot V)
- Labels: Nuclear Blast, Ward, Fire Sign, Capitol, Elektra, Quality, CBS, Sony, Zero, Toshiba-EMI, Metal Blade, Rising Sun, Metal Heaven
- Members: Don Van Stavern; Mike Flyntz; Todd Michael Hall; Nick Lee; Frank Gilchriest
- Past members: See: List of Riot V band members

Riot V, formerly known as Riot, is an American heavy metal band formed in New York City in 1975 by guitarist Mark Reale. Achieving peak success and popularity during the early 1980s, the band has continued a long-running successful career. Riot started out as straightforward heavy metal, but since their 1988 release Thundersteel, their style has shifted towards power metal.

In 2013, surviving members of Riot reformed the band as Riot V, after the death of founder, guitarist, primary songwriter and leader Mark Reale. The group uses a baby seal face as a logo on its album covers.

== History ==
=== Early years (1975–1983) ===
Riot was formed in 1975 in New York City, when Kon-Tiki guitarist Mark Reale and drummer Peter Bitelli recruited bassist Phil Feit and vocalist Guy Speranza. The line up recorded a four-track demo, which they hoped would be included in a proposed compilation of new rock bands. While waiting for the project to get off the ground, they added Steve Costello on keyboards.

Reale took the various demos to New York-based producers Billy Arnell and Steve Loeb, who also owned Greene Street Recording Studio and the associated label Fire-Sign Records. Arnell and Loeb turned down the compilation proposal but signed Riot. The band added second guitarist Louie Kouvaris and replaced Feit with Jimmy Iommi, though both bass players participated in the recording of its debut album, Rock City; the record was recorded and produced by Arnell and Loeb and released on their Fire Sign Records. After a promising start and support slots with AC/DC and Molly Hatchet, the band were unable to maintain momentum and were on the verge of breaking up by 1979.

In that year, however, the new wave of British heavy metal broke mainstream, and the band came to the attention of influential DJ Neal Kay who spread the word about them in Britain where fans bought imported copies of Rock City. Encouraged, Arnell and Loeb, now Riot's managers, recorded the band's new album Narita. In the course of the recording, Kouvaris was replaced by roadie Rick Ventura .

Subsequent to a successful support of Sammy Hagar on his US Texas tour, Capitol Records offered Riot a worldwide deal for Narita, mostly to support Hagar. Capitol and Hagar needed a harder, younger edge to associate with him, so Riot was chosen if they agreed to open for Hagar on his UK tour. Hagar and Riot had a successful tour, but Riot was dropped by Capitol as soon as they were finished with the tour.

Arnell and Loeb spent the remaining Capitol Records advance while retaining important indie FM radio promotions to promote the last Riot album. Arnell and Loeb put the album on as many radio stations around the country as possible, thus raising the radio profile enough to where Capitol picked up their option for another record, which led to Riot's biggest selling album, Fire Down Under.

When the record was completed some months later, Capitol turned the record down calling it "commercially unacceptable", which put the band in contractual limbo. Capitol refused to release the band from the contract. A campaign was organized and financed by producers Arnell and Loeb, and engaging fans around the world. Fans picketed the offices of EMI Records, especially in the UK. Finally, Elektra Records reached an agreement with Capitol Vice President Rupert Perry and immediately released Fire Down Under, which then soared into the Billboard 200 chart.

=== Breakup, the "Reunion" and Reale's death (1983–2012) ===
Singer Guy Speranza (March 12, 1956 – November 8, 2003) had difficulty melding his religious convictions with his role in the band and was replaced by Rhett Forrester (September 22, 1956 – January 22, 1994) for the next album, Restless Breed (1982). Though a striking frontman, any hope of a major breakthrough was sunk by a combination of Forrester's erratic behaviour on the road, a changing of the guard at Elektra, and the 1983 success of Quiet Riot's cover of "Cum on Feel the Noize". The next album, Born in America, (1983) was self-financed by Steve Loeb and was released on Quality Records, an independent Canadian label. A note on the reverse of the album tried to explain away would-be fans' confusion between Riot and the now No. 1-selling Quiet Riot, but support melted away, leading to the band's disintegration.

Reale relocated to San Antonio, Texas, where he recruited former S.A. Slayer members Steve Cooper, Don Van Stavern, and Dave McClain (now with Sacred Reich) for a short-lived new band called Narita. By 1986, Reale and Van Stavern had made their way out to Los Angeles in an attempt to resurrect Riot along with former members Sandy Slavin and Rhett Forrester. Harry 'The Tyrant' Conklin (Jag Panzer) handled vocals for a short time but was dismissed after losing his voice on the second night of back-to-back gigs due to excessive drinking. Eventually, Reale reunited with producer Steve Loeb and moved back to New York. Drummer Mark Edwards (Steeler, Third Stage Alert) was recruited to complete the new rhythm section with bassist Don Van Stavern, while Greene Street Studio manager Dave Harrington brought in Tony Moore (real name: Tony Morabito) on vocals. Loeb cut a four-track demo at his Greene Street Studio in Soho, New York and along with real estate maven turned rock manager Vince Perazzo, brought the band to CBS Associated, who offered the band a worldwide deal. Edwards elected to leave the band as his own Los Angeles-based group Lion was getting signed to Scotti Brothers. He was superseded by San Antonio, Texas native Bobby Jarzombek, formerly with Juggernaut, who cut the rest of the drum tracks for what became the Thundersteel album, released in 1988. It was followed by the more experimental The Privilege of Power (1990), which saw the band augment their state-of-the-art heavy metal sound with horns, courtesy of the Brecker Brothers and Tower of Power. The album also featured a guest vocal appearance by Joe Lynn Turner of Rainbow fame. Second guitarist Mike Flyntz joined the ranks for the band's 1989 Thundersteel tour of Japan where Riot maintained their strongest subsequent following. Along with hiring tour manager Joey Batts who toured with them through the U.S and Japan. Bassist Don Van Stavern quit the band after the US leg of the Privilege of Power tour and was replaced by fellow Texan Pete Perez (ex-Karion).

In 1992, vocalist Tony Moore left the group over disagreements with manager/producer Steve Loeb. Reale recruited newcomer Mike DiMeo, who had played with Howard Stern sidekick Stuttering John Melendez in a local band named Josie Sang, with a view toward making a more hard rock-oriented solo album. Eventually, those plans were dropped and the proposed solo effort turned into another Riot album, 1993's Nightbreaker, which featured a remake of the Fire Down Under track "Outlaw", as well as covers of Deep Purple's "Burn" and "A Whiter Shade of Pale" by Procol Harum. The following LP, the Native American-themed Brethren of the Long House (1996), which saw John Macaluso (TNT, Powermad) briefly take over for Bobby Jarzombek on drums, marked the final collaboration with long-time associate Steve Loeb who stepped down from the production chair in 1995. All told, Loeb produced or co-produced 13 Riot albums in his 19-year association with Reale and the different configurations of Riot. For the rest of the decade Riot maintained a stable line-up for the first time in its history, resulting in a steady output of high-quality albums, i.e. Inishmore (1998), Shine On live (1998), and Sons of Society (1999). Jarzombek left again in late 1999, this time to join former Judas Priest vocalist Rob Halford in his new venture Halford. Pat Magrath (Prototype, Killing Culture) filled in for Jarzombek on the following European tour before being replaced by veteran skinsman Bobby Rondinelli (Rainbow, Black Sabbath, Blue Öyster Cult) with whom the band recorded Through the Storm (2002).

In 2006, Riot returned with another album, Army of One, featuring new addition Frank Gilchriest (Virgin Steele, Gothic Knights) on drums. It marked the final album with vocalist Mike DiMeo who had earlier announced his departure in order to concentrate on his work with retro rockers The Lizards after a 12-year run with Riot. DiMeo was succeeded by the New York area singer Mike Tirelli, whose Riot live debut came in early 2005 at the band's Atarfe Vega Rock Festival appearance in Granada, Spain.

Riot with Tirelli toured the United States for most of 2005 and made an appearance in Japan in both 2006 and 2007 and undertook a tour of Spain in 2007.

In 2008, it was announced that the classic Thundersteel-era line-up would reunite for a tour, starting in June 2009 with high-profile shows at the Sweden Rock and Metalway festivals, followed by a tour of Japan in the fall. A new studio album, tentatively scheduled for a late 2009 release, failed to materialize and on December 4, 2009, Tony Moore announced that he was no longer a member of Riot.

Nothing further was heard from the band for most of 2010 until on September 28, 2010, it was reported that Tony Moore had rejoined the band, with a new album set for release sometime in 2011.

On August 12, 2011, it was reported that final mixing was underway for the band's new album, Immortal Soul, which was released first in Japan on October 18 by Marquee Inc., Japan's Avalon label. It was released in Germany on October 28 and in Europe on October 31 and in November in North America, on the SPV label. Riot was to open for HammerFall on their "European Outbreak 2011" tour, with October and November dates confirmed, but this tour was canceled due to Tony Moore requiring emergency oral surgery.

On January 25, 2012, founding band member Mark Reale died of complications resulting from Crohn's disease at the age of 56. Immediately following his death, the band, featuring the "Thundersteel" lineup, performed several previously-booked east coast shows and the "70,000 Tons of Metal" cruise ship gig without him. A new Riot compilation was released following the shows, and at the request of Mark's father, the name "Riot" was put to rest. However, some former members of the "Thundersteel"-era lineup began work putting together a new band performing music in the same vein as Riot.

=== Second reunion as Riot V (2013–present) ===
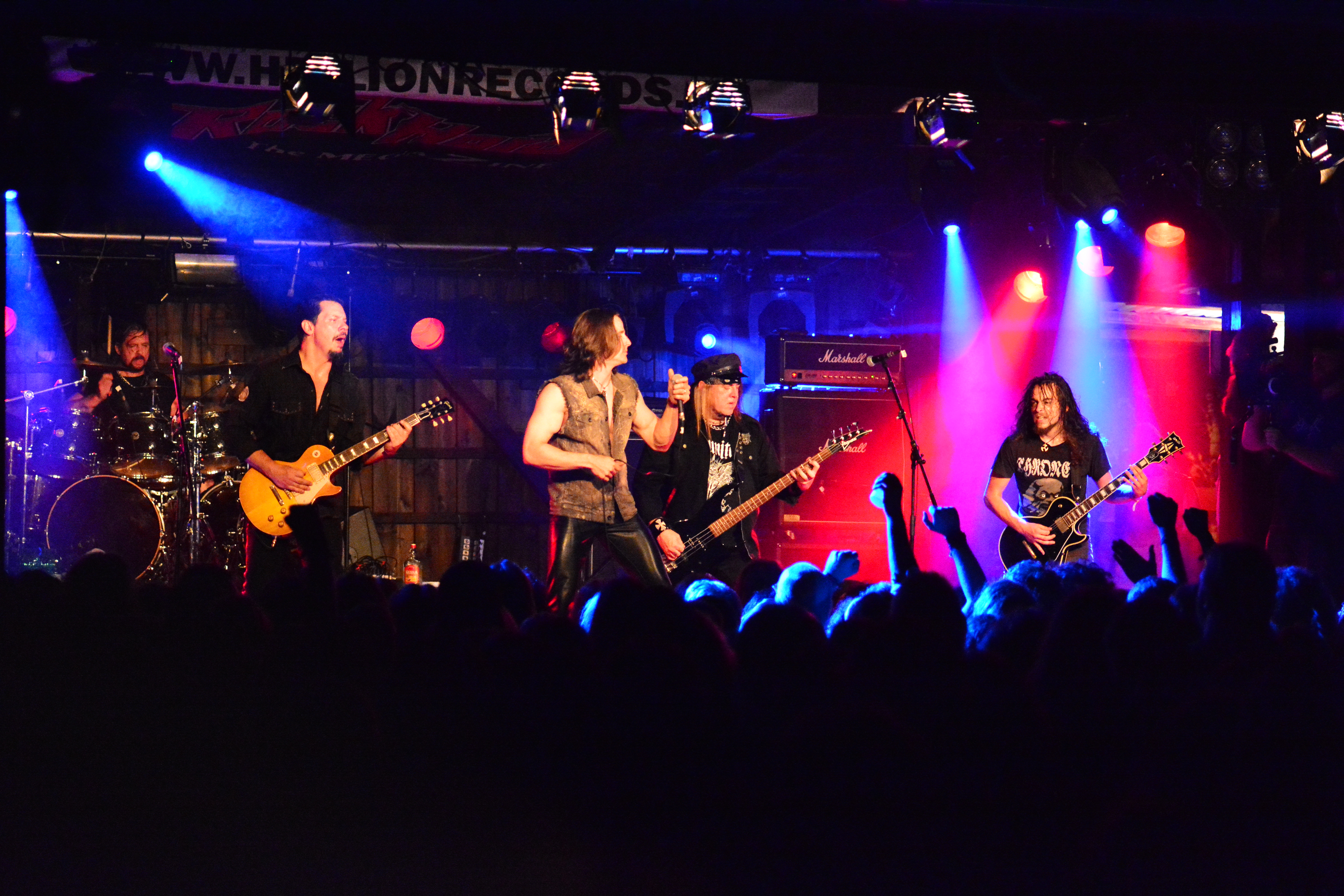
Riot V at Headbangers Open Air 2014

The band was officially re-launched as "Riot V", the name alluding to the addition of Todd Michael Hall as the fifth official singer, replacing Moore. Van Stavern revealed that Moore had chosen not to continue with the band to spend more time with his family.

In 2014, Nick Lee, a former student at the guitar classes run by Flyntz, joined as the new co-lead guitarist for the band, replacing deceased Reale, and Frank Gilchriest rejoined the band in place of Jarzombek, who had quit the band to focus on his activities with Fates Warning. Their new album Unleash The Fire was released in Japan, under the name Riot, in August 2014. This is the band's first release since the death of Reale.

Todd Michael Hall said about the "V" letter: "The official name for the band is Riot V, but we do have this confusion with the Japanese release versus the European release. I was told that the Japanese record label considered the release to be a continuation of the previous contract with "Riot", so they did not want to use the V". In 2024, the band released a new studio album, Mean Streets; it was originally slated for release in 2023, but was delayed by their record label. The band toured with Tailgunner in tow. Riot V made an appearance at the annual Sweden Rock Festival.

== Band members ==
=== Current ===
- Don Van Stavern – bass (1986–1990, 2008–2012, 2013–present)
- Mike Flyntz – guitar, backing vocals (1989–2012, 2013–present)
- Frank Gilchriest – drums (2003–2007, 2014–present)
- Valentino Francavilla – lead vocals (2026–present)
- Nick Lee – guitar (2014–present)

== Discography ==
- Rock City (1977)
- Narita (1979)
- Fire Down Under (1981)
- Restless Breed (1982)
- Born in America (1983)
- Thundersteel (1988)
- The Privilege of Power (1990)
- Nightbreaker (1993)
- The Brethren of the Long House (1995)
- Inishmore (1997)
- Sons of Society (1999)
- Through the Storm (2002)
- Army of One (2006)
- Immortal Soul (2011)
- Unleash the Fire (2014)
- Armor of Light (2018)
- Mean Streets (2024)
