= Mark Reale =

American guitarist (1955–2012)

- Mark Reale performing at Sweden Rock Festival in Solvesborg, June 2009

Background information
- Born: June 7, 1955; New York City, U.S.
- Died: January 25, 2012 (aged 56) San Antonio, Texas, U.S.
- Genres: Hard rock; heavy metal; speed metal; power metal
- Occupations: Musician; songwriter
- Instrument: Guitar
- Years active: 1974–2012
- Formerly of: Riot; Narita; Westworld; Bonnie Tyler
- Website: markreale.com

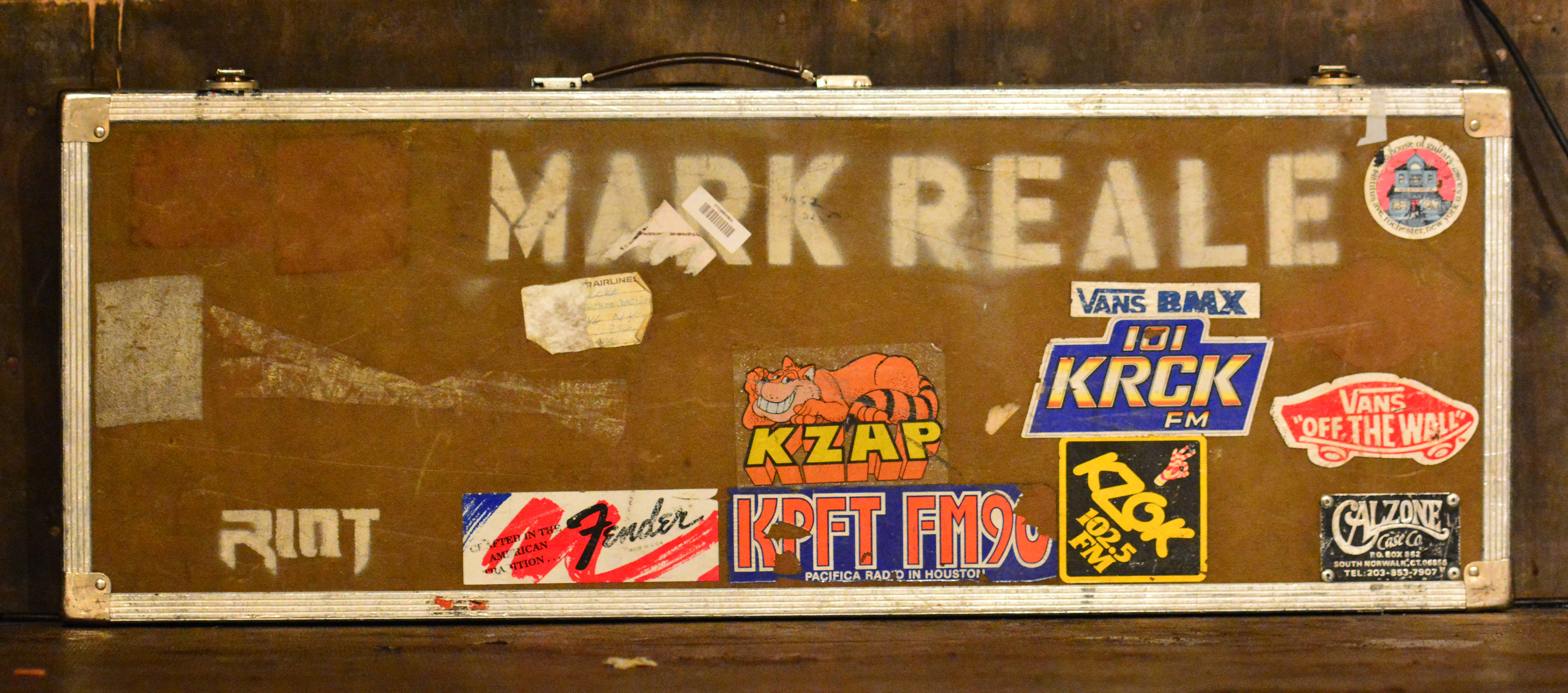
Guitar case by Reale on stage at the appearance of Riot V at Headbangers Open Air 2014

Mark Reale (June 7, 1955 – January 25, 2012) was an American guitarist who founded and led the heavy metal band Riot (now known as Riot V) in 1975. Riot experienced success and popularity in the early 1980s. He was the sole constant member of the band as well as its creative force. After Reale's death in 2012, remaining members of the band reformed the group a year later under the name Riot V.

== Biography ==
Reale was born in Brooklyn, New York in 1955. He grew up listening to the Beatles, Eric Clapton, Gary Moore, Ritchie Blackmore, and listed George Harrison as being one of his greatest influences. After attending concerts by Ronnie Montrose, Rick Derringer, and Edgar Winter he decided to become a guitarist, forming the band Riot in 1975 who are still active.

Mark Reale was the principal songwriter and main creative force behind Riot beginning with the band's 1977 debut album Rock City. The group's most acclaimed album was 1981's seminal Fire Down Under, the last of three studio albums featuring original vocalist Guy Speranza. Other notable records include Restless Breed (1982), the band's comeback album, Thundersteel (1988), and its follow-up, The Privilege of Power (1990). Riot's last album with Reale was Immortal Soul, released in 2011. Riot has toured the world and been a support act for major acts including Kiss, AC/DC, Sammy Hagar, Molly Hatchet, and Rush while maintaining a particularly strong fanbase in Japan and continental Europe.

Riot temporary broke up after Born In America (1983) was released. Reale formed a short-lived outfit named Narita with former members of S.A. Slayer including future Riot bassist Don Van Stavern. The band recorded a sole demo in 1984 before calling it quits. Reale decided to re-activate Riot leading to a record deal with CBS Records and the Thundersteel album in 1988. In 1998, Reale co-founded the group Westworld with vocalist Tony Harnell of TNT fame. Westworld released three studio albums and a live disc between 1999 and 2002.

=== Death ===
On January 25, 2012, Reale died of complications related to Crohn's disease. He had Crohn's disease most of his life and had been in a coma since January 11 due to a subarachnoid hemorrhage.

== Discography ==
=== with Riot ===
- Rock City (1977)
- Narita (1979)
- Fire Down Under (1981)
- Restless Breed (1982)
- Born In America (1983)
- Thundersteel (1988)
- The Privilege of Power (1990)
- Nightbreaker (1993)
- The Brethren of the Long House (1996)
- Inishmore (1998)
- Shine On Live In Japan (1998)
- Sons of Society (1999)
- Through the Storm (2002)
- Army of One (2006)
- Immortal Soul (2011)

=== with Westworld ===
- Westworld (1999)
- Skin (2000)
- Live... In the Flesh (2001)
- Cyberdreams (2002)
