= Greene St. Recording =

Closed recording studio in Manhattan, New York

Coordinates: 40.72462°N 73.99946°W

- Founded: 1970s
- Founder: Jeffrey Lew; Michael Reisman
- Defunct: 2001
- Genre: Hip-hop, pop, alternative rock, R&B, rock
- Country of origin: United States

Greene St. Recording was a New York City recording studio, located at 112 Greene Street in SoHo, Manhattan, until its closure in 2001. It was one of the early headquarters of hip hop music during the 1980s and 1990s.

== History ==
=== Background ===
In the early 1970s, Jeffrey Lew and Michael Reisman founded 112 Greene St. Recording Studio as a private recording studio used by its owners and their friends. In the summer of 1975, the owners realized that the cost of running the studio for themselves and their friends was not sustainable. Lew approached his and Philip Glass' friend, Peter McKenzie, to manage the recording studio and bring in outside commercial business so the studio could financially support itself. McKenzie, whose family Bob Dylan had lived with in 1961 when McKenzie was 15, agreed to work for the studio, using his connections to bring in new recording clients, such as Ashford & Simpson, which improved the studio's income enough to keep it viable. Later in 1975, Lew wanted to divest his share of the studio, which was sold to two clients referred by McKenzie, Billy Arnell and Steve Loeb. The transition was not smooth, as it had been agreed that McKenzie would be paid 10% of the purchase price paid for shares of the studio by any buyer he had referred, and McKenzie was denied this payment after the sale was completed. A lawsuit followed, McKenzie was paid and parted ways with the studio.

The studio was renamed Big Apple Recording and became a partnership between Michael Riesman and producer Steve Loeb. The new studio manager was Jonathan Katz, who would later make a name for himself as "Dr Katz", a popular albeit cartoon figure on Comedy Central, and the first studio chief engineer was Wieslaw Woszczyk, now Dr. Wieslaw Woszczyk, who holds the James McGill Chair Professorship in Sound Recording and is the founding director of the Centre for Interdisciplinary Research in Music Media and Technology at McGill University.

=== Greene St. Recording ===
In 1983, Loeb bought out Riesman and became the sole owner of the studio, which was renamed "Greene St. Recording". Former Woszczyk assistant Rod Hui became chief engineer and Robyn Sansone became studio manager. In the first year as Greene St. under Loeb, Hui and Sansone, Greene Street recorded and mixed a number of records, including the three groundbreaking hits Shannon's "Let The Music Play", Kurtis Blow's "The Breaks" and Run DMC's "It's Like That".

In 1983, Dave Harrington commenced as studio manager. The studio's engineering team included Rod Hui, Nick Sansano, Jamey Staub, Andrew Spigelman, Chris Shaw, Phil Painson, Prince Strickland, Charlie Dos Santos, Chris Champion, Djini Brown, and Danny Madorsky. In 1986, Greene St. underwent renovation, and an additional two rooms were added to the studio, in which the studio owners installed audio technology that was new to New York at the time (an AMEK APC 1000 mixing desk, with Massenburg moving fader automation, and a pair of Roger Quested tri-amped speaker systems).

On August 24, 2014, Chuck D of the hip hop group Public Enemy posted a photo on his Twitter profile of a cassette tape from the Greene St. studio. The tape's label is branded with the studio's branding and a hand-written title indicates that the studio was used for the recording of the song "Fight The Power."

== Recording history ==
The list of artists who recorded at the Greene St. studio includes: Run–D.M.C., Public Enemy, LL Cool J, Sonic Youth, New Order, Ice Cube, Riot, Bonnie Tyler, Chaka Khan, James Brown, Pete Rock & CL Smooth, Jenny Burton, John Robie, Afrika Bambaataa, Dave Matthews Band, the Italian Nino Buonocore, George Benson, Roy Ayers, Black Eyed Peas, De La Soul, Salt n Pepa, A Tribe Called Quest, George Clinton, Heavy D, Beastie Boys, Mos Def, Talib Kweli, Black Thought, Inspectah Deck, Raekwon, DJ Muggs, Tricky, Jungle Brothers, Propellerheads, IAM and You Am I.

Producer Pete Rock frequently recorded at the studio, having liked the equalizer that was used there, which gave many of his productions a wah-wah effect. Sonic Youth recorded their seminal career defining album "Daydream Nation" here.

== Post-closure ==
Soon after the closure of Greene St. Recording, owner Steve Loeb, along with record producer artist John Robie, launched The Combine at 112 Greene Street. The new space presented a multimedia urban art project entitled "Work To Do" that featured 52 urban/graffiti artists. In 2011 the space was rejoined with the upper floor, reforming its original configuration, and leased to fashion designer Stella McCartney, daughter of Beatles bassist Sir Paul McCartney. A December 2011 media article showed that Stella McCartney continued to use the 5,200-square-foot space for her flagship retail outlet at that time.

== See also ==
- Audio engineer
- History of sound recording
