= 2019 in rock music =

This article summarizes the events related to rock music for the year of 2019.

== Notable events ==
=== January ===
- Godsmack's single "When Legends Rise" tops the Billboard Mainstream Rock Songs chart for five weeks, in a run that began in December 2018. It is their ninth song to top the chart.
- The Glorious Sons single "S.O.S. (Sawed Off Shotgun)" tops the Mainstream Rock songs chart, their first song to do so. It stays there for four weeks.
- Bring Me the Horizon's sixth studio album, Amo, named one of the most anticipated albums of 2019, is released. It is released to mixed reception; it is the number one selling album in its week of release in the UK and Australia, but fares much worse in the US, debuting at number 14, and selling only 16,000 copies, a 75% decrease from their prior album, That's the Spirit.
- Maynard James Keenan announces that he has finished recording vocals for Tool's fifth studio album, their first since 2006's 10,000 Days, though work still remains in finalizing the album.
- Third Eye Blind and Jimmy Eat World announce a co-headlining North American summer tour, billed as a 25th anniversary for both bands since they started touring.
- Greta Van Fleet performs two songs live on the nationally televised Saturday Night Live, "Black Smoke Rising" and "You're the One".

=== February ===
- Ghost's single "Dance Macabre" tops the Mainstream Rock chart for two weeks. It is their third song to top it, all since 2017.
- Five Finger Death Punch's single "When the Seasons Change" tops the Mainstream Rock Chart for a week.
- Greta Van Fleet wins the Grammy Award for Best Rock Album for their release From the Fires.
- Katatonia announce their return from hiatusin time to celebrate the tenth anniversary of their album Night Is the New Day.

=== March ===
- Greta Van Fleet's single "You're the One" tops the Mainstream Rock Chart. It is the band's fourth single in a row to do so. They tie The Pretty Reckless as the only band to have their first four official singles to top the chart. It stays atop of the chart for 2 weeks.
- Disturbed's single "A Reason to Fight" tops the Mainstream Rock chart. It is their sixth single in a row to top it, a record for the chart. It is the band's ninth song to top the chart. It stays at the top of the chart for three weeks.
- Rival Sons's single "Do Your Worst" tops the Mainstream Rock chart for a week.
- A documentary about New Zealand rock band The Chills premières at the annual SXSW festival and then released in cinemas throughout Australia and New Zealand and on Prime TV in New Zealand.
- Pulp Summer Slam takes place at the Amaranto Center in Quezon City in the Philippines, with Slayer headlining. Other acts include Gojira, Kreator, Dimmu Borgir and Thy Art Is Murder.

=== April ===
- I Prevail's second album, Trauma debuts at number 4 on the Billboard Top Album Sales chart. It places at number 14 overall on the Billboard 200 chart.
- Three Days Grace's single "Right Left Wrong" tops the Billboard Mainstream Rock chart for three weeks. It is the band's fifteenth song to top it, the most in the charts history of existence.
- Five Finger Death Punch single "Blue on Black", a cover of the song by Kenny Wayne Shepherd Band, peaks at number 66 on the US all-format Billboard Hot 100 songs chart, a rare feat for a hard rock/metal band in 2019. This version of the song features band member Ivan Moody and country musician Brantley Gilbert on vocals, Kenny Wayne Shepherd on guitar, and a guitar solo by Queen guitarist Brian May.
- Russian alternative rock band Slot preview their new album at a concert in St Petersburg on April 14.

=== May ===
- The Black Keys single "Lo/Hi" tops the Billboard Mainstream Rock chart for three weeks. Despite the band's popularity on the Alternative Songs chart in the past, this is the band's first song to top the Mainstream Rock chart. The song eventually simultaneously tops four Billboard Rock charts: Mainstream Rock, Alternative Songs, Adult Alternative Songs, and Rock Airplay. It is the first song to top all four simultaneously, and only the second song to do it ever.

=== June ===
- The Raconteurs release their third studio album, and first in over a decade, Help Us Stranger. It tops the all-format Billboard 200 albums chart, selling album equivalent units and beating the debut release of Lil Nas X, the artist at the top of the Billboard Hot 100 at the time.
- The Black Keys release their ninth studio album, Let's Rock, their first in five years. Let's Rock debuted at number four on the US Billboard 200, totaling 52,000 album-equivalent units in its first week.
- Five Finger Death Punch's single "Blue on Black" also tops the Billboard Mainstream Rock Songs chart, and stays there for 4 consecutive weeks.
- Shinedown's single "Monsters" tops the Billboard Mainstream Rock Songs chart for a week. It is their fourteenth song to top the chart, the second highest in the history of the chart, one behind Three Days Grace at fifteen.
- The Rolling Stones begin the North American leg of their No Filter tour, two months after Mick Jagger has surgery for a heart condition.

=== July ===
- Five Finger Death Punch's single "Blue on Black" returns to the top of the Billboard Mainstream Rock Songs chart for another week.
- Bad Wolves single "Remember When" tops the Billboard Mainstream Rock Songs chart for two weeks. It is their second song to top the chart.
- After more than 20 years as drummer for Sleater-Kinney, Janet Weiss announces her departure from the band.

=== August ===
- Tool releases their first album in 13 years, Fear Inoculum. It tops the US Billboard 200 all-format albums chart, selling 270,000 album equivalent units in its opening week, making it has the biggest debut for a rock album in 2019.
- Weeks prior to the album's release, Tool also, for the first time, released all of their back catalog onto digital download and music streaming platforms, the band being one of the few main acts left to do so. The re-releases spur massive spikes in the band's prior albums, the most being Aenima, which rises 5,900% percent places on number 10 on the Billboard 200 chart, moving 33,000 album equivalent units.
- The re-releases also affect the song charts: Tool becomes the first in history to occupy all ten spots in the top 10 Billboard Rock Digital Songs chart. Overall, they occupy 15 of the top 25 spots as well.
- Tool's first single, "Fear Inoculum", debuts at number 93 on the Billboard all-format Hot 100 song chart. Not only is this rare for a rock band in 2019, and extremely rare for progressive rock music, but, at 10 minutes and 21 seconds in length, becomes the longest song of all time to ever chart on the Hot 100 chart.
- Slipknot releases their sixth studio album, We Are Not Your Kind. The album tops the US Billboard 200 album chart, moving 118,000 album equivalent units. It was the band's third number one album in the US in a row, and the first hard rock album since the Foo Fighters 2017 album Concrete and Gold to top the chart.
- The Pillows open a temporary museum called "Buster's Diner" in Tokyo.

=== September ===
- Tool's album Fear Inoculum holds into the top 10 of the Billboard 200 in its second week, charting at number 7 and moving another 38,000 album equivalent units.
- Blink 182 releases their ninth studio album, Nine. It debuts at number 3 on the Billboard 200, moving 94,000 album equivalent units.
- The Beatles' album Abbey Road is remixed and released, topping the charts in UK once again.
- Disturbed's single "No More" tops the Mainstream Rock chart, the band's seventh single in a row to top the chart. It stays there for four weeks.

=== October ===
- Dirty Honey's single "When I'm Gone" tops the Billboard Mainstream Rock chart, making them the first band ever without a music label to top the chart.
- On Halloween, My Chemical Romance announces the band will be reforming after 6 years.

=== November ===
- Papa Roach's single "Come Around" tops the Billboard Mainstream Rock songs chart. It is their fifth song to top the chart since 2009.
- Coldplay releases their eighth studio album, Everyday Life. The album releases to mixed commercial response; it tops the UK album's chart, and is the third highest debut of 2019 there, but only debuts at number 8 on the US Billboard 200 chart, moving 48,000 album-equivalent units. Their prior album, A Head Full of Dreams sold four times as much in 2015, when it debuted at number 2 with 210,000 album equivalent units in 2015.
- Rage Against the Machine announces they are reuniting in 2020 to play Coachella.
- Colombian rock musician Juanes is honoured as the 2019 Latin Recording Academy Person of the Year with a tribute concert on November 13 in Las Vegas, United States.

=== December ===
- Vicky Cornell, widow of Chris Cornell, sues the remaining band members of Soundgarden over the legal rights to the remaining vocal tracks from Chris Cornell recorded in 2017 prior to his death. The band members believe the recording were meant to be used for Soundgarden and wish to use them to release a final studio album, while Vicky believes they were not explicitly designated as Soundgarden material. Both parties want to retain creative control over the material.
- The Who release their twelfth studio album, and their first in over thirteen years titled Who. The album peaked number three on UK all-format chart (OOC) and number two on the US Billboard 200. in the weekly charts.

=== Year end ===
- Tool's Fear Inoculum is the seventh best-selling album of 2019 among all albums in the US.
- Billboard calculates Panic at the Disco as the top artist of the Hot Rock Songs chart, and Disturbed as the top artist of the Mainstream Rock songs chart.
- Bad Wolves single "Remember When" tops the year-end Mainstream Rock songs chart. Shinedown's "Monsters was the second most popular song of the year.
- Mark Tremonti of Alter Bridge and Tremonti is named "Guitarist of the Decade" by Guitar World.

== Deaths ==
- January 1 – Kris Kelmi, Russian rock musician, dies of a cardiac arrest caused by alcohol abuse, aged 63.
- January 11 – Marc Paganini, founder of Swiss hard rock band Paganini, dies aged 57.
- January 16
  - Lorna Doom, bassist of US punk rock band Germs, dies of breast cancer, aged 60
  - Filipino rock drummer Brian Velasco of Razorback commits suicide, aged 41.
- January 17
  - Ron Watson, guitarist of Canadian hard rock band Helix, dies aged 62 of multiple myeloma
  - Reggie Young of The Memphis Boys, Elvis Presley backing musician, dies aged 82
- January 25 – Bruce Corbitt, US heavy metal vocalist (Rigor Mortis), dies of esophageal cancer, aged 56
- January 28
  - Pepe Smith, Filipino-American singer-songwriter and musician and pioneer of Pinoy rock, dies aged 71
  - Paul Whaley, US heavy metal drummer, dies aged 72
- February 9 – Guy Webster, US photographer, known for his work with bands such as The Rolling Stones, dies aged 79
- February 12 – Olli Lindholm, Finnish rock singer and guitarist (Yö) dies of an aortic rupture, aged 54
- February 13 – Willy Lambregt, guitarist of Belgian punk band The Scabs, dies of cancer, aged 59
- February 21 – Gerard Koerts, of Dutch progressive rock band Earth and Fire, dies aged 71
- February 26 – Andy Anderson, British drummer, died of cancer, aged 68
- February 28 – Stephan Ellis, bassist of US rock band Survivor, dies aged 69
- March 1 – Paul Williams, British blues and rock singer and musician, dies aged 78
- March 4 – Keith Flint, British singer (The Prodigy), commits suicide, aged 49
- March 5 – Sara Romweber, drummer of US rock band Let's Active, dies of a brain tumor, aged 55
- March 11
  - The Wrecking Crew drummer Hal Blaine dies aged 90
  - Danny Kustow, British guitarist of the Tom Robinson Band, dies of pneumonia and liver infection, aged 63 || March 11, 2019 || U.S. ||
- March 12 – John Kilzer, US rock singer and songwriter, commits suicide, aged 62
- March 16 – Dick Dale, guitarist and pioneer of surf rock, dies on March 16.
- March 17
  - Bernie Tormé, Irish rock musician, songwriter and executive, dies of pneumonia, aged 66
  - Yuya Uchida, Japanese singer and record producer, dies aged 79.
- March 26 – Ranking Roger, British vocalist of The Beat, dies of lung cancer and brain tumor, aged 56
- March 27 – Norwegian musician Audun Laading, aged 25, and British musician Stephen Fitzpatrick, aged 24 (the duo Her's), are killed in a traffic collision
- April 3 – Shawn Smith, US alternative rock singer, songwriter and musician, dies of a torn aorta, aged 53
- April 13 – Paul Raymond, British keyboardist and guitarist, dies of a heart attack, aged 73
- April 24 – Dick Rivers, French singer and actor, pioneer of French rock & roll, dies of cancer, aged 74
- April 25 – Michiro Endo, vocalist of The Stalin, dies on April 25.
- May 14 – Mike Wilhelm, US rock musician and songwriter, dies of cancer, aged 77
- May 17 – Eric Moore, US rock singer (The Godz, dies of bladder cancer, aged 67
- May 18 – Terry Evans, US drummer (The Godz, dies suddenly aged 55
- May 31 – Roky Erickson, US psychedelic rock musician (The 13th Floor Elevators), dies aged 71
- June 2 – Paulo P. A. Pagni, drummer of Brazilian band RPM, dies aged 61
- June 6 – Dr. John, US multi-genre musician, dies of a heart attack, aged 77
- June 8 – Andre Matos, Brazilian heavy metal vocalist, musician, producer, and composer, dies of a heart attack, aged 47
- June 21 – Kelly Jay Fordham, keyboardist of Canadian band Crowbar, dies of a stroke, aged 77
- June 23 – Dave Bartholomew, US multi-genre musician and rock & roll pioneer, dies of heart failure, aged 100
- June 29 – Gary Duncan, US musician, singer and songwriter (Quicksilver Messenger Service, dies of complications from a seizure, aged 72
- July 2 – Ibrahim Emin, Azerbaijani rock musician (Yukhu), dies aged 56
- July 6 – Thommy Gustafsson, keyboardist of Swedish band Sven-Ingvars, dies aged 71
- July 8 – James Henke, US Rolling Stone Magazine journalist and curator of the Rock and Roll Hall of Fame, dies aged 65, suffering from dementia
- July 12 – Dick Richards, US drummer (Bill Haley & His Comets), dies aged 95
- July 16 – Johnny Clegg, South African musician, dies of pancreatic cancer, aged 66
- August 1 – Ian Gibbons, British musician (The Kinks), dies of bladder cancer, aged 67
- August 2 – Nigel Benjamin, British rock musician (Mott the Hoople), dies of a heart condition, aged 64
- August 3 – Damien Lovelock, Australian rock singer songwriter and broadcaster, dies of cancer, aged 65
- August 5 – Lizzie Grey, US heavy metal musician, dies of Lewy body disease, aged 60
- August 7 – David Berman, founder of the indie-rock band Silver Jews, commits suicide, aged 52, shortly after releasing a new album under the name Purple Mountains.
- August 18 – George "G.G." Guidotti, US heavy metal bassist (Heaven's Edge), dies of lung cancer, aged 57
- August 19 – Larry Taylor, US bass guitarist (Canned Heat), dies aged 77
- September 10 – Jeff Fenholt, US singer, Broadway's original "Jesus Christ Superstar", dies aged 68
- September 13 – Eddie Money, US singer, dies aged 70
- September 15 – Ric Ocasek, US singer, songwriter, musician and record producer, dies aged 75
- September 18 – Tony Mills, UK vocalist for Norwegian band TNT, dies of pancreatic cancer, aged 57
- October 2 – Morten Stutzer, Danish thrash metal musician (Artillery), dies of blood clot, aged 57
- October 6 – Ginger Baker, British drummer (Cream), dies aged 80
- November 7
  - Ivan Maksimović, Serbian rock guitarist, died aged 57
  - Gilles Bertin, French punk rock singer and bassist, dies aged 58
- December 2 – Greedy Smith, Australian new wave singer and keyboardist (Mental as Anything), dies aged 63
- December 5 – Rick Bryant, New Zealand blues and rock singer/songwriter, dies, aged 71.
- December 9 – Marie Fredriksson, Swedish singer (Roxette), dies aged 61

== Break ups ==
- Lower Than Atlantis
- Prophets of Rage
- Negoto (Japanese rock band) disband at the end of a tour, on July 20.
