= Immortalized =

Immortalized may refer to:

== Music ==
=== Albums ===
- Immortalized (3X Krazy album)
- Immortalized (Disturbed album)
- Immortalized (Spice 1 album)

=== Songs ===
- Immortalized (song), by Disturbed from the album of the same name
- "Immortalized", by HammerFall from the album Infected
- "Immortalize", by Crown the Empire from the album Dogma

== Other uses ==
- Biological immortality, where death occurs from injury or disease rather than deterioration
  - Immortalized cell line, cells that have acquired the ability to proliferate indefinitely
