= Still Here =

Still Here may refer to:

== Music ==
=== Albums ===
- Still Here (The Beasts album), 2019
- Still Here (John Mark Nelson album) 2011
- Still Here, by Ian Thomas Band, 1978
- Still Here, by Gæleri, 1999
- Still Here (The Temptations album), 2010
- Still Here, by the Williams Brothers, 2003
- Still Here, an EP by Iann Dior, 2021
- Still Here, by KR$NA, 2021
- Still, Here, 2022 album by Marisa Anderson

=== Songs ===
- "Still Here", by Drake from Views, 2016
- "Still Here", by Natasha Bedingfield from N.B., 2008
- "Still Here!", by Oh Land from Fauna, 2008
- "Still Here", by Seungmin from SKZ-Replay 2026 Pt.1, 2026
- "Still Here", by Snoop Dogg from Neva Left, 2017
- "Still Here", by Westlife from The Love Album, 2006

== Other uses ==
- Still Here (film), a 2020 American crime drama film by Vlad Feier
- Still Here (TV series), a 2023 Polish comedy drama series
- Still/Here, a 1994 documentary film by Bill T. Jones
- Still Here, a 2002 novel by Linda Grant
- Still Here (brand), a New York fashion brand
