= 2016 in downloadable songs for the Rock Band series =

- Songs released: 173
- Packs released: 17
- Albums released: 0

The Rock Band series of music video games supports downloadable songs for the Xbox One and PlayStation 4 versions through the consoles' respective online services. Users can download songs on a track-by-track basis, with many of the tracks also offered as part of a "song pack" or complete album at a discounted rate.

== List of songs released in 2016 ==
The following table lists the available songs for the Rock Band series released in 2016. All songs available in packs are also available as individual song downloads on the same date, unless otherwise noted. Dates listed are the initial release of songs on PlayStation Network and Xbox Live.

Starting from October 6, 2015, all music added to the downloadable content catalog is exclusive to Rock Band 4. In addition, due to changes in the charting format and gameplay of Rock Band 4, the released songs no longer support keyboard or Pro guitar and bass (future downloadable content will continue to support vocal harmonies and Pro drum charts), and most songs no longer display "family friendly" or "supervision recommended" ratings. Downloadable content from previous Rock Band titles (excepting The Beatles: Rock Band) is forward-compatible in Rock Band 4 within the same system family (Xbox 360 downloads are usable in the Xbox One version and PlayStation 3 downloads are usable in the PlayStation 4 version) at no additional cost.

| Song title | Artist | Year | Genre | Single / Pack name | Release date |
|---|---|---|---|---|---|
| "Immortalized" (Note: Song is no longer available for purchase.) | Disturbed | 2015 | Nu-Metal | Disturbed 04 | Jan 12, 2016 |
| "The Vengeful One" | Disturbed | 2015 | Nu-Metal | Disturbed 04 | Jan 12, 2016 |
| "Warrior" | Disturbed | 2010 | Nu-Metal | Disturbed 04 | Jan 12, 2016 |
| "My Wave" | Soundgarden | 1994 | Grunge | Single | Jan 19, 2016 |
| "Wicked Garden" | Stone Temple Pilots | 1992 | Alternative | Single | Jan 19, 2016 |
| "Hunger Strike" | Temple of the Dog | 1991 | Grunge | Single | Jan 19, 2016 |
| "Get Lucky" | Daft Punk ft. Pharrell Williams | 2013 | Pop/Dance/Electronic | Single | Feb 2, 2016 |
| "Heartbeat Song" | Kelly Clarkson | 2015 | Pop/Dance/Electronic | Single | Feb 2, 2016 |
| "Hey Ya!" | Outkast | 2003 | Hip-Hop/Rap | Single | Feb 2, 2016 |
| "Locked Out of Heaven" | Bruno Mars | 2012 | Pop-Rock | Single | Feb 9, 2016 |
| "Treasure" | Bruno Mars | 2012 | Pop-Rock | Single | Feb 9, 2016 |
| "Dancing with Myself" | Generation X | 1981 | Punk | Single | Feb 9, 2016 |
| "Love Stinks" | The J. Geils Band | 1980 | Rock | Single | Feb 9, 2016 |
| "I Hate Myself for Loving You" | Joan Jett & the Blackhearts | 1988 | Punk | Single | Feb 9, 2016 |
| "Speed Fighter" | Masaya Matsuura | 2014 | Pop/Dance/Electronic | Single | Feb 9, 2016 |
| "Still the One" | Orleans | 1976 | Rock | Single | Feb 9, 2016 |
| "Got Your Six" | Five Finger Death Punch | 2015 | Metal | Single | Feb 16, 2016 |
| "Thunder & Lightning" | Motörhead | 2015 | Metal | Single | Feb 16, 2016 |
| "Figure It Out" | Royal Blood | 2014 | Rock | Single | Feb 16, 2016 |
| "Chicken Fried" | Zac Brown Band | 2008 | Country | Zac Brown Band 01 | Feb 23, 2016 |
| "Homegrown" | Zac Brown Band | 2015 | Country | Zac Brown Band 01 | Feb 23, 2016 |
| "The Wind" | Zac Brown Band | 2012 | Country | Zac Brown Band 01 | Feb 23, 2016 |
| "Best Song Ever" | One Direction | 2013 | Pop/Dance/Electronic | One Direction 01 | Mar 8, 2016 |
| "Never Enough" | One Direction | 2015 | Pop/Dance/Electronic | One Direction 01 | Mar 8, 2016 |
| "Story of My Life" | One Direction | 2013 | Pop/Dance/Electronic | One Direction 01 | Mar 8, 2016 |
| "What Makes You Beautiful" | One Direction | 2011 | Pop/Dance/Electronic | One Direction 01 | Mar 8, 2016 |
| "Zombie" | The Cranberries | 1994 | Alternative | The Cranberries 01 | Mar 15, 2016 |
| "Ode to My Family" | The Cranberries | 1994 | Alternative | The Cranberries 01 | Mar 15, 2016 |
| "Dreams" | The Cranberries | 1993 | Alternative | The Cranberries 01 | Mar 15, 2016 |
| "She Looks So Perfect" | 5 Seconds of Summer | 2014 | Pop-Rock | Off the Charts 03 | Mar 22, 2016 |
| "My Songs Know What You Did in the Dark (Light Em Up)" | Fall Out Boy | 2013 | Pop-Rock | Off the Charts 03 | Mar 22, 2016 |
| "Everybody Talks" | Neon Trees | 2012 | Pop-Rock | Off the Charts 03 | Mar 22, 2016 |
| "That's My Kind of Night" | Luke Bryan | 2013 | Country | Going Country 09 | Mar 29, 2016 |
| "House Party" | Sam Hunt | 2014 | Country | Going Country 09 | Mar 29, 2016 |
| "Blown Away" | Carrie Underwood | 2012 | Country | Going Country 09 | Mar 29, 2016 |
| "Day Late, Dollar Short" (Note: Song was previously included in Rock Band.) (Note: Song is only available in a pack and cannot be downloaded individually.) | The Acro-Brats | 2006 | Rock | Rock Band 4 30-Song Mega Pack | Apr 5, 2016 |
| "Blood Doll" | Anarchy Club | 2007 | Rock | Rock Band 4 30-Song Mega Pack | Apr 5, 2016 |
| "Get Clean" (Note: Song was previously included in Rock Band 2.) | Anarchy Club | 2009 | Metal | Rock Band 4 30-Song Mega Pack | Apr 5, 2016 |
| "Night Lies" | Bang Camaro | 2008 | Rock | Rock Band 4 30-Song Mega Pack | Apr 5, 2016 |
| "Pleasure (Pleasure)" | Bang Camaro | 2007 | Rock | Rock Band 4 30-Song Mega Pack | Apr 5, 2016 |
| "Push Push, Lady Lightning" | Bang Camaro | 2007 | Rock | Rock Band 4 30-Song Mega Pack | Apr 5, 2016 |
| "Lodger" | Blanks. | 2009 | Indie Rock | Rock Band 4 30-Song Mega Pack | Apr 5, 2016 |
| "Shoulder to the Plow" | Breaking Wheel | 2008 | Metal | Rock Band 4 30-Song Mega Pack | Apr 5, 2016 |
| "Shake" (Note: Song was previously released as DLC for Rock Band at a reduced price of 99 cents.) | Count Zero | 2008 | Rock | Rock Band 4 30-Song Mega Pack | Apr 5, 2016 |
| "Can't Let Go" | Death of the Cool | 2007 | Rock | Rock Band 4 30-Song Mega Pack | Apr 5, 2016 |
| "The Heist" | DnA's Evolution | 2009 | Rock | Rock Band 4 30-Song Mega Pack | Apr 5, 2016 |
| "Blink" | Father Octopus | 2010 | Rock | Rock Band 4 30-Song Mega Pack | Apr 5, 2016 |
| "Brainpower" | Freezepop | 2007 | Pop/Dance/Electronic | Rock Band 4 30-Song Mega Pack | Apr 5, 2016 |
| "Get Ready 2 Rokk" | Freezepop | 2000 | Pop/Dance/Electronic | Rock Band 4 30-Song Mega Pack | Apr 5, 2016 |
| "Less Talk More Rokk" | Freezepop | 2007 | Pop/Dance/Electronic | Rock Band 4 30-Song Mega Pack | Apr 5, 2016 |
| "Sprode" | Freezepop | 2003 | Pop/Dance/Electronic | Rock Band 4 30-Song Mega Pack | Apr 5, 2016 |
| "Signs" | Giant Target | 2009 | Punk | Rock Band 4 30-Song Mega Pack | Apr 5, 2016 |
| "Entangled" | Honest Bob and the Factory-to-Dealer Incentives | 2008 | Indie Rock | Rock Band 4 30-Song Mega Pack | Apr 5, 2016 |
| "I Get By" | Honest Bob and the Factory-to-Dealer Incentives | 2007 | Indie Rock | Rock Band 4 30-Song Mega Pack | Apr 5, 2016 |
| "A Jagged Gorgeous Winter" | The Main Drag | 2008 | Indie Rock | Rock Band 4 30-Song Mega Pack | Apr 5, 2016 |
| "Don't Let Me Down (Slowly)" | The Main Drag | 2009 | Indie Rock | Rock Band 4 30-Song Mega Pack | Apr 5, 2016 |
| "What's Your Favorite Dinosaur?" | The Main Drag | 2008 | Indie Rock | Rock Band 4 30-Song Mega Pack | Apr 5, 2016 |
| "Megasus" | Megasus | 2008 | Metal | Rock Band 4 30-Song Mega Pack | Apr 5, 2016 |
| "Conventional Lover" | Speck | 2007 | Pop-Rock | Rock Band 4 30-Song Mega Pack | Apr 5, 2016 |
| "Synthesized" | Symbion Project | 2003 | Pop/Dance/Electronic | Rock Band 4 30-Song Mega Pack | Apr 5, 2016 |
| "Rob the Prez-O-Dent" | That Handsome Devil | 2008 | Rock | Rock Band 4 30-Song Mega Pack | Apr 5, 2016 |
| "No Mercy" | Tijuana Sweetheart | 2009 | Punk | Rock Band 4 30-Song Mega Pack | Apr 5, 2016 |
| "Seven" | Tijuana Sweetheart | 2007 | Punk | Rock Band 4 30-Song Mega Pack | Apr 5, 2016 |
| "Trash Candy" | Tijuana Sweetheart | 2009 | Punk | Rock Band 4 30-Song Mega Pack | Apr 5, 2016 |
| "Outside" | Tribe | 1989 | Rock | Rock Band 4 30-Song Mega Pack | Apr 5, 2016 |
| "Cake by the Ocean" | DNCE | 2015 | Pop-Rock | Off the Charts 04 | Apr 11, 2016 |
| "Stressed Out" (Note: Song later included in the pack Twenty One Pilots 01.) | Twenty One Pilots | 2015 | Alternative | Off the Charts 04 | Apr 11, 2016 |
| "The Hills" | The Weeknd | 2015 | Pop/Dance/Electronic | Off the Charts 04 | Apr 11, 2016 |
| "Sorry" | Justin Bieber | 2015 | Pop/Dance/Electronic | Justin Bieber 01 | Apr 19, 2016 |
| "Boyfriend" | Justin Bieber | 2012 | Pop/Dance/Electronic | Justin Bieber 01 | Apr 19, 2016 |
| "Love Yourself" | Justin Bieber | 2015 | Pop/Dance/Electronic | Justin Bieber 01 | Apr 19, 2016 |
| "Redneck" | Lamb of God | 2006 | Metal | Single | Apr 26, 2016 |
| "What I Like About You" | The Romantics | 1980 | Pop-Rock | Single | Apr 26, 2016 |
| "Dope Nose" | Weezer | 2002 | Alternative | Single | Apr 26, 2016 |
| "Don't Do Me Like That" | Tom Petty and the Heartbreakers | 1979 | Rock | Single | May 10, 2016 |
| "Learning to Fly" | Tom Petty and the Heartbreakers | 1991 | Rock | Single | May 10, 2016 |
| "Breakfast at Tiffany's" | Deep Blue Something | 1995 | Alternative | Single | May 17, 2016 |
| "Take Me to Church" | Hozier | 2014 | Indie Rock | Single | May 17, 2016 |
| "Hey Jealousy" | Gin Blossoms | 1993 | Alternative | Single | May 24, 2016 |
| "Found Out About You" | Gin Blossoms | 1993 | Alternative | Single | May 24, 2016 |
| "We're Not Gonna Take It" | Twisted Sister | 1984 | Glam | Single | May 31, 2016 |
| "Cherry Pie" | Warrant | 1990 | Metal | Single | May 31, 2016 |
| "Hook" | Blues Traveler | 1994 | Rock | Single | Jun 7, 2016 |
| "Famous Last Words" | My Chemical Romance | 2006 | Emo | Single | Jun 7, 2016 |
| "Rude" | Magic! | 2014 | Pop-Rock | Single | Jun 14, 2016 |
| "Iris" | Goo Goo Dolls | 1998 | Alternative | Single | Jun 14, 2016 |
| "Radioactive" | Imagine Dragons | 2012 | Alternative | Single | Jun 21, 2016 |
| "Never Too Late" | Three Days Grace | 2006 | Rock | Single | Jun 21, 2016 |
| "Africa" | Toto | 1982 | Pop-Rock | Single | Jun 28, 2016 |
| "All These Things That I've Done" | The Killers | 2004 | Alternative | Single | Jun 28, 2016 |
| "Lips of an Angel" | Hinder | 2005 | Rock | Single | Jul 5, 2016 |
| "Where Is My Mind?" | Pixies | 1988 | Alternative | Single | Jul 5, 2016 |
| "Rock This Town" | Brian Setzer | 2007 | Rock | Single | Jul 12, 2016 |
| "Jumper" | Third Eye Blind | 1997 | Alternative | Single | Jul 12, 2016 |
| "Uptown Girl" | Billy Joel | 1983 | Classic Rock | Single | Jul 19, 2016 |
| "Hemorrhage (In My Hands)" | Fuel | 2000 | Rock | Single | Jul 19, 2016 |
| "Pompeii" | Bastille | 2013 | Indie Rock | Single | Jul 26, 2016 |
| "I Gotta Feeling" | The Black Eyed Peas | 2009 | Pop/Dance/Electronic | Single | Jul 26, 2016 |
| "Blurred Lines" | Robin Thicke ft. Pharrell | 2013 | R&B/Soul/Funk | Single | Aug 2, 2016 |
| "Mr. Jones" | Counting Crows | 1993 | Alternative | Single | Aug 2, 2016 |
| "Heaven Is a Place on Earth" | Belinda Carlisle | 1987 | Pop-Rock | Single | Aug 9, 2016 |
| "Bad Catholics" (Note: Track was previously only available as part of a special promotion.) | The Barbazons | 2015 | Indie Rock | Single | Aug 9, 2016 |
| "If You Could Only See" | Tonic | 1996 | Alternative | Single | Aug 16, 2016 |
| "Everything You Want" | Vertical Horizon | 1999 | Alternative | Single | Aug 16, 2016 |
| "I'm Yours" | Jason Mraz | 2008 | Pop-Rock | Single | Aug 23, 2016 |
| "Starships" | Nicki Minaj | 2012 | Pop/Dance/Electronic | Single | Aug 23, 2016 |
| "What About Love" | Heart | 1985 | Classic Rock | Single | Aug 30, 2016 |
| "Seventeen" | Winger | 1988 | Glam | Single | Aug 30, 2016 |
| "Wrong Side of Heaven" | Five Finger Death Punch | 2013 | Metal | Single | Sep 6, 2016 |
| "Lifestyles of the Rich and Famous" | Good Charlotte | 2002 | Punk | Single | Sep 6, 2016 |
| "Dirt Road Anthem" | Jason Aldean | 2010 | Country | Single | Sep 13, 2016 |
| "All for You" | Sister Hazel | 1997 | Alternative | Single | Sep 13, 2016 |
| "Dystopia" | Megadeth | 2016 | Metal | Ozzfest meets Knotfest 2016 | Sep 20, 2016 |
| "Road to Nowhere" | Ozzy Osbourne | 1991 | Metal | Ozzfest meets Knotfest 2016 | Sep 20, 2016 |
| "The Devil in I" | Slipknot | 2014 | Nu-Metal | Ozzfest meets Knotfest 2016 | Sep 20, 2016 |
| "HandClap" | Fitz and the Tantrums | 2016 | Pop-Rock | Single | Sep 27, 2016 |
| "The Sound of Silence" | Disturbed | 2015 | Nu-Metal | Single | Sep 27, 2016 |
| "Flagpole Sitta" | Harvey Danger | 1997 | Alternative | Single | Oct 4, 2016 |
| "Stop" | Jane's Addiction | 1990 | Alternative | Single | Oct 4, 2016 |
| "Honey, I'm Good." | Andy Grammer | 2014 | Pop-Rock | Single | Oct 11, 2016 |
| "Treat You Better" | Shawn Mendes | 2016 | Pop-Rock | Single | Oct 11, 2016 |
| "Happy Song" | Bring Me the Horizon | 2015 | Nu-Metal | Rock Band Rivals Launch Pack | Oct 18, 2016 |
| "Safe and Sound" | Capital Cities | 2013 | Pop/Dance/Electronic | Rock Band Rivals Launch Pack | Oct 18, 2016 |
| "Save Tonight" | Eagle-Eye Cherry | 1997 | Alternative | Rock Band Rivals Launch Pack | Oct 18, 2016 |
| "Happy" | Pharrell Williams | 2014 | Pop/Dance/Electronic | Rock Band Rivals Launch Pack | Oct 18, 2016 |
| "Sweater Weather" | The Neighbourhood | 2013 | Indie Rock | Rock Band Rivals Launch Pack | Oct 18, 2016 |
| "Little Talks" | Of Monsters and Men | 2011 | Indie Rock | Rock Band Rivals Launch Pack | Oct 18, 2016 |
| "Closing Time" | Semisonic | 1998 | Alternative | Rock Band Rivals Launch Pack | Oct 18, 2016 |
| "Chandelier" | Sia | 2014 | Pop/Dance/Electronic | Rock Band Rivals Launch Pack | Oct 18, 2016 |
| "Feel Invincible" | Skillet | 2016 | Rock | Rock Band Rivals Launch Pack | Oct 18, 2016 |
| "King of the World" | Weezer | 2016 | Alternative | Rock Band Rivals Launch Pack | Oct 18, 2016 |
| "One More Night" | Maroon 5 | 2012 | Pop-Rock | Single | Oct 25, 2016 |
| "3AM" | Matchbox Twenty | 1996 | Alternative | Single | Oct 25, 2016 |
| "Closer" | The Chainsmokers ft. Halsey | 2016 | Pop/Dance/Electronic | Single | Oct 27, 2016 |
| "Cheap Thrills" | Sia ft. Sean Paul | 2016 | Pop/Dance/Electronic | Single | Oct 27, 2016 |
| "Hold My Hand" | Hootie & the Blowfish | 1994 | Alternative | Hootie & the Blowfish 01 | Nov 1, 2016 |
| "Only Wanna Be with You" | Hootie & the Blowfish | 1994 | Alternative | Hootie & the Blowfish 01 | Nov 1, 2016 |
| "Let Her Cry" | Hootie & the Blowfish | 1994 | Alternative | Hootie & the Blowfish 01 | Nov 1, 2016 |
| "Born Again Tomorrow" | Bon Jovi | 2016 | Rock | Single | Nov 3, 2016 |
| "Lovesong" | The Cure | 1989 | New Wave | Single | Nov 10, 2016 |
| "Time After Time" | Cyndi Lauper | 1983 | Pop-Rock | Single | Nov 10, 2016 |
| "She Drives Me Crazy" | Fine Young Cannibals | 1989 | New Wave | Single | Nov 10, 2016 |
| "Complicated" | Avril Lavigne | 2002 | Pop-Rock | Avril Lavigne 01 | Nov 17, 2016 |
| "My Happy Ending" | Avril Lavigne | 2004 | Pop-Rock | Avril Lavigne 01 | Nov 17, 2016 |
| "What the Hell" | Avril Lavigne | 2011 | Pop-Rock | Avril Lavigne 01 | Nov 17, 2016 |
| "24K Magic" | Bruno Mars | 2016 | Pop-Rock | Single | Nov 22, 2016 |
| "Hymn for the Weekend" | Coldplay | 2016 | Alternative | Single | Nov 22, 2016 |
| "Still Breathing" | Green Day | 2016 | Rock | Single | Nov 22, 2016 |
| "Starboy" | The Weeknd ft. Daft Punk | 2016 | Pop/Dance/Electronic | Single | Dec 1, 2016 |
| "Waste a Moment" | Kings of Leon | 2016 | Rock | Single | Dec 1, 2016 |
| "Chop Suey!" | System of a Down | 2001 | Nu-Metal | Single | Dec 1, 2016 |
| "Heathens" | Twenty One Pilots | 2016 | Alternative | Twenty One Pilots 01 | Dec 8, 2016 |
| "Ride" | Twenty One Pilots | 2015 | Alternative | Twenty One Pilots 01 | Dec 8, 2016 |
| "Shadow" (Note: Song is available at no cost.) (Note: Song is exclusively available through the December update to Rock Band Rivals.) | Bearstronaut | 2016 | Pop-Rock | Single | Dec 14, 2016 |
| "Bethany" | Goddamn Draculas | 2015 | Rock | Single | Dec 14, 2016 |
| "Black Streak" | Nemes | 2014 | Indie Rock | Single | Dec 14, 2016 |
| "I Recognize" | Newfane | 2016 | Alternative | Single | Dec 14, 2016 |
| "Never Let 'Em Hold Ya Back!" | Parlour Bells | 2016 | Glam | Single | Dec 14, 2016 |
| "True Confessional" | Party Bois | 2016 | Pop/Dance/Electronic | Single | Dec 14, 2016 |
| "Mean Girls" | Petty Morals | 2016 | Pop-Rock | Single | Dec 14, 2016 |
| "Hour of Rats" | The Red Chord | 2009 | Metal | Single | Dec 14, 2016 |
| "Pain Killer" | Ruby Rose Fox | 2016 | Indie Rock | Single | Dec 14, 2016 |
| "Closer, Closer" | The Warning Shots | 2016 | Punk | Single | Dec 14, 2016 |
| "Constant Disaster" | When Particles Collide | 2014 | Alternative | Single | Dec 14, 2016 |
| "Black Corridor" | Worshipper | 2016 | Metal | Single | Dec 14, 2016 |
| "Royals" | Lorde | 2013 | Pop/Dance/Electronic | Off the Charts 05 | Dec 15, 2016 |
| "All About That Bass" | Meghan Trainor | 2014 | Pop/Dance/Electronic | Off the Charts 05 | Dec 15, 2016 |
| "The Greatest" | Sia ft. Kendrick Lamar | 2016 | Pop/Dance/Electronic | Off the Charts 05 | Dec 15, 2016 |
| "Angel" | Aerosmith | 1987 | Rock | Aerosmith Hits 03 | Dec 22, 2016 |
| "Crazy" | Aerosmith | 1993 | Rock | Aerosmith Hits 03 | Dec 22, 2016 |
| "I Don't Want to Miss a Thing" | Aerosmith | 1998 | Rock | Aerosmith Hits 03 | Dec 22, 2016 |
| "Janie's Got a Gun" | Aerosmith | 1989 | Rock | Aerosmith Hits 03 | Dec 22, 2016 |
| "Livin' on the Edge" | Aerosmith | 1993 | Rock | Aerosmith Hits 03 | Dec 22, 2016 |
| "Rag Doll" | Aerosmith | 1987 | Rock | Aerosmith Hits 03 | Dec 22, 2016 |
| "Wake Me Up" | Avicii | 2013 | Pop/Dance/Electronic | New Year's Eve 2016 | Dec 29, 2016 |
| "Celebration" | Kool & the Gang | 1980 | R&B/Soul/Funk | New Year's Eve 2016 | Dec 29, 2016 |
| "Party Rock Anthem" | LMFAO ft. Lauren Bennett & GoonRock | 2011 | Pop/Dance/Electronic | New Year's Eve 2016 | Dec 29, 2016 |
