= The Light (Disturbed song) =

Single by Disturbed

from the album Immortalized
- Released: October 5, 2015
- Genre: Alternative metal; heavy metal
- Length: 4:16
- Label: Reprise
- Songwriters: Kevin Churko; Dan Donegan; Mike Wengren; David Draiman
- Producer: Kevin Churko

Disturbed singles chronology
"Immortalized" (2015)	"The Light" (2015)	"The Sound of Silence" (2015)

Music video
- "The Light" on YouTube

"The Light" is a song by American heavy metal band Disturbed, from their sixth album, Immortalized. It was released as a single on October 5, 2015. Upon its release, the song was noted by many critics for its uplifting lyrics, unusual within the band's discography.

== Track listing ==
Digital download single
No.	Title	Length
1.	"The Light"	4:16
Total length:		4:16

== Music video ==
Directors Culley Bunker and Craig Bernard were tapped to direct the video, which features the band performing in front of a burning building, intercut with a sort of a mini-movie about a firefighter who is disfigured in a fire, but then manages to find love with his rehabilitation nurse. The video was published to YouTube on November 20, 2015, and has over 98 million views as of early March 2025.

== Personnel ==
- David Draiman – lead vocals, backing vocals
- Dan Donegan – guitars, keyboards, backing vocals
- John Moyer - bass, backing vocals
- Mike Wengren – drums, percussion, backing vocals

== Charts ==
=== Weekly charts ===
Chart (2015–16)	Peak position
Canada Rock (Billboard)	29
US Hot Rock & Alternative Songs (Billboard)	18
US Rock & Alternative Airplay (Billboard)	10

=== Year-end charts ===
Chart (2016)	Position
US Hot Rock Songs (Billboard)	58
US Rock Airplay (Billboard)	44

== Certifications ==
Region	Certification	Certified units/sales
Australia (ARIA)	Gold	35,000^{‡}
Canada (Music Canada)	Gold	40,000^{‡}
United States (RIAA)	Platinum	1,000,000^{‡}
^{‡} Sales+streaming figures based on certification alone.
