= Open Your Eyes (Disturbed song) =

2016 single by Disturbed

Single by Disturbed

from the album Immortalized
- Released: July 19, 2016
- Genre: Alternative metal
- Length: 3:57
- Label: Reprise
- Songwriters: David Draiman; Dan Donegan; Mike Wengren; Kevin Churko; John Feldmann; Nicholas Furlong
- Producer: Churko

Disturbed singles chronology
"The Sound of Silence" (2015)	"Open Your Eyes" (2016)	"Are You Ready" (2018)

"Open Your Eyes" is a song by American heavy metal band Disturbed. It is the fourth single and fourth track from their sixth album Immortalized. It reached No. 1 on the Billboard Mainstream Rock Airplay chart in November 2016.

== Background ==
In a 2016 interview, singer David Draiman said that the song deals with being overwhelmed by conflicting information in modern life and encourages listeners to look past what is put in front of them to find the truth.

== Composition ==
Irving (Emeritus), writing for Sputnikmusic, noted that producer Kevin Churko's role in the band's musical reorientation is particularly evident on the album's early songs, including "Open Your Eyes" as a straightforward rocker that moves at a "satisfying, bone-crunching pace".

== Critical reception ==
Jon Hadusek of Consequence said the song was "painfully dated", described its staccato riffs as limp, and noted that it sounds familiar to Disturbed fans. Alex Sievers of The Music said it was "numbingly dull" and didn't go anywhere.

Tim Byron of The Sydney Morning Herald said the track shows why the band is popular, with Draiman sounding like James Hetfield of Metallica, riffs like Linkin Park-style nu metal, and a chorus like Bon Jovi's "Livin' on a Prayer", calling it a catchy mix of different metal styles.

=== Reception ===
The song took part in a Loudwire Cage Match against Ghost's "From the Pinnacle to the Pit" and got 34% of the fan votes.

== Lyric video ==
The band released a lyric video on August 31, 2016. It shows a young man becoming more absorbed in his phone while the world around him grows darker and passes him by, reflecting the song's message about looking beyond what comes through screens.

== Chart performance ==
It reached No. 1 on the Billboard Mainstream Rock Airplay chart on November 26, 2016, their seventh song to do so.

== Personnel ==
Credits adapted from Apple Music.

Disturbed

- David Draiman - lead vocals, background vocals, songwriter
- Dan Donegan - keyboards, background vocals, electric guitar, bass guitar, songwriter
- Mike Wengren - drums, percussion, background vocals, songwriter

Additional credits

- Kevin Churko - songwriter, producer, mixing engineer, recording engineer
- John Feldmann - songwriter
- Nicholas Furlong - songwriter

== Charts ==
=== Weekly charts ===
Weekly chart performance for "Open Your Eyes"
Chart (2016)	Peak position
US Hot Rock & Alternative Songs (Billboard)	32
US Rock & Alternative Airplay (Billboard)	12
US Mainstream Rock Airplay (Billboard)	1

=== Year-end charts ===
Year-end chart performance for "Open Your Eyes"
Chart (2016)	Position
US Mainstream Rock Airplay (Billboard)	24
