= Built to Last (HammerFall album) =

Studio album by HammerFall
- Released: 4 November 2016
- Recorded: 2016, Castle Black Studios, Gothenburg, Sweden, and Bohus Studios Kungälv, Sweden
- Genre: Power metal, heavy metal
- Length: 47:20
- Label: Napalm
- Producer: James Michael, Oscar Dronjak, Pontus Norgren

HammerFall chronology
(r)Evolution (2014)	Built to Last (2016)	Dominion (2019)

Singles from Built to Last
- 1. "The Sacred Vow" Released: 25 August 2016

Professional ratings
Review scores
Source	Rating
Aftonbladet	3/5 stars
Blabbermouth.net	7.5/10
Cutting Edge	3/5 stars
Göteborgs-Posten	3/5 stars
laut.de	2/5 stars
Metal Hammer Germany	6/7
Metal Hammer UK	4/5 stars
Powermetal.de	8/10
Rock Hard	8.5/10
Soundi	2/5 stars

Built to Last is the tenth studio album by Swedish power metal band HammerFall, released on 4 November 2016. It is the first album to feature David Wallin on drums.

== Track listing ==
No.	Title	Writer(s)	Length
1.	"Bring It!"	Oscar Dronjak, Joacim Cans	4:18
2.	"Hammer High"	Dronjak, Cans	4:37
3.	"The Sacred Vow"	Dronjak, Cans	4:11
4.	"Dethrone and Defy"	Dronjak, Cans	5:10
5.	"Twilight Princess"	Dronjak	5:03
6.	"Stormbreaker"	Dronjak, Cans	4:51
7.	"Built to Last"	Dronjak, Cans	3:52
8.	"The Star of Home"	Dronjak, Cans, Pontus Norgren	4:47
9.	"New Breed"	Dronjak, Cans	5:02
10.	"Second to None"	Dronjak, Cans	5:29
Total length:			47:20

== Personnel ==
- Joacim Cans – vocals
- Oscar Dronjak – guitars
- Pontus Norgren – guitars
- Fredrik Larsson – bass
- David Wallin – drums

== Charts ==
Chart (2016)	Peak position
Austrian Albums (Ö3 Austria)	19
Belgian Albums (Ultratop Flanders)	96
Belgian Albums (Ultratop Wallonia)	54
German Albums (Offizielle Top 100)	8
Hungarian Albums (MAHASZ)	28
Swedish Albums (Sverigetopplistan)	6
Swiss Albums (Schweizer Hitparade)	15
