= (r)Evolution =

Studio album by HammerFall
- Released: 27 August 2014
- Recorded: Red Level 3 Studios Nashville, U.S. Studio Fredman, Gothenburg, Sweden; Castle Black Studios, Harryda, Sweden
- Genre: Power metal, heavy metal
- Length: 49:15
- Label: Nuclear Blast
- Producer: James Michael, Oscar Dronjak, Pontus Norgren, Fredrik Nordström

HammerFall chronology
Infected (2011)	(r)Evolution (2014)	Built to Last (2016)

(r)Evolution is the ninth studio album by Swedish power metal band HammerFall. It was released on 27 August 2014 in Sweden, 29 August in mainland Europe, 1 September in the UK, and 2 September in North America. For the first time since 1998, HammerFall collaborated with Fredrik Nordström on a studio album, and Fredrik is sharing production credits with guitarists Oscar Dronjak and Pontus Norgren. It is also the band's final album to feature drummer Anders Johansson before his departure in September 2014. On 4 September 2014 (r)Evolution went all the way to No. 1 on Sverigetopplistan (Swedish Charts).

== Track listing ==
No.	Title	Writer(s)	Length
1.	"Hector's Hymn"	Oscar Dronjak, Joacim Cans	5:52
2.	"(r)Evolution"	Dronjak, Cans	4:23
3.	"Bushido"	Dronjak, Cans, Norgren	4:39
4.	"Live Life Loud"	Dronjak, Cans	3:30
5.	"Ex Inferis"	Dronjak, Cans	4:39
6.	"We Won't Back Down"	Dronjak, Cans	4:17
7.	"Winter Is Coming"	Dronjak	3:47
8.	"Origins"	Dronjak, Cans	4:56
9.	"Tainted Metal"	Cans, Norgren	4:35
10.	"Evil Incarnate"	Dronjak, Cans	4:34
11.	"Wildfire"	Dronjak, Cans, Norgren	4:03
Total length:			49:15

Limited edition bonus track
No.	Title	Writer(s)	Length
12.	"Demonized"	Dronjak, Cans	3:36
Total length:			52:51

== Personnel ==
- Joacim Cans – lead and backing vocals
- Oscar Dronjak – guitars, keyboards, backing vocals
- Pontus Norgren – guitars, backing vocals
- Fredrik Larsson – bass, backing vocals
- Anders Johansson – drums
- James Michael – vocals on track 6
- Mats Leven – backing vocals

=== Production ===
- Oscar Dronjak – production
- Pontus Norgren – production
- Fredrik Nordström – production
- James Michael – production

== Charts ==
Chart (2014)	Peak position
Austrian Albums (Ö3 Austria)	13
Belgian Albums (Ultratop Flanders)	90
Belgian Albums (Ultratop Wallonia)	71
Czech Republic	4
Finnish Albums (Suomen virallinen lista)	10
French Albums (SNEP)	85
German Albums (Offizielle Top 100)	4
Hungarian Albums (MAHASZ)	15
Scottish Albums (OCC)	85
Swedish Albums (Sverigetopplistan)	1
Swiss Albums (Schweizer Hitparade)	5
UK Independent Albums (OCC)	21
UK Rock & Metal Albums (OCC)	10
