= Dominion (HammerFall album) =

Studio album by HammerFall
- Released: 16 August 2019
- Genre: Power metal, heavy metal
- Length: 50:29
- Label: Napalm
- Producer: James Michael, Oscar Dronjak, Pontus Norgren

HammerFall chronology
| Built to Last (2016) | Dominion (2019) | Hammer of Dawn (2022) |

Singles from Dominion
- 1. "(We Make) Sweden Rock" Released: 3 May 2019; 2. "Second to One" Released: 3 January 2020

Dominion is the eleventh studio album by Swedish power metal band HammerFall, released on 16 August 2019. The first single, "(We Make) Sweden Rock", was released on 3 May. The song is a tribute to Swedish hard rock and heavy metal bands. It is the second album to feature David Wallin on drums, and the first since his departure and subsequent rejoining in 2016.

== Track listing ==
| No. | Title | Writer(s) | Length |
|---|---|---|---|
| 1. | "Never Forgive, Never Forget" | Oscar Dronjak, Joacim Cans | 5:31 |
| 2. | "Dominion" | Dronjak, Cans | 4:39 |
| 3. | "Testify" | Dronjak, Cans | 4:29 |
| 4. | "One Against the World" | Dronjak, Cans | 3:53 |
| 5. | "(We Make) Sweden Rock" | Dronjak, Cans | 4:15 |
| 6. | "Second to One" | Dronjak, Cans, James Michael | 4:10 |
| 7. | "Scars of a Generation" | Dronjak, Cans | 4:41 |
| 8. | "Dead by Dawn" | Cans, Norgren | 3:59 |
| 9. | "Battleworn" | Dronjak, Cans | 0:38 |
| 10. | "Bloodline" | Dronjak, Cans | 4:46 |
| 11. | "Chain of Command" | Dronjak, Cans | 4:00 |
| 12. | "And Yet I Smile" | Dronjak, Cans | 5:28 |
| Total length: | | | 50:29 |

Japanese edition bonus track
| No. | Title | Writer(s) | Length |
|---|---|---|---|
| 13. | "You Win or You Die" | Dronjak, Cans | 4:15 |
| Total length: | | | 54:44 |

== Personnel ==
- Joacim Cans – vocals
- Oscar Dronjak – guitars
- Pontus Norgren – guitars
- Fredrik Larsson – bass
- David Wallin – drums

=== Guests ===
- Noora Louhimo (Battle Beast) – guest vocals on "Second to One" (single edition)

== Charts ==
| Chart (2019) | Peak position |
|---|---|
| Austrian Albums (Ö3 Austria) | 11 |
| Belgian Albums (Ultratop Flanders) | 48 |
| Belgian Albums (Ultratop Wallonia) | 36 |
| Czech Albums (ČNS IFPI) | 59 |
| Finnish Albums (Suomen virallinen lista) | 48 |
| French Albums (SNEP) | 126 |
| German Albums (Offizielle Top 100) | 4 |
| Hungarian Albums (MAHASZ) | 25 |
| Polish Albums (ZPAV) | 36 |
| Scottish Albums (OCC) | 51 |
| Spanish Albums (PROMUSICAE) | 81 |
| Swedish Albums (Sverigetopplistan) | 2 |
| Swiss Albums (Schweizer Hitparade) | 2 |
