= The Vengeful One =

Single by Disturbed

from the album Immortalized
- Released: June 23, 2015
- Genre: Heavy metal
- Length: 4:11
- Label: Reprise
- Songwriters: Kevin Churko; Dan Donegan; Mike Wengren; David Draiman
- Producer: Kevin Churko

Disturbed singles chronology
"Hell" (2011)	"The Vengeful One" (2015)	"Immortalized" (2015)

Music video
- "The Vengeful One" on YouTube

"The Vengeful One" is a song by heavy metal band Disturbed, from their sixth album, Immortalized. It was released on June 23, 2015, and is the band's first released song in 4 years, since the release of The Lost Children. The song is featured as the background music in the opening for Ferrall on the Bench, Scott Ferrall's CBS Sports Radio show.

== Accolades ==
Region	Year	Publication	Accolade	Rank
United States	2015	Loudwire	20 Best Rock Songs of 2015	8
United States	2015	Loudwire	10 Best Rock Videos of 2015	2

Loudwire Music Awards

Year	Nominee / work	Award	Result
2015	The Vengeful One	Best Rock Song	Nominated
2015	The Vengeful One	Best Rock Video	Nominated

== Track listing ==
Compact disc single
No.	Title	Length
1.	"The Vengeful One"	4:11
2.	"Immortalized"	4:17
3.	"The Vengeful One" (Instrumental)	4:11
4.	"Immortalized" (Instrumental)	4:17
Total length:		16:55

Digital download single
No.	Title	Length
1.	"The Vengeful One"	4:11
Total length:		4:11

== Music video ==
The animated, rotoscoping-heavy music video was directed by Phil Mucci and released on YouTube on June 23. It features the band's mascot The Guy, as "The Vengeful One" and "The Dark Messiah" embarking on a destructive crusade against hyperbolic representations of corruption and cultural toxicity in modern news media.

The video opens with The Guy monitoring television broadcasts from a void in deep space. Television screens depict war and destruction and flash the words like "HATE", "FEAR", and "OBEY"; while news broadcasts show combined line and bar graphs with the words "DEATH TOLL / STOCKS SOAR" and "POVERTY / PROFITS" delivered by cheery anchors. Fed up with what he sees, The Guy embarks toward the source of the violent broadcasts to stop them, discovering a towering building on the edge of a city labeled Global Warfare Manufacturing. The building is surrounded by ruins and vehicles in a desert, with decaying ships indicating the presence of a dried-up ocean. Inside, the news anchors are revealed to be robotic puppets, all media is controlled by a single businessman, and broadcast from a central location. The Guy destroys all the robotic anchors and proceeds to the Master Control room where he finds feral demonic workers cannibalizing an intern named Hope. The Guy kills the demonic workers, with the final demonic businessman being thrown out a window into a passing helicopter. Over the course of the video, a family is depicted watching television news and violent cartoons and changing into the same feral demons that were in the master control room. The Guy removes the large spherical camera rig from the center of the room and throws it into the sun, and destroys Global Warfare MFG's satellites as he departs. With the violent broadcasts stopped, the family returns to human form and appears to be at peace once again.

== Personnel ==
Disturbed

- Dan Donegan – lead and rhythm guitar, bass guitar, EBow, keyboards, backing vocals
- David Draiman – lead and backing vocals
- Mike Wengren – drums, percussion, backing vocals

Production

- Kevin Churko – engineer, mixing, producer
- Samantha Maloney – orchestral arrangement

== Charts ==
=== Weekly charts ===
Chart (2015)	Peak position
Canada Rock (Billboard)	35
US Hot Rock & Alternative Songs (Billboard)	17
US Rock & Alternative Airplay (Billboard)	10

=== Year-end charts ===
Chart (2015)	Position
US Hot Rock Songs (Billboard)	45
US Rock Airplay (Billboard)	43

== Certifications ==
Region	Certification	Certified units/sales
Australia (ARIA)	Gold	35,000^{‡}
Canada (Music Canada)	Platinum	80,000^{‡}
New Zealand (RMNZ)	Gold	15,000^{‡}
Poland (ZPAV)	Gold	25,000^{‡}
United States (RIAA)	Platinum	1,000,000^{‡}
^{‡} Sales+streaming figures based on certification alone.

== In popular culture ==
The Vengeful One was released as a downloadable content for the video game, Rock Band 4, on January 12, 2016.
