= Kıraç (singer) =

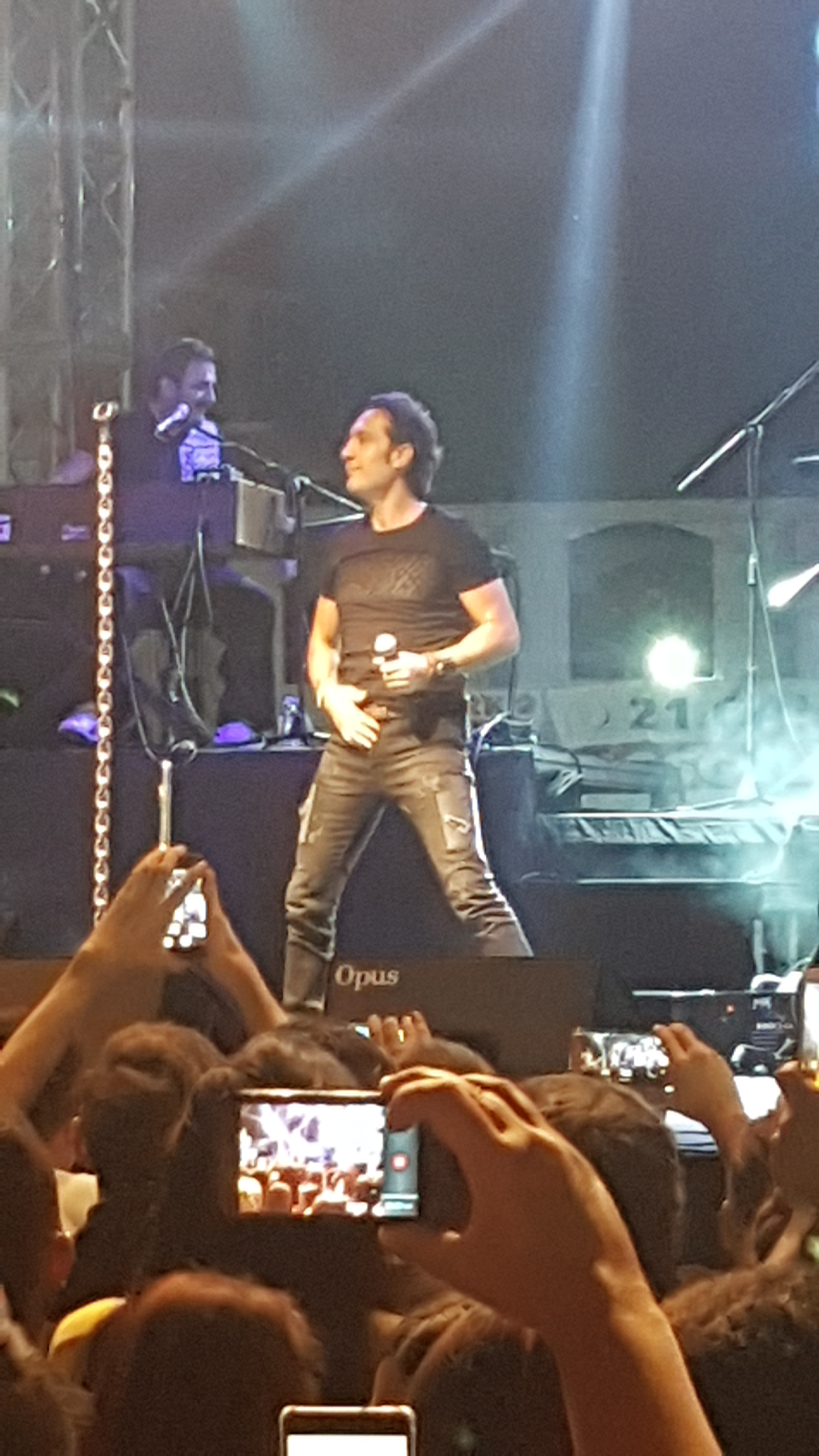
- Kıraç In concert

Background information
- Also known as: Kıraç
- Born: Ali Tufan Kıraç; 17 June 1972 (age 54); Göksun, Kahramanmaraş, Turkey
- Genres: Anatolian rock Heavy Metal; Hard rock
- Occupations: Singer-songwriter, musician
- Instruments: Vocals, guitar, electric guitar, cura, bağlama
- Years active: 1998–present
- Label: TMC
- Website: kirac.net

Ali Tufan Kıraç (born 17 June 1972) is a Turkish anatolian rock and heavy metal musician.

As a son of a teacher, he began his elementary studies in his birthplace of Göksun. He completed his primary and secondary education in Hasköy, Istanbul. After he completed his high school education, he joined Marmara University, Atatürk Faculty of Music Education.

Namık Nağdaliyev, the guitarist in Kıraç's backing band, is well known for his work with the pioneering Azerbaijani hard rock band Yukhu in the 1990s.

== Discography ==
=== Albums ===
- 1998: Deli Düş
- 2000: Bir Garip Aşk Bestesi
- 2001: Sevgiliye
- 2001: Zaman
- 2003: Kayıp Şehir
- 2007: Benim Yolum
- 2008: Kıraç Toprağın Türküleri
- 2009: Garbiyeli
- 2009: Rock Dünyasından Sesleniş
- 2009: Yolcu
- 2011: Derindekiler
- 2014: Çık Hayatımdan

=== Singles ===
- 2008: Haydi Haydi
- 2010: Show Zamanı
- 2011: Dön Artık
- 2013: Beddua
- 2016: Yolun Sonu
- 2016: Senden Sonra
- 2017: Kerkük Zindanı
- 2018: Benim Halkım
- 2020: Hayat
- 2021: Vatan Marşı
- 2021: Gel Sevdiğim
- 2021: Melekler Ağlar
- 2021: Aşk Yasak mı?
- 2021: Çemberimde Gül Oya (with Bertuğ Cemil and Su Soley)
- 2021: Haydi

=== Compilations ===
- 2019: Beni Ben Yapan Şarkılar

== Personal life ==
Kıraç married actor Ayşe Şule Bilgiç in 2008. The couple had two children, named Elif Iraz and Çağrı Manas.

== Soundtracks of TV series ==
Kıraç has prepared the soundtracks of a number of TV series, including Zerda, Aliye, Unutulmaz, Binbir Gece and Beyaz Gelincik, Bir İstanbul Masalı and Kaçak.
