= Infected (HammerFall album) =

Studio album by HammerFall
- Released: 18 May 2011 (Sweden); 20 May 2011 (Europe); 7 June 2011 (North America)
- Recorded: 2010–2011, Red Level 3 Studios Nashville, ⌘-s Studios, Gothenburg, Sweden; Bohus Studios Kungälv, Sweden
- Genre: Power metal, heavy metal
- Length: 51:18
- Label: Nuclear Blast
- Producer: James Michael, Oscar Dronjak, Pontus Norgren

HammerFall chronology
No Sacrifice, No Victory (2009)	Infected (2011)	(r)Evolution (2014)

Professional ratings
Review scores
Source	Rating
Suite101	2.5/5 stars
AllMusic	4/5 stars

Infected is the eighth studio album by Swedish power metal band HammerFall, released on 20 May 2011 in Europe and 7 June 2011 in North America. It was their first album produced by James Michael and the HammerFall guitarists Oscar Dronjak and Pontus Norgren. To promote the record, the song "One More Time" was released as the first official single on 6 April 2011. On 8 April 2011, Nuclear Blast Records released a limited edition picture 7" version of the single "One More Time"; the vinyl was limited to 500 copies. The album entered the Swedish charts at number two.

The album's second single, "Send Me a Sign", was released on 6 May 2011 with two tracks: "Send Me a Sign" and "Send Me a Sign (Instrumental)". The album's third single "B.Y.H" was released on 23 August 2011 and it had two tracks: "B.Y.H." and "Hol van a szó (Send Me a Sign - Hungarian Version)".

== Album cover disputes ==
After considering potential legal actions and possible negative reception, the original album cover of a black biological hazard symbol on a grey background was changed to the existing bloody hand. Band mascot Hector had been featured prominently on each album cover up to this point, and many fans saw his exclusion from this album as a sign that HammerFall were possibly moving away from their traditional power metal sound. Hector does, however, appear on the "Send Me a Sign" single, and artist Samwise Didier even provides backup vocals on the main album, indicating that fans had likely not seen the last of the chivalrous mascot. Bassist Fredrik Larsson confirmed in a live chat on the official Nuclear Blast Records website that it was indeed not the end of Hector, and he would be featured on future records and merchandise. Hector returned to grace the cover of the band's next album.

== Track listing ==
No.	Title	Writer(s)	Length
1.	"Patient Zero"	Dronjak, Cans	6:01
2.	"B.Y.H."	Dronjak, Cans	3:47
3.	"One More Time"	Dronjak, Cans	4:07
4.	"The Outlaw"	Cans, Norgren	4:10
5.	"Send Me a Sign" (Pokolgép cover)	Kukovecz Gábor, Tarca László	4:00
6.	"Dia De Los Muertos"	Dronjak, Cans, Larsson	5:07
7.	"I Refuse"	Dronjak, Cans	4:32
8.	"666 - The Enemy Within"	Dronjak, Cans	4:28
9.	"Immortalized"	Dronjak, Cans	3:59
10.	"Let's Get It On"	Dronjak	4:05
11.	"Redemption"	Dronjak, Cans	7:02
Total length:			51:18

== Personnel ==
- Joacim Cans – lead and backing vocals
- Oscar Dronjak – rhythm, lead guitars, keyboards and backing vocals, production
- Pontus Norgren – rhythm, lead guitars and backing vocals, production
- Fredrik Larsson – bass guitar and backing vocals
- Anders Johansson – drums
- James Michael – production

=== Additional musicians ===
- James Michael – piano, clavinet, zombie breathing, male voice on track 10
- Shanaz – female voice on track 1
- Sam Didier – additional backing vocals

== Charts ==
=== Weekly charts ===
Chart (2011)	Peak position
Austrian Albums (Ö3 Austria)	17
Belgian Albums (Ultratop Wallonia)	95
Finnish Albums (Suomen virallinen lista)	44
German Albums (Offizielle Top 100)	9
Swedish Albums (Sverigetopplistan)	2
Swiss Albums (Schweizer Hitparade)	21

=== Year-end charts ===
Chart (2011)	Position
Swedish Albums (Sverigetopplistan)	90
