= Pontus Norgren =

Swedish guitarist

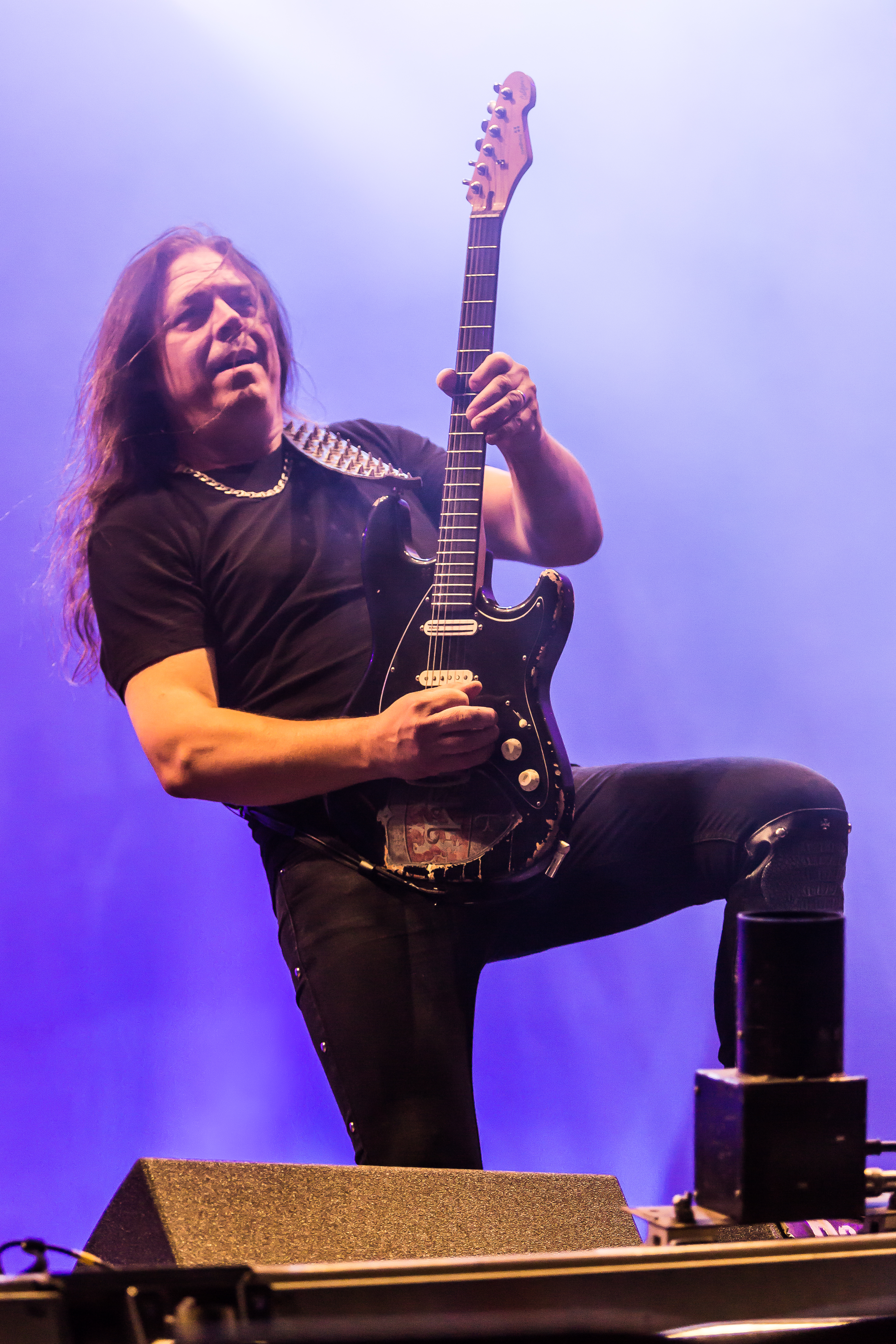
- Norgren performing in 2018

Background information
- Born: Karl Pontus Norgren; 22 April 1968 (age 57)
- Genres: Heavy metal, power metal
- Occupations: Musician, record producer, songwriter
- Instrument: Guitar
- Website: pontusnorgren.com

Karl Pontus Norgren (born 22 April 1968) is a Swedish musician who has been the lead guitarist of the power metal band HammerFall since 2008. He previously also played with the hard rock band The Poodles, among others.

== Biography ==
Norgren replaced former HammerFall guitarist Stefan Elmgren, who decided to focus on his career as a pilot. Norgren was contacted by Joacim Cans, HammerFall's singer, who asked him if he knew a good guitarist. Being a fan of HammerFall's music and desiring to play a heavier style of music than that of The Poodles (his previous band), Norgren suggested himself. HammerFall asserts that they are happy with Norgren as a guitarist and band member.

Norgren previously also played with Great King Rat, Talisman, Humanimal, The Ring, and Zan Clan. He also served as live sound engineer for Thin Lizzy during the band's 2000 tour, similarly serving Europe and Yngwie J. Malmsteen.

Recently, he joined The German Panzer as one of the group's second guitarists.

== Discography ==
=== Great King Rat ===
- Great King Rat (1992)
- Out of the Can (1999)

=== Jekyll-and-Hyde ===
- Heavenly Creatures (1998)

=== Talisman ===
- Truth (1998)
- "Crazy" (1998) CD single from Truth
- Live at Sweden Rock Festival (2001)

=== Solo ===
- Damage Done (2000)

=== Humanimal ===
- Find My Way Home EP (2002)
- Humanimal (2002)

=== Jeff Scott Soto ===
- Holding On EP (2002)
- Live at The Gods 2.002 (2003)

=== The Ring ===
- Tales from Midgard (2004)

=== DivineFire ===
- Glory Thy Name (2004)

=== Zan Clan ===
- We Are Zan Clan...Who the F**K Are You??! (2005)

=== The Poodles ===
- Metal Will Stand Tall (2006)
- Sweet Trade (2007)
- "Night of Passion" (2006)
- "Metal Will Stand Tall" feat. Tess Merkel (2006)
- "Song for You" (2006)
- "Seven Seas" feat. Peter Stormare (2007)
- "Line of Fire" feat. E-Type (2008)
- "Raise the Banner" (2008) Sweden's official song for the 2008 Beijing Olympic Games

=== Doogie White ===
- As Yet Untitled (2008)

=== HammerFall ===
- No Sacrifice, No Victory (2009)
- Infected (2011)
- (r)Evolution (2014)
- Built to Last (2016)
- Dominion (2019)
- Hammer of Dawn (2022)

=== Guest musician ===
- Various Artists – Musically Correct III: The Eagle Has Landed (1999) "Brand New Start" from Damage Done
- House of Shakira – III (2000) guitar solo on "In Your Head"
- Locomotive Breath – Heavy Machinery (2002) guitar solo on "The Adventures of Zaphod Beeblebrox"
- Various Artists – United: Where Is the Fire (2005) DVD
- Talisman – 7 (2007) guest guitarist on "Final Curtain"
- Tomas Bergsten's Fantasy – Nightwalker (2015) guitar solo on "In Eternity"

== As producer, engineer, mixer ==
- Human Clay – U4Ia (1997)
- Four Sticks – Electric Celebration (1997) engineer, mixing
- House of Shakira – Lint (1997) mixing (with Björn Wallmark)
- House of Shakira – On the Verge (1998) mixing (with Björn Wallmark)
- Southpaw – Southpaw (1998)
- Clockwise – Naîve (1998) engineer (with Niklas Sjöberg)
- Jekyll-and-Hyde – Heavenly Creatures (1998) engineer
- Great King Rat – Out of the Can (1999) producer, mixing
- Gaeleri – Still Here... (1999) co-producer, engineer
- Pontus Norgren – Damage Done (2000) producer
- House of Shakira – III (2000) engineer, mixing
- House of Shakira – Live +(2001) live sound engineer
- Humanimal – Find My Way Home EP (2002) co-producer, engineer
- Humanimal – Humanimal (2002) co-producer, engineer
- Mercury Fang – Liquid Sunshine (2003) producer, mixing
- The Ring – Tales from Midgard (2004) producer, engineer, mixing, mastering
- Candlemass – Candlemass (2005) producer, engineer, mixing
- Doogie White – As Yet Untitled (2008) producer, mixing
- Last Autumn's Dream – Hunting Shadows (2008) mixing, mastering
- Impulsia – Expressions (2009) co-producer, engineer
- Rough Diamond – Stories from the Old Days (2012) mixing (with Marcus Jidell)
- Dreamcatcher – No More (2020) writer
