= Matt Mahurin =

American director and photographer

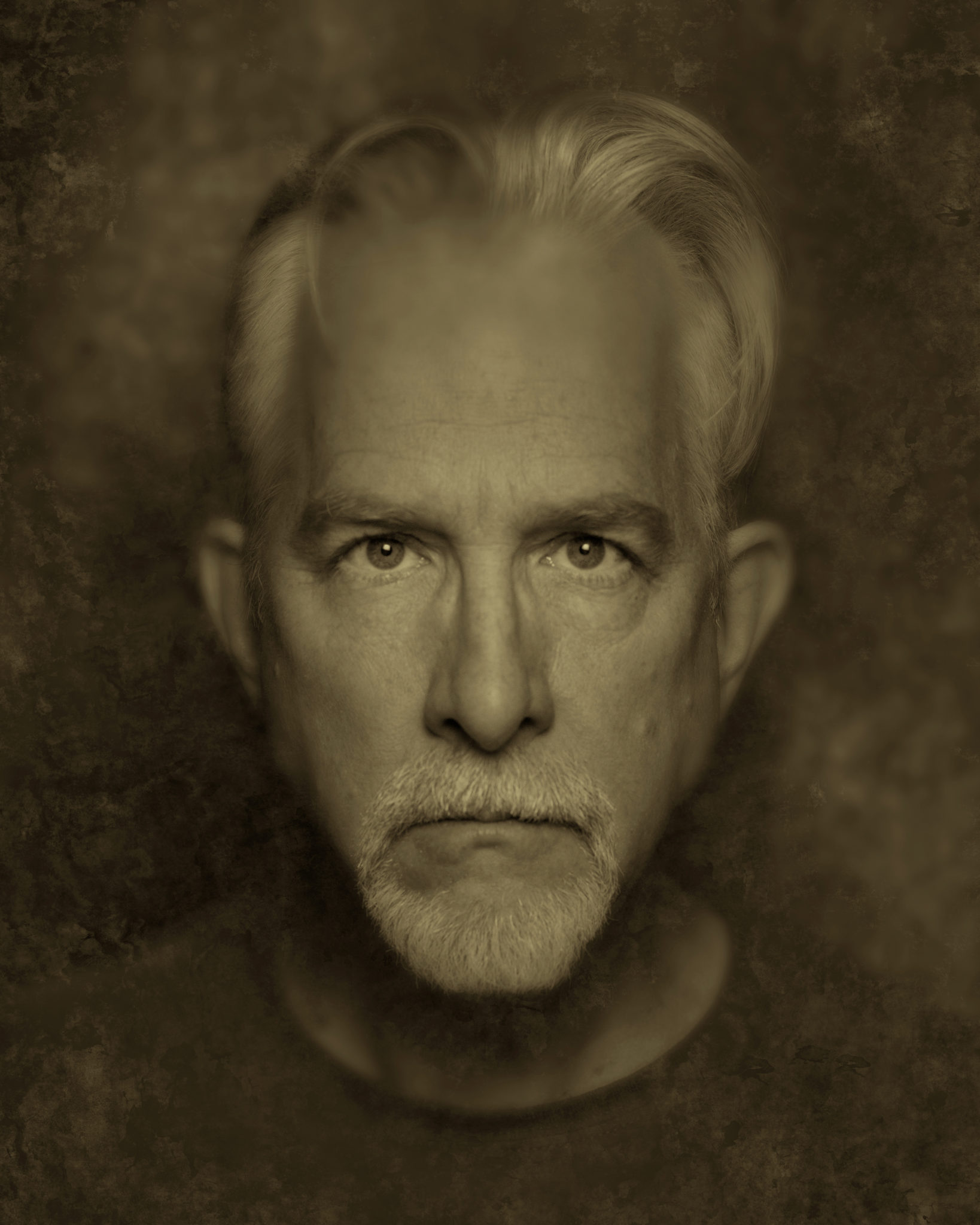
- Matt Mahurin, self portrait
- Born: January 31, 1959 (age 67); Santa Cruz, California, U.S.
- Known for: Illustration; photography; film director
- Notable work: Film I Like Killing Flies (2003); Film Feel (2006); Film Mugshot (1996); Book Matt Mahurin (1999)

Matthew S. Mahurin (born January 31, 1959) is an American illustrator, photographer and film director. Mahurin's illustrations appear in Time, Newsweek, Mother Jones, Rolling Stone, Esquire, Forbes, and The New York Times.

Mahurin's work as a photo essayist has dealt with subjects such as homelessness, people with AIDS, the Texas prison system, abortion clinics, Nicaragua, Haiti, and Belfast. His extensive work directing music videos since 1986 have resulted in working with U2, Queensrÿche, Metallica, Dreams So Real, Tracy Chapman, Tom Waits, R.E.M., Alice In Chains, Def Leppard and many other popular music performers.

Photographs by Mahurin, including Clemmons Prison, Texas (1985), Texas Prison (1988), Woman's Face in Darkness (1989) and Paris (1984), are included in the permanent collection of the Metropolitan Museum of Art.

Mahurin has a reputation for photographing himself and manipulating his own likeness in his commercial photo-illustration work. Examples of his own image appearing on magazine covers are the November 29, 1993 cover of Time, with Mahurin as Sigmund Freud, the March 14, 1994 cover of Time, with himself as a caveman and the May 17, 2004 Time cover where Mahurin posed and photographed himself as an Abu Ghraib prisoner.

Mahurin is also credited with a notorious Time cover of O. J. Simpson, featuring an altered mugshot which removed the photograph's color saturation (inadvertently making Simpson's skin darker), burned the corners, and reduced the size of the prisoner ID number. This appeared on newsstands next to an unaltered copy on the cover of Newsweek, which occasioned some controversy over photo manipulation.

== Awards ==
Film and video

- Eastman Kodak Award for Lifetime Achievement - Music Video Production Association Award (2003)
- Best American Independent Feature - Hamptons International Film Festival, for Mugshot (1996)
- MTV Video Music Award for Best Post-Modern Video, Orange Crush by R.E.M. (1989)

Photography and Photo-Illustration

- Alfred Eisenstaedt Awards for Magazine Photography "Cover Photograph of the year" for January 1997 cover of Rolling Stone of Marilyn Manson, and "Cutting Edge Photo Illustration" (1998)
- Art Directors Club, Merit Award for Feature Spread Illustration published by The Village Voice, "Unsafe: Why Gay Men Are Having Risky Sex" (1996)

== Filmography ==
=== Feature films ===
Director

- Feel (2006)
- I Like Killing Flies (2003)
- Mugshot (1996)

Photographs

- Siesta (1987)

=== Short films ===
Director

- The Reality of Hunger in New York City (2008)
- H2 Uh-Oh (2007)

=== Television ===
Director

- Imagining America "Tribe" (segment)
- Alive TV "Hammer" (segment)

== Videography ==
Director

- 10,000 Maniacs — "What's the Matter Here" (1987)
- Alice in Chains — "Angry Chair" (1992)
- Alice in Chains — "No Excuses" (1994)
- Better Than Ezra — "Rosealia" (1995)
- The Black Crowes — "She Talks to Angels" (1991)
- Body Count — "There Goes the Neighborhood" (1992)
- Bon Jovi — "Hey God" (1996)
- Bonnie Raitt — "Something to Talk About" (1991)
- Blind Melon — "Dear Ol' Dad" (1993)
- Bush — "Everything Zen" (1994)
- Bush — "Little Things" (1995)
- Tracy Chapman — "Fast Car" (1988)
- Cher — "Save Up All Your Tears" (1991)
- Cowboy Junkies — "Sweet Jane" (1991)
- Def Leppard — "Stand Up (Kick Love into Motion)" (1993)
- Def Leppard — "All I Want Is Everything" (1996)
- Disturbed — "The Sound of Silence" (2015)
- Disturbed - "A Reason to Fight" (2018)
- Disturbed - "No More" (2019)
- Disturbed - "If I Ever Lose My Faith in You" (2020)
- Disturbed featuring Ann Wilson - "Don’t Tell Me" (2024)
- Dreams So Real — "Rough Night In Jericho" (1988)
- Melissa Etheridge — "Happy Xmas (War Is Over)" (1994)
- John Fogerty — "Eye of the Zombie" (1986)
- Peter Gabriel — "Mercy Street" (1986)
- Peter Gabriel — "Red Rain" (1986)
- Peter Gabriel — "Come Talk to Me" (1993)
- Ghost — "Call Me Little Sunshine" (2022)
- Corey Glover — "April Rain" (1998)
- Jerry Harrison — "Man with a Gun" (1988)
- Inspiral Carpets — "Generations" (1992)
- Hole — "Gold Dust Woman" (1996)
- INXS with Ray Charles — "Please (You Got That...)" (1993)
- Donna Lewis — "Without Love" (1996)
- Living Colour — "Solace of You" (1990)
- Marilyn Manson — "We Are Chaos" (2020)
- Sarah McLachlan — "Building a Mystery" (1997) (uncredited)
- Metallica — "The Unforgiven" (1991)
- Metallica — "King Nothing" (1996)
- Metallica — "The Unforgiven II" (1998)
- Mötley Crüe — "Primal Scream" (1991)
- Mötley Crüe — "Home Sweet Home '91" (1991)
- Mystery Skulls — "Erase Me" (2017)
- Peter Murphy — "The Scarlet Thing in You" (1995)
- New Kids on the Block — "If You Go Away" (1992)
- Our Lady Peace — "Clumsy" (1998)
- Martin Page — "In the House of Stone and Light" (1994)
- Queensrÿche — "Empire" (1990)
- Queensrÿche — "Best I Can" (1990)
- Queensrÿche — "Silent Lucidity" (1990)
- Queensrÿche — "Another Rainy Night (Without You)" (1991)
- Queensrÿche — "Bridge" (1995)
- R.E.M. — "Orange Crush" (1988)
- Rush — "The Pass" (1989)
- Lou Reed — "What's Good" (1992)
- Lou Reed — "Hookywooky" (1996)
- The Lover Speaks — "No More "I Love You's"" (1986)
- Scorpions — "Alien Nation" (1993)
- Jane Siberry — "The Walking" (1988)
- Silversun Pickups — "The Royal We" (2010)
- Skid Row — "My Enemy" (1995)
- Skid Row — "Into Another" (1995)
- Soraya — "Suddenly" (1996)
- Soul Asylum — "Misery" (1995)
- Soundgarden — "Outshined" (1991)
- Soundgarden — "The Day I Tried to Live" (1994)
- Sting — "Gabriel's Message" (1987)
- Sturgill Simpson — "Brace for Impact (Live a Little)" (2016)
- Sturgill Simpson — "Breakers Roar" (2016)
- Sturgill Simpson — "All Around You" (2017)
- Sundays, The — "Love" (1992)
- Tears for Fears — "The Tipping Point" (2021)
- Therapy? — "Die Laughing" (1994)
- Tom Waits — "Hold On" (1999)
- Tom Waits — "What's He Building" (1999)
- Tom Waits — "Hell Broke Luce" (2011)
- U2 — "With or Without You" [version 1] (1987)
- U2 — "Love Is Blindness" (1993)
- U2 — "Song for Someone" (2015)
- Ugly Kid Joe — "Cat's in the Cradle" (1993)
- Ugly Kid Joe — "Busy Bee" (1993)
- Urge Overkill — "Take a Walk" (1993)
- Paul Westerberg — "Runaway Wind" (1993)

== Photography credits ==
- BoDeans — Love & Hope & Sex & Dreams cover, 1986
- Tracy Chapman — Tracy Chapman cover, 1988
- Ramones — Brain Drain, cover, 1989
- Ozzy Osbourne — No More Tears, cover, 1991
- Joe Satriani — The Extremist cover, 1992
- Marilyn Manson — Rolling Stone cover, January 1998 issue
- Tom Waits — Mule Variations cover, 2000
- Tom Waits — Alice, cover and concept, 2002
- Joan as Police Woman— To Survive cover, 2008
- Muse — Drones cover, 2015
- Fool In The Box — Fool In The Box III cover, 2018

== Bibliography ==
cover art

- The Doctor and the Soul — Book on Logotherapy by Viktor E. Frankl, cover, 1985 edition

photography books

- Matt Mahurin (ISBN 0-944092-60-8)
- Japan and America (ISBN 4-947671-01-7)
- Matt Mahurin. Edited by Maya Ishiwata, Theresa Luisotti. Designed by Hideyuki Taguchi. Tokyo, RAM Research of Art Media, 1993.

illustrated by for children

- My Beautiful Child (ISBN 0-439-45893-5)
- Once Upon a Cloud (ISBN 0-439-68879-5)
