= Are You Ready (Disturbed song) =

Single by Disturbed

from the album Evolution
- Released: August 16, 2018
- Recorded: 2018
- Genre: Heavy metal; hard rock
- Length: 4:21
- Label: Reprise; Warner Bros.
- Songwriters: Disturbed and Kevin Churko
- Producer: Kevin Churko

Disturbed singles chronology
"Open Your Eyes" (2016)	"Are You Ready" (2018)	"A Reason to Fight" (2018)

Music video
- "Are You Ready" on YouTube

"Are You Ready" is a song by American heavy metal band Disturbed. It was released on 16 August 2018, as the first single from their album Evolution. The song topped the Billboard Mainstream Rock Songs chart in September 2018.

== Background ==
In July 2018, upon the completion of recording the band's seventh studio album, Evolution, frontman David Draiman polled fans as to whether they preferred the first single to be a heavy rock song, more akin to most of their back catalogue, or a more mellow ballad song, more comparable to their cover of Simon & Garfunkel's "The Sound of Silence". Out of 80,000 respondents, over 83% chose "heavy" over "ballad". As a result, "Are You Ready" was released as the first single from the album on August 16, 2018. A music video was released on the same date.

Guitarist Dan Donegan noted that the song's origins trace back to 2004, as a musical idea he had written during the sessions for their Ten Thousand Fists album. He stated that he never finished the track in 2004, and it was pushed aside due to the band focusing on further-developed material instead, and was placed into the band's archives until 2018, when he presented it to Draiman, who instantly gravitated towards writing scat vocals for it.

== Themes and composition ==
Due to its origins as a 2004 song idea, Donegan described the song as having an "old Disturbed sound". One publication alluded to it as a "heavy" song.

== Reception ==
Heavy.com, in documenting fan reaction, noted that the song was generally positively received, with most noting its similarity to the band's earlier albums, which was cited as both a positive and negative trait by various commenters. MetalSucks agreed with the notion. Despite its heavier nature, Wall of Sound praised the song as one that would also appeal to an older generation of listeners that may have started to follow the band later in their career after the crossover success of their cover of "The Sound of Silence".

== Track listing ==
Are You Ready EP

1. "Are You Ready"
2. "Uninvited Guest"
3. "This Venom"
4. "Are You Ready" (Sam de Jong Remix)

== Personnel ==
Disturbed

- David Draiman – lead vocals
- Dan Donegan – guitars, keyboards, programming
- John Moyer – bass
- Mike Wengren – drums

== Charts ==
=== Weekly charts ===
Weekly chart performance for "Are You Ready"
Chart (2018)	Peak position
Canada Rock (Billboard)	14
Czech Republic Rock (IFPI)	4
Finland (Suomen virallinen lista)	95
German Alternative Singles (Deutsche Alternative Charts)	7
New Zealand Hot Singles (RMNZ)	32
US Hot Rock & Alternative Songs (Billboard)	12
US Rock & Alternative Airplay (Billboard)	10

=== Year-end charts ===
2018 year-end chart performance for "Are You Ready"
Chart (2018)	Position
US Hot Rock Songs (Billboard)	53
US Rock Airplay (Billboard)	47

2019 year-end chart performance for "Are You Ready"
Chart (2019)	Position
US Hot Rock Songs (Billboard)	93

== Certifications ==
Region	Certification	Certified units/sales
Canada (Music Canada)	Gold	40,000^{‡}
United States (RIAA)	Gold	500,000^{‡}
^{‡} Sales+streaming figures based on certification alone.
