= Evolution (Disturbed album) =

Studio album by Disturbed
- Released: October 19, 2018
- Recorded: January–June 2018
- Studios: The Hideout Recording Studio; Las Vegas, Nevada
- Genres: Hard rock; alternative metal
- Length: 43:14
- Labels: Reprise; Warner Bros.
- Producer: Kevin Churko

Disturbed chronology
Immortalized (2015)	Evolution (2018)	Divisive (2022)

Singles from Evolution
- 1. "Are You Ready" Released: August 16, 2018; 2. "A Reason to Fight" Released: September 21, 2018; 3. "No More" Released: June 2, 2019; 4. "Hold On to Memories" Released: January 7, 2020

Evolution is the seventh studio album by American heavy metal band Disturbed. It was released on October 19, 2018, by Reprise Records. The album's first single, "Are You Ready", was released before the album in August 2018, while the second single, "A Reason to Fight", was released a month later. The third single, "No More", was released on June 2, 2019.

Evolution features more ballads and acoustic tracks compared to previous albums by the band. It debuted at number four on the Billboard 200, making it Disturbed's sixth straight top 5 album. It is the band's first album since The Sickness not to reach number one, thus ending the band's streak of number one albums at five. It received mixed reviews from critics.

== Background and recording ==
The band announced in January 2018 that they had begun recording their seventh studio album. Recording finished in June with just mixing and mastering needing to be done. It was the band's first album in over three years and the band's first album in over eight years to involve bass guitarist John Moyer. Frontman David Draiman stated that the writing and recording of the album was influenced by classic rock that members have listened to in their youth. Guitarist Dan Donegan stated that the album's title was representative of their goal on the album, to challenge themselves to evolve their sound. He also revealed that there would be no new cover songs from this album's cycle. Draiman stated that Evolution is the band's "Black Album". He also said that the album covers topics in today's society such as government, death, war, addiction, and technology.

The album is a tribute to deceased heavy metal musicians such as Chester Bennington of Linkin Park and Vinnie Paul of Pantera, with whom Disturbed were friends and toured with over the years.

== Promotion and release ==
On August 16, 2018, the album's name was revealed as Evolution, and the first single, "Are You Ready", was released. On the same day, the album's track listing, artwork and release date were also revealed. A second song, "A Reason to Fight", was released on September 21, 2018. A third song, "No More", was released on June 2, 2019. All three songs were released as singles and topped the Billboard Mainstream Rock Songs chart, making them the fifth, sixth, and seventh singles in a row by the band to top the chart, the longest streak of consecutive number-ones by any band as of September 2021. A fourth single, "Hold On to Memories", was released in late 2019 and peaked at #3 in early 2020, ending their streak of consecutive number-ones.

The band held a worldwide tour, with Three Days Grace on North American stops, from January to May 2019 to promote the album.

== Reception ==
Professional ratings
Aggregate scores
Source	Rating
Metacritic	58/100
Review scores
Source	Rating
AllMusic	3/5 stars
Blabbermouth.net	6.5/10
Classic Rock	4/5 stars
Consequence of Sound	B−
Exclaim!	4/10
Kerrang!	3/5 stars
Metal Hammer	4/5 stars
The Music	3/5 stars
NME	2/5 stars
Sputnikmusic	2.3/5

On review aggregation website Metacritic, the album has a score of 58/100 based on seven reviews, indicating "mixed or average reviews". Consequence of Sound writer Spencer Kaufman stated that "The heavy songs on Evolution should please longtime fans, with a couple harkening back to the dynamism of Disturbed's first couple of albums, but the glut of softer tracks may have been served better on a separate acoustic EP." AllMusic gave the album 3 out of 5 stars, the same as Immortalized, and said "While it's hard to argue that Evolution lives up to its moniker, the familiarity of the architecture is lent considerable gravitas by the overall execution, which as per usual, leaves nothing but perspiration in its wake."

Prior to the release of the album, the band had their prior five albums in a row debut at number one on the Billboard 200. Evolution debuted at number four, breaking the streak, which would have made them the only band other than Dave Matthews Band and Metallica to have done so.

At the end of the funeral for Ariel, Kfir, and Shiri Bibas, the song "Hold on to Memories" played, causing the song to top the Spotify charts in Israel.

== Track listing ==
All music composed by Disturbed and Kevin Churko, except as indicated.

No.	Title	Length
1.	"Are You Ready"	4:21
2.	"No More"	3:52
3.	"A Reason to Fight"	4:44
4.	"In Another Time"	4:11
5.	"Stronger on Your Own"	4:01
6.	"Hold On to Memories"	5:03
7.	"Saviour of Nothing"	4:12
8.	"Watch You Burn"	4:20
9.	"The Best Ones Lie"	4:02
10.	"Already Gone"	4:28
Total length:		43:14

Deluxe edition and Japanese edition bonus tracks
No.	Title	Writer(s)	Length
11.	"The Sound of Silence" (live, featuring Myles Kennedy)	Paul Simon	4:52
12.	"This Venom"		4:19
13.	"Are You Ready (Sam de Jong Remix)"		3:36
14.	"Uninvited Guest"	Diane Warren; Disturbed	3:55
Total length:			59:56

== Personnel ==
Credits adapted from album's liner notes.

Disturbed

- David Draiman – lead and background vocals
- Dan Donegan – guitars, bass, piano, electronics, background vocals
- Mike Wengren – drums, percussion, background vocals
- John Moyer – bass, background vocals

Additional musicians

- Kevin Churko – additional keyboards and programming

Production

- Kevin Churko – producer, engineer, mixing
- Kane Churko – additional engineering
- Tristan Hardin – additional engineering
- Khloe Churko – general assistance and studio manager
- Ted Jensen – mastering

Deluxe edition

- Myles Kennedy – guest vocals (track 11)
- Jeremy Jayson – additional live guitar (track 11)
- Disturbed – producer (track 11)
- Ashton Parsons – engineer, mixing (track 11)
- Brent Carpenter – engineer (track 11)
- Sam de Jong – producer, engineer, mixing, and programming (track 13)
- Kevin Churko – engineer and additional production (track 13)
- Ted Jensen – mastering (track 13)
- David Foster – producer and keyboards (track 14)
- Warren Huart – engineer (track 14)
- Matthew Knobel – assistant engineer (track 14)
- Jochem van der Saag – mixing and programming (track 14)
- Sean Hurley – bass (track 14)

== Charts ==
=== Weekly charts ===
Weekly chart performance for Evolution
Chart (2018)	Peak position
Australian Albums (ARIA)	3
Austrian Albums (Ö3 Austria)	5
Belgian Albums (Ultratop Flanders)	13
Belgian Albums (Ultratop Wallonia)	41
Canadian Albums (Billboard)	4
Czech Albums (ČNS IFPI)	33
Danish Albums (Hitlisten)	31
Dutch Albums (Album Top 100)	28
Finnish Albums (Suomen virallinen lista)	7
German Albums (Offizielle Top 100)	2
Hungarian Albums (MAHASZ)	7
Irish Albums (IRMA)	51
Italian Albums (FIMI)	30
Japanese Albums (Oricon)	196
New Zealand Albums (RMNZ)	2
Norwegian Albums (VG-lista)	7
Portuguese Albums (AFP)	25
Scottish Albums (Official Charts)	8
Spanish Albums (PROMUSICAE)	22
Swedish Albums (Sverigetopplistan)	9
Swiss Albums (Schweizer Hitparade)	4
UK Albums (Official Charts)	7
UK Rock & Metal Albums (Official Charts)	1
US Billboard 200	4
US Top Alternative Albums (Billboard)	1
US Top Hard Rock Albums (Billboard)	1
US Top Rock Albums (Billboard)	1

=== Year-end charts ===
Year-end chart performance for Evolution
Chart (2018)	Position
Germany (Official German Charts)	85
US Top Album Sales (Billboard)	54
US Top Rock Albums (Billboard)	61

Chart (2019)	Position
US Top Rock Albums (Billboard)	58

== Certifications ==
Certifications for Evolution
Region	Certification	Certified units/sales
New Zealand (RMNZ)	Gold	7,500^{‡}
United Kingdom (BPI)	Silver	60,000^{‡}
^{‡} Sales+streaming figures based on certification alone.
