= Yukhu =

Azerbaijani rock band

Yukhu Azerbaijani: Yuxu
- Origin: Sumgait, Azerbaijan
- Genres: Heavy metal, Hard rock, Folk rock, Blues
- Years active: 1987–2001, 2025-present
- Labels: Uzelli Muzik, ADA Muzik
- Spinoffs: Sirr
- Members: Chingiz Eyvazov; Elchin Emin; Lachin Gahramanov; Babakhan Garayev; Ilyas Zabihi
- Past members: Ibrahim Emin; Namig Naghdaliyev; Jasur Nematov; Serkan Civelek; Ali; Zaur Abdullayev

Yukhu (Azerbaijani: Yuxu (Latin)/Јуху (Cyrillic), Russian: Юху [juˈxu], Turkish: Yuhu) is an Azerbaijani rock band based in Sumgait, Azerbaijan from 1987 to 1991, and later in Istanbul, Turkey from 1991 to 2001. They were one of the most popular rock band during the 1990s in Turkey and Azerbaijan. The band was active from 1988 until 1991 in Azerbaijan, from 1991 to 2001 in Turkey. The group released three studio albums.

Yukhu became known for singing exclusively in the Azerbaijani language.

== Early years ==
From the beginning of the 1980s, western rock music was spread to the USSR. Deep Purple and Scorpions were some of famous bands what people began to recognize with rock music. In these days, Ibrahim Eminov, who was in his 20s, decided to create a rock band with his friend Chingiz Eyvazov. He chose the name "Yukhu" (Meaning 'Dream' in the Azerbaijani language) and created the band in 1988. He later explained this decision in an interview, stating he chose Yukhu because he wanted a universal name, and Yukhu's pronunciation was similar to "You who?", making it easier for English speakers to use.

Namig Naghdaliyev joined the band as main guitarist after his completion of military duty along with vocalist Jasur Nematov, completing the band. "Yukhu" had worked for the "Dostluq" (Friendship) organization in 1987. Later in the same year, their first performance was held at "Chemist Culture Palace".

In 1989, the band took part at the "Golden Autumn" (Azerbaijani: Qızıl payız) musical festival with their song "Xəzərin sahilində" (Azerbaijani: On the Coast of the Caspian Sea). A part of the prize was a demo tape, which was recorded in Baku in December that year, featuring "Xəzərin sahilində", three other songs and an instrumental composition.

In mid-1990, Azar Aliev, propaganda director of the Young Communist League of Azerbaijan, took Yukhu's demo tape, as well as tapes by two other popular Azeri rock bands, Dervish and Taj, to the directors of the Mayence Rock festival in Mainz, West Germany. Yukhu was selected to appear on the festival's official album for that year, with their song "Ana" (Mother), although the band name was listed as "IOXY" (a misreading of Юху, the band's Russian name). Yukhu never ended up performing at the festival - Dervish ended up making the trip to Germany in their stead.

The band members met with Yashar Bakhish and the chairman of ANS TV and Rokoko magazine, Vahid "Nakhysh" Mustafayev in Autumn of 1991. Mustafayev had suggested filming a music video for "Xəzərin sahilində", and the band accepted. The music video to "Xəzərin sahilində", directed by Mustafayev and shot in Sumgayit, began airing on ANS TV in 1991. During this time, the band would play with a live keyboardist, Namig Guliyev.

== 1991 - 2001 ==
A second demo tape was recorded in 1991, featuring five new songs with a more pop-like style. A French manager, Pascal, who had previously met them in 1989 at Golden Autumn, began to revive the group's original plans to go to France. Later that year, Naghdaliyev, Emin and Eyvazov left Azerbaijan, moved to Turkey and began to work in a local shop selling jackets. The owner of the shop was able to set the group up with a residency at the TUAL pub, and the group began performing without Nematov, who was studying in Moscow at the time. Turkish singer Serkan Civelek would sing for the group during this period. In 1992, Nematov followed his bandmates to Turkey to rejoin Yukhu.

A friend of the band, Tevfik Yılmaz, introduced the band to İsmail Uzelli, owner of the Uzelli record label, and the band's two demo tapes were combined and released as their debut album Xəzərin sahilində on 11 October 1993. Around this time, they began to record their second album, Sumqayıt, which was released in early 1994. Pascal also invited them to France, but they never made the trip (there are conflicting stories as to why) and remained in Turkey for the rest of their career.

Yuxu's final Azerbaijani performance took place in Baku on 31 January 1993, performing as an instrumental trio at the RokOko festival. They won second place.

In 1994, Nematov left the band and returned to Moscow to complete his studies. In 1997, he was replaced by ex-Taj bassist Zaur Abdullayev, after a spell with Ali, a friend of the band, on vocals. Nematov and Abdullayev had coincidentally performed together in Taj. Abdullayev led the band in recording what would become the group's final album, Ölümə çare yox, in 1998. It would not be released until 2001.

== After Yukhu ==
Yukhu split after the 1999 İzmit earthquake due to collapse of their last studio, ADA Muzik. Naghdaliyev and Eyvazov stayed in Turkey. Eyvazov became a tattoo artist and Naghdaliyev continued to involve himself in music, becoming well known as the guitarist for Kıraç. He would also change his name to the Turkish form Namık Nağdaliyev. Later Eyvazov returned to Baku and currently lives there. Ibrahim Emin also returned from Turkey in 2003 to form the group Sirr in 2004. He became bassist of the band until its split in 2015, and remained in Azerbaijan for the rest of his life. However, the former members claim the band has not disbanded, but due to members living in different countries, the band cannot reunite.

Emin died on 2 July 2019. On 20 September 2020, Xəzərin sahilində was released on vinyl.

In 2023, Nematov returned to Azerbaijan and performed old Yukhu songs with the rock band Ayna. He has since embarked on a solo career. On 27 August, he published an interview with 1news.az discussing the renaissance of his music career, and also stated that he did not believe Yukhu could reunite.

In early 2025, Eyvazov began posting videos to an official Yukhu Instagram account, showing him performing some of the band's songs with a new lineup, consisting of vocalist Hasan Rzayev, guitarist Vusal Mehdizadeh, bassist Elchin Eminov and keyboardist Lachin Gahramanov. According to Eyvazov, Nematov was asked to join the new band, but refused, citing the success of his solo career.

On 3 September 2025, the new Yukhu announced the release of its debut single "Sənin üçün" for the 5th.

== Members ==
Current

- Chingiz Eyvazov − drums (1987–2001, 2024–present)
- Elchin Emin - bass (2024–present)
- Lachin Gahramanov - keyboards (2024–present)
- Babakhan Garayev - vocals and guitar(2024–present)
- Ilyas Zabihi - guitar (2024–present)

Former

- Jasur Nematov − vocals (1987–1991, 1992–1994)
- Serkan Civelek - vocals (1991–1992)
- Ali - vocals (1994–1997)
- Ibrahim Emin − bass guitar, backing vocals (1987–2001; died 2019)
- Namig Naghdaliyev − guitar (1987–2001)
- Zaur Abdullayev − vocals (1997–2001)

== Discography ==
- "Xəzərin sahilində/Хәзәрин саһилиндә" (On the Coast of the Caspian Sea, 1993)
- "Sumqayıt/Сумгајыт" (Sumgait, 1994)
- "Ölümə çarə yox/Өлүмә чарә јох" (There is No Cure for Death, 2001)
