= From the Pinnacle to the Pit =

Single by Ghost

from the album Meliora
- Released: July 17, 2015
- Recorded: January 2015
- Genre: Doom metal; hard rock; psychedelic rock
- Length: 4:03
- Label: Loma Vista
- Songwriters: Tobias Forge; Klas Åhlund
- Producer: Klas Åhlund

Ghost singles chronology
"Cirice" (2015)	"From the Pinnacle to the Pit" (2015)	"Majesty" (2015)

"From the Pinnacle to the Pit" is a song by the Swedish rock band Ghost. The track was released as the second single from the group's third studio album Meliora.

== Background and release ==
A Nameless Ghoul called "From the Pinnacle to the Pit" a "truly stomping riff-based song, Led Zeppelin-style" and "something that would sound great coming out of a car stereo in an American high school parking lot." The song was released on July 17, 2015.

== Music video ==
The song's music video was directed by Zev Deans, and was filmed in a style reminiscent of 1920s silent movies. Clips from the 1949 educational film Act Your Age, the 1949 film Forces Occultes and the 1930 Cecille B DeMille movie Madame Satan were also used, including a scene where actress Kay Johnson and actor Reginald Denny danced. In the video, a student is sent to the headmaster's office only to be shown how man can harness the power of a god. The student is turned into an all-powerful man who despises what he's become. This evolves into the creation of Ghost vocalist Papa Emeritus III.

== Personnel ==
Music

- Papa Emeritus III − vocals
- Nameless Ghouls – all instrumentalists: lead guitarist, bassist, keyboardist, drummer, rhythm guitarist

Artwork

- David M. Brinley – single artwork
