= Immortalized (Disturbed album) =

- Cover art by Raymond Swanland featuring The Guy

Studio album by Disturbed
- Released: August 21, 2015
- Recorded: January–May 2015
- Studio: The Hideout Recording Studio; Las Vegas, Nevada
- Genre: Heavy metal; alternative metal; hard rock
- Length: 53:28
- Label: Reprise; Warner Bros.
- Producer: Kevin Churko

Disturbed chronology
The Lost Children (2011)	Immortalized (2015)	Evolution (2018)

Singles from Immortalized
- 1. "The Vengeful One" Released: June 25, 2015; 2. "The Light" Released: October 5, 2015; 3. "The Sound of Silence" Released: December 7, 2015; 4. "Open Your Eyes" Released: July 19, 2016

Immortalized is the sixth studio album by American heavy metal band Disturbed. The album was released on August 21, 2015, by Reprise Records, and is Disturbed's first studio album since Asylum (2010), marking the longest gap between two studio albums in their career.

With 98,000 album-equivalent units in its first week, Immortalized is Disturbed's fifth consecutive number one debut on the United States Billboard 200 chart. They are the third band in history to achieve this feat, after Metallica and Dave Matthews Band. The band also found crossover success in the album's third single, a cover of the 1964 song "The Sound of Silence" by Simon & Garfunkel, which marked Disturbed's highest ranked single on the Billboard Hot 100 at number 42 and has since become Disturbed's biggest song since "Down with the Sickness".

This is the band's only studio album to be recorded as a trio, as bass player John Moyer did not participate on the recording sessions due to working on other projects. Guitarist Dan Donegan performed all the bass tracks.

== Production and recording ==
In 2011, following the tour of their fifth studio album, Asylum, Disturbed announced that they would go on a hiatus. During the hiatus, the band released a compilation album of previously recorded B-sides, The Lost Children (2011), and a box set of their five studio albums, The Collection (2012).

In January 2014, band members David Draiman (vocals), Dan Donegan (guitar), Mike Wengren (drums) met for dinner and began secretly writing material for Disturbed's sixth studio album. Bass player John Moyer was not present for the album's making, due to working with other bands and projects. The album was recorded at The Hideout Recording Studio in Las Vegas with record producer Kevin Churko. Dan Donegan told The Pulse of Radio about working with a new producer: "I think we needed… we wanted that. We wanted, especially having this time off, and being off this long break, to come back with something that sounds a little bit more fresh. It's been five years between albums, so it was nice to have, kind of, a new production element to it and things that, kind of, pushed us and challenged us to raise the bar." Draiman told Billboard regarding the songwriting process: "There's a lot of new and fresh in the mix. We had more input on each other's parts than we probably ever had previously. Everything was really put under the microscope and everybody had an opinion, and, believe me, everyone was voicing them loudly... We were very, very cooperative with one another, very professional the entire time — not that we haven't always been, but especially this time."

One of the bonus tracks, "Legion of Monsters," was inspired by Rolling Stone's August 2013 cover featuring then-accused Boston Marathon bomber Dzhokhar Tsarnaev. David Draiman wrote an angry condemnation of the magazine for "glorifying killers" in a lengthy Facebook rant. "Legion of Monsters" is a criticism of the news media for "inspiring others to do what they (killers) did."

== Promotion and release ==
Immortalized was announced on June 25, 2015, alongside the release of lead single "The Vengeful One". The single released with an accompanying animated video directed by filmmaker Phil Mucci. The album's title track was released with an official lyrics video on July 24. Two additional songs, "Fire It Up" and "What Are You Waiting For" were released on July 31 and August 7, respectively. On August 14, the whole album was made available for streaming via iTunes First Play.

Due to the murders of Alison Parker and Adam Ward, Warner Bros. Records decided to pull one of the television commercials for the album as the ad depicted an incident similar to the killings.

== Critical reception ==
Professional ratings
Aggregate scores
Source	Rating
Metacritic	55/100
Review scores
Source	Rating
AllMusic	3/5 stars
Classic Rock	3.5/5 stars
Consequence of Sound	D
Distorted Sound	8/10
Kerrang!	3/5 stars
Melodic	3/5 stars
Metal Hammer	3/5 stars
The Music	3/5 stars
Sputnikmusic	3.0/5
The Sydney Morning Herald	2/5 stars

Review aggregator Metacritic gave the album a score of 55 out of 100 based on five professional reviews, citing "mixed or average reviews". James Christopher Monger from AllMusic gave the album a three out of five stating, "A five-year break between albums should lend itself to a bit of growth, even for a band as everyman as Disturbed, but there's just not much here to keep the group's detractors from bringing out their pitchforks, and over time, staying the course may leave fewer and fewer townsfolk to protect them." Irving Tan of Sputnikmusic gave the album the same score saying, "While the album also has its fair share of bona fide, looks-like-we-just-broke-the-bottom-of-the-barrel moments ("Fire It Up" instantly comes to mind here), Disturbed manage to do just enough to keep metal purists from dispensing with them completely." Loudwire's Chad Bowar said "They have always known how to write hit singles, with a string of number ones over the years. They made the record label's job nearly impossible on the new record, because out of the 13 songs on the standard edition of the album, more than half could legitimately be rock radio hit singles." Bowar concluded his review saying "It won't change the minds of those who weren't fans before, but the album will hit the spot with the band's legions of worshipers."

Jon Hadusek from Consequence of Sound was highly critical of the album giving it a D rating and saying "In this way, Immortalized is a for-fans-only release. It openly and so earnestly feeds its target audience, as if to scoff at the very idea of Art vs. Product. Lamb of God found a balance between the two with their latest album, VII: Sturm und Drang, which shines as a recent example of how to move forward artistically and still appeal to one's core fans and sell records. With Immortalized, Disturbed don't even try."

=== Accolades ===
Region	Year	Publication	Accolade	Rank
United States	2015	Loudwire	20 Best Rock Albums of 2015	4
United States	2015	Revolver	Top 20 Albums of 2015	14

Grammy Awards

Year	Nominee / work	Award	Result
2017	The Sound of Silence	Best Rock Performance	Nominated

Loudwire Music Awards

Year	Nominee / work	Award	Result
2015	Immortalized	Best Rock Album	Nominated
2015	"The Vengeful One"	Best Rock Song	Nominated
2015	"The Vengeful One"	Best Rock Video	Nominated

== Commercial performance ==
The album, which earned 98,000 album-equivalent units in its first week, is Disturbed's fifth consecutive number one debut on the United States Billboard 200 chart. By November 12, 2015, Immortalized had sold over 180,000 copies in the United States. By January 25, 2017, Immortalized had sold approximately 561,000 copies in the United States. On January 25, 2018, Immortalized had been certified platinum by the RIAA in the United States, signifying sales in excess of over 1,000,000 copies.

== Track listing ==
All music composed and performed by Disturbed, except as indicated.

No.	Title	Length
1.	"The Eye of the Storm" (Intro)	1:20
2.	"Immortalized"	4:17
3.	"The Vengeful One"	4:12
4.	"Open Your Eyes"	3:57
5.	"The Light"	4:16
6.	"What Are You Waiting For"	4:03
7.	"You're Mine"	4:55
8.	"Who"	4:46
9.	"Save Our Last Goodbye"	4:59
10.	"Fire It Up"	4:05
11.	"The Sound of Silence" (Simon & Garfunkel cover)	4:08
12.	"Never Wrong"	3:33
13.	"Who Taught You How to Hate"	4:57
Total length:		53:28

Deluxe edition
No.	Title	Length
14.	"Tyrant"	3:47
15.	"Legion of Monsters"	4:33
16.	"The Brave and the Bold"	4:34
Total length:		66:14

Exclusive digital
No.	Title	Length
17.	"Warning Sign"	3:33
Total length:		69:47

Exclusive vinyl pictures disc
No.	Title	Length
18.	"The Vengeful One" (instrumental)	4:12
Total length:		73:54

== Personnel ==
Credits adapted from AllMusic.

Disturbed

- David Draiman – lead vocals and backing vocals
- Dan Donegan – guitars, bass, EBow, keyboards, backing vocals, acoustic guitar and piano on "The Sound of Silence"
- Mike Wengren – drums, percussion, backing vocals and timpani on "The Sound of Silence"
- John Moyer – bass (credited but does not play)

Additional musicians

- Bob Sanders – voicemail speaker on "Save Our Last Goodbye"
- Kevin Churko – additional arrangement on "The Sound of Silence"
- Samantha Maloney – additional orchestral arrangement on "The Vengeful One" and "The Sound of Silence"
- Suzie Katayama – additional conductor, arrangement on "The Sound of Silence"
- Steve Churchyard – additional engineering on "The Sound of Silence"
- John Feldmann – co-writer on "What Are You Waiting For" and "Open Your Eyes"
- Nick Furlong – co-writer on "Open Your Eyes"

Production and design

- Kevin Churko – engineer, mixing and production
- Kane Churko, Shawn McGhee – additional Pro-Tools editing
- Pete Winfield – additional mixing
- Charlie Paakari, Khloe Churko – studio management, general assistance
- Ted Jensen – engineer, layout, mastering, mixing
- Alex Tenta, Raymond Swanland – art direction, artwork, design, cover art, illustration
- Travis Shinn – photography

== Charts ==
=== Weekly charts ===
Chart (2015–19)	Peak position
Australian Albums (ARIA)	1
Austrian Albums (Ö3 Austria)	2
Belgian Albums (Ultratop Flanders)	12
Belgian Albums (Ultratop Wallonia)	19
Canadian Albums (Billboard)	1
Dutch Albums (Album Top 100)	11
Finnish Albums (Suomen virallinen lista)	7
French Albums (SNEP)	57
German Albums (Offizielle Top 100)	2
Hungarian Albums (MAHASZ)	23
Irish Albums (IRMA)	24
Italian Albums (FIMI)	45
Japanese Albums (Oricon)	88
Mexican Albums (Top 100 Mexico)	66
New Zealand Albums (RMNZ)	2
Polish Albums (ZPAV)	35
Portuguese Albums (AFP)	18
Scottish Albums (OCC)	4
Swedish Albums (Sverigetopplistan)	9
Swiss Albums (Schweizer Hitparade)	5
UK Albums (OCC)	8
US Billboard 200	1
US Top Hard Rock Albums (Billboard)	1
US Top Rock Albums (Billboard)	1
US Top Alternative Albums (Billboard)	1

=== Year-end charts ===
Chart (2015)	Position
Australian Albums (ARIA)	63
New Zealand Albums (RMNZ)	48
US Billboard 200	158
US Top Rock Albums (Billboard)	18
Chart (2016)	Position
Australian Albums (ARIA)	21
Austrian Albums (Ö3 Austria)	16
Canadian Albums (Billboard)	30
Danish Albums (Hitlisten)	89
German Albums (Offizielle Top 100)	33
New Zealand Albums (RMNZ)	24
Swedish Albums (Sverigetopplistan)	36
US Billboard 200	46
US Top Rock Albums (Billboard)	7
Chart (2017)	Position
Swedish Albums (Sverigetopplistan)	82
US Top Rock Albums (Billboard)	45

== Certifications ==
Region	Certification	Certified units/sales
Australia (ARIA)	Platinum	70,000^{‡}
Austria (IFPI Austria)	Gold	7,500^{*}
Canada (Music Canada)	2× Platinum	160,000^{‡}
Denmark (IFPI Danmark)	Platinum	20,000^{‡}
Germany (BVMI)	Platinum	200,000^{‡}
New Zealand (RMNZ)	2× Platinum	30,000^{‡}
Norway (IFPI Norway)	Platinum	20,000^{‡}
Sweden (GLF)	Gold	20,000^{‡}
United Kingdom (BPI)	Gold	100,000^{‡}
United States (RIAA)	2× Platinum	2,000,000^{‡}
^{*} Sales figures based on certification alone.^{‡} Sales+streaming figures based on certification alone.

== In popular culture ==
Three of the tracks in the album were released as downloadable content in the video game Rock Band 4. "Immortalized" and "The Vengeful One" were released as DLC tracks for the game on January 12, 2016, while "The Sound of Silence" was released for the DLC roster on September 27, 2016.

The AMC show Into the Badlands features Disturbed's version of "The Sound of Silence" in episode 13 of season 3 ("Black Lotus, White Rose").

== See also ==
- List of number-one albums of 2015 (Australia)
- List of number-one albums of 2016 (Australia)
- List of number-one albums of 2015 (Canada)
- List of Billboard 200 number-one albums of 2015
