= No More (Disturbed song) =

2019 single by Disturbed

Single by Disturbed

from the album Evolution
- Released: June 2, 2019
- Length: 3:52
- Label: Reprise; Warner
- Songwriters: David Draiman; Dan Donegan; John Moyer; Mike Wengren; Kevin Churko
- Producer: Churko

Disturbed singles chronology
"A Reason to Fight" (2018)	"No More" (2019)	"Hold On to Memories" (2020)

Music video
- "No More" on YouTube

"No More" is a song by American heavy metal band Disturbed. It is the third single and second track from their seventh album, Evolution. It reached No. 1 on the Billboard Mainstream Rock Airplay chart in September 2019.

== Background and themes ==
In a track-by-track guide to Evolution, David Draiman said the song conveys the repeated use of fear and conflict to justify war and the profits that often result. He said it is intended to encourage listeners to see through these stories, emphasizing that it is not directed at any specific country, government, or historical period.

== Composition ==
In a review of Evolution, Eleanor Goodman of Metal Hammer described the song as one of the album's large-scale, arena-oriented songs and called it "stompy" and "militaristic".

== Reception ==
Brendan Crabb of The Music called it a hook-laden song that would "tick the boxes" for diehard fans, while James Christopher Monger of AllMusic called it a "meat-and-potatoes stadium shaker". Max Morin of Exclaim! said that the song surges with unbridled energy and has "killer production", and that it's sure to set stadiums alight. Loudwire called the track "swinging" and "politically-tinged", while Metal Hammer said that the song is a "rallying cry" among the album's rhythmic, galvanising songs. Spencer Kaufman of Consequence called the song "another banger" and said it might be the strongest track on the album, both in music and lyrics, pointing out its criticism of the reasons behind war. He included it as an essential track and called it an anti-war anthem. Ray Van Horn Jr. of Blabbermouth said the track's "hoisted march" uses guitar riffs from the 1970s and 1980s, giving it a "happy bob" foreshadowing the fall of a "politically bankrupt society".

== Music video and live release ==
The official music video was released on June 27, 2019, and was directed by Matt Mahurin.

A live version of the song appears on the digital EP "Live From Alexandra Palace, London". It was recorded on May 11, 2019, during the band's "Evolution Tour" and released digitally on June 27.

== Chart performance ==
It reached No. 1 on the Billboard Mainstream Rock Airplay chart on September 7, 2019, their tenth song to do so. It was the band's seventh consecutive No. 1 on the chart.

== Personnel ==
Credits adapted from Apple Music.

Disturbed

- David Draiman - lead vocals, background vocals, songwriter
- Dan Donegan - guitar, keyboards, background vocals, electronics, songwriter
- John Moyer - bass guitar, songwriter
- Mike Wengren - drums, percussion, background vocals, songwriter

Additional credits

- Kevin Churko - programming, keyboards, songwriter, producer, mixing engineer, recording engineer

== Charts ==
=== Weekly charts ===
Weekly chart performance for "No More"
Chart (2019)	Peak position
Canada Rock (Billboard)	39
Finland (Suomen virallinen lista)	87
US Hot Rock & Alternative Songs (Billboard)	24
US Rock & Alternative Airplay (Billboard)	15
US Mainstream Rock Airplay (Billboard)	1

=== Year-end charts ===
Year-end chart performance for "No More"
Chart (2019)	Position
US Mainstream Rock (Billboard)	15
