= Ibrahim Emin =

Azerbaijani musician and composer (1963–2019)

Ibrahim Emin İbrahim Emin
- Born: 18 May 1963; Sumqayit, Azerbaijan Soviet Socialist Republic, Soviet Union
- Origin: Azerbaijan
- Died: 2 July 2019 (aged 56) Sumqayit, Azerbaijan
- Genres: Hard rock; heavy metal; blues rock
- Occupations: Musician; songwriter; composer
- Instruments: Vocals; bass guitar; guitar
- Years active: 1976–2019

Ibrahim Maharram oglu Eminov (Azerbaijani: İbrahim Məhərrəm oğlu Eminov / Ибраһим Мәһәррәм оғлу Еминов, pronounced [ibɾɑˈhim mæhæˈɾæm oɣˈlu eˈminof]; 18 May 1963 - 2 July 2019) was an Azerbaijani musician and composer, co-founder of the bands "Yukhu" and "Sirr".

== Biography ==
Ibrahim Emin was born on 18 May 1963 in Sumgayit. In 1970, he started the school № 17 in Sumgayit. He served in the military in 1981-1983. In addition to his musical career, Ibrahim was also involved in painting. He died of esophageal cancer on 2 July 2019.

== Career ==
=== Yukhu ===
Ibrahim Emin could play the guitar since his childhood. He started his musical career in the early 1980s. He formed the group "Yukhu" in 1988. In addition to writing the lyrics and composing music of the songs performed by the group, he also played bass guitar in the band. In 1989, Yuxu won the music festival called "Golden Autumn" with the song "Xəzərin Sahilində" (English: On the coast of the Caspian Sea). After a while, French manager Pascal invited to perform in France. At that time, it was not possible to go directly to France, so they decided to go through Turkey. However, for unknown reasons, they were unable to travel to France and had to stay and perform in Turkey. Shortly after performing in Turkey, the group began to be recognized. He released three albums in Turkey: "Xəzərin Sahilində" (English: On the coast of the Caspian Sea; 1993), "Sumgayit" (1994), "Ölümə çarə yox" (English: There is no cure for death; 2001). Earthquake occurred in Turkey caused stagnation in the music sector. As a result, the band "Yukhu" could not perform for a long time, and the members of the group began to engage in different activities.

=== Sirr ===
Later, Ibrahim Emin returned to Baku in 2003 and formed the band "Sirr" in Sumgayit in 2004. The album called "Yoruldum" (English: I'm Tired) was released by the group in 2014.

== Quotations ==
"As teenagers, we listened to Deep Purple and Led Zeppelin on BBC radio, and then they became a school for us. We were inspired by their music, and we started playing rock. Then, we formed our group. We recorded the song "Xəzərin Sahilində" (English: On the coast of the Caspian Sea). The lyrics belonged to my father, I changed some words and we sang the song. A year later, we won the music festival called "Golden Autumn" with this song, and it all started with that."

"Those who know me well are aware of that I always say I will never change rock. I feel rock, rock is the music of freedom, rebellion. It is my music."

== See also ==
- Yukhu (band)
