= A Reason to Fight =

Single by Disturbed

from the album Evolution
- Released: September 21, 2018
- Recorded: 2018
- Genre: Rock
- Length: 4:44
- Label: Reprise; Warner Bros.
- Songwriters: Disturbed and Kevin Churko
- Producer: Kevin Churko

Disturbed singles chronology
"Are You Ready" (2018)	"A Reason to Fight" (2018)	"No More" (2019)

Music video
- "A Reason to Fight" on YouTube

"A Reason to Fight" is a song by American heavy metal band Disturbed. It was released as the second single off of their seventh studio album, Evolution. It topped the Billboard Mainstream Rock Songs chart for three weeks and became the band's record-breaking sixth consecutive number one on the chart.

== Background ==
In July 2018, upon the completion of recording the band's seventh studio album Evolution, frontman David Draiman polled fans as to whether they preferred the first single to be a heavy rock song, more akin to most of their back catalogue, or a more mellow ballad song, more comparable to their cover of Simon & Garfunkel's "The Sound of Silence". Out of 80,000 respondents, over 83% chose "heavy" over "ballad". As a result, "Are You Ready" was released as the first single from the album on August 16, 2018.

The album's second single, the ballad "A Reason to Fight", was later released on September 21, 2018. The song was chosen as a single to help represent the band's change in sound for the Evolution album, comparing it to what Metallica's "Black Album" was to the rest of their career up until that point. A music video was also released at the time of the single's release, and was directed by Matt Mahurin, who had previously directed their "The Sound of Silence" music video.

== Themes and composition ==
Lyrically, the song is about battling addiction and depression; the song is meant to provide a positive and hopeful message for those struggling with it. The rough song idea was initially proposed by guitarist Dan Donegan, and supported by Draiman, who felt a personal connection to its message, having seen a number of people close to him struggle with addiction and depression. The song is most commonly referred to as a ballad prominently featuring acoustic guitar. The song's musical direction was inspired by the band's success with their cover of "The Sound of Silence".

== Reception ==
Vince Neilstein of MetalSucks was critical of the song, summing it up as "Draiman whining over top acoustic guitars", but conceded that it was poised to do well at rock radio.

== Personnel ==
Disturbed

- David Draiman – lead vocals
- Dan Donegan – guitars, programming
- John Moyer – bass
- Mike Wengren – drums

== Charts ==
=== Weekly charts ===
Chart (2018–19)	Peak position
Canada Rock (Billboard)	31
Czech Republic Rock (IFPI)	2
Germany Rock Airplay (Official German Charts)	1
Mexico Airplay (Billboard)	41
US Hot Rock & Alternative Songs (Billboard)	24

=== Year-end charts ===
Chart (2019)	Position
US Hot Rock Songs (Billboard)	91
