= Still Here (brand) =

American fashion brand

- Type: Private
- Industry: fashion
- Founded: 2018
- Founder: Sonia Mosseri; Maurice Mosseri
- Headquarters: New York City
- Products: denim jeans
- Website: https://www.stillhere.nyc/

Still Here is an American denim brand founded by Sonia and Maurice Mosseri, based in New York City. The company is known for its vintage-inspired denim jeans. The brand was first popularized by celebrities Hailey Bieber, Emma Chamberlain. Its clothing has since been worn by celebrities including Zoë Kravitz, Jennifer Lawrence, Taylor Swift, Miley Cyrus, Kaia Gerber and Gwyneth Paltrow.

== Overview ==
The brand was founded in 2018 by husband and wife team, Sonia and Maurice Mosseri, high school sweethearts from Brooklyn, New York. Inspired by the fades, rips and patches of her father's childhood jeans, Sonia launched Still Here on Instagram in 2018 with a small line of hand-painted denim.

The vintage style silhouette and hand-painted detail attracted the attention of major luxury department store Barneys New York. Still Here's first season launched with Barneys in 2019 and soon after expanded Internationally with Net-A-Porter.

In mid-2022, Still Here opened their first brick-and-mortar retail location in New York City's Nolita neighbourhood. In April 2022, the company launched a sustainability initiative in the form of Still Here Café. Waste from denim production is recycled into fertilizer used to grow coffee trees. The harvested beans are roasted in small batches and served at the retail store.

In December 2023, Still Here opened its second New York City store on Madison Avenue, on the Upper East Side. In 2024, the brand added "The Vintage Room" within its Madison Avenue location, a curated selection of vintage designer clothing. In September 2025, Still Here opened its third store and first location in Brooklyn, in Williamsburg. On August 13, 2026, Still Here opened its largest store to date in the West Village, Manhattan. The location became the brand's fourth New York City store. In September 2026, Still Here opened its fifth retail location and its first store outside New York City, on Melrose Avenue in West Hollywood, California. The location also includes the brand's largest Vintage Room to date.

== Products ==
Still Here's jeans are made from 100% cotton denim. The brand's best-known style is the "Cool Jean", a low-rise drawstring jean constructed without a waistband. Fashion publications identified Still Here's Cool Jean as part of the drawstring denim trend, with Who What Wear describing Still Here as one of the brands driving the style. The design was later expanded into a shorts version.

The Sport Jean sold out immediately following its release in July 2025. It later received additional media attention after being worn by Zoë Kravitz.

In 2024, Still Here introduced Colors, a dressing system of wardrobe basics beginning with a cotton T-shirt. The collection was released in chapters and later expanded with additional pieces, including sweatshirts, designed to pair with the brand's denim.

Beyond denim, Still Here has expanded into ready-to-wear, including T-shirts, sweaters, jackets, and leather and suede garments.
