= Gaeleri =

Swedish hard rock band

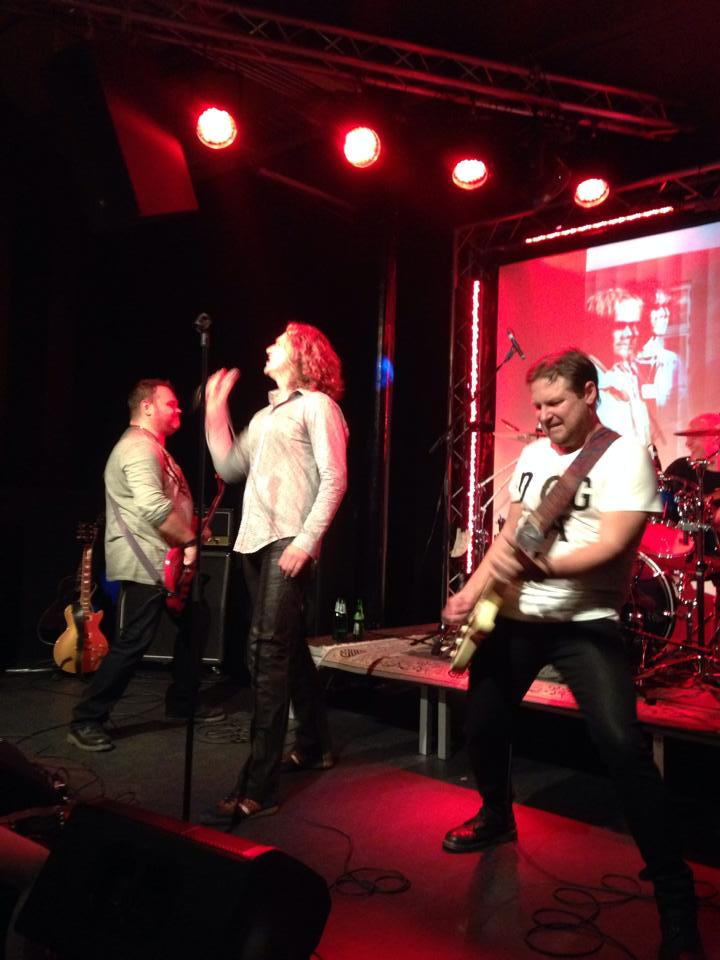
- Gaeleri in Helsingborg, Sweden 2014

Background information
- Origin: Helsingborg, Sweden
- Genres: Rock; Hard rock; Melodic rock; AOR
- Years active: 1992–2005, 2012–present
- Labels: Dream Circle Records, Kick Music, TBM Records
- Members: Anders Vidhav, Niklas Rollgard, Jonas Andersson, Patrik Borgkvist
- Website: gaeleri.com

Gaeleri is a Swedish hard rock band from Helsingborg. The band was formed in 1992 when the remains of Seventeen found a new singer in Anders Vidhav (Bengtsson). Their ability to mix a hard and heavy pounding background with melodic colourful acoustic sound creates the unique sound that has always been the trade mark of the band. The band has between 1992 and 2024 released four full-length albums, one double-single and six singles and can be found on several hard rock compilations.

== History ==
=== The '90s - taking off ===
The band was formed in November 1992 when the remaining three quarters of the band 17 – Seventeen, Niklas Rollgard, Jonas Andersson (Scratch, Unameous) and Patrik Borgkvist (Anette Olzen) joined forces with Anders Vidhav (Båga Biit, Derringer, Pudelsi). The band got a flying start and they soon signed a record deal with the German label Inline Music along with a publishing deal with Warner/Chappell Music. During spring 1993 the band was busy writing song for their debut album, which was recorded already during summer the same year in Delta Studios, Wilster, Germany, with Mike Bettison as producer.

Due to the record company having financial problems, the release was postponed numerous times and in 1994, after the managing director had emptied the company of all its funds, the label finally went bankrupt. The year after, Ole Bergfleth of the German label Dream Circle Records heard the recordings by chance and decided to acquire the rights and in 1996 Gaeleri's self-titled debut album was finally released. The album received great reviews in the press, e.g. 6 out of 7 in the German magazine Metal Hammer, but only a limited first edition reached the market before bad luck once again struck the band - this label went bankrupt as well. This first album is almost impossible to find these days and it has become a collector's item.

Rising from the unfortunate start the band spent most of 1997 touring Scandinavia and started recording their second album Still Here... in Airplay Studios, Stockholm with Uffe "Chris Laney" Larsson and Pontus Norgren as producers and with guest appearance by Thomas Vikström and Lena Vikström on backing vocals. The album was later mixed by Anders "Theo" Theander at Roastinghouse Records, Malmö, and was finally released in 1999 by the Danish label Kick Music (later Sony Music). The band signed a publishing deal with Scandinavian songs for this album. With this album the band showcased their ability to mix acoustic guitars with heavy guitar riffs in strong hooky melodies. With this album the band certainly proved that they were a force to be reckoned with. Still Here... was well received by their fans and received great reviews from the press, e.g. 8,5 out of 10 in HardRoxx online. The song "Crying Out" featured on the compilation A Fist Full of Rock 'n Roll volume 13.

=== The '00s - disbanding ===
The band followed up Still Here... with a tour in Sweden and began writing the songs that would end up on their third album. In spring 2001 the band started recording the album A Brighter Day at Roasting House Studios in Malmö, Sweden, with Anders "Theo" Theander as producer. The album was released by Kick Music in 2002. When the recordings were finished Jonas Andersson decided to leave the band and was later replaced by Jokke Rosén. With their third album the band ventured into a more melodic and AOR oriented style and once again showcased very strong melodies. The album was well received by critics in the European press. The band recorded a video for the song "Blue Town" which was released the same year. The same song also featured on the compilation Munich's Hardest Hits vol 6. In spite of great reviews the album never really took off and all the years of struggling finally took its toll on the members and in 2004 Gaeleri was disbanded.

=== The '10s - an amazing comeback ===
Late 2011, lead singer Anders Vidhav and guitarist Niklas Rollgard decided to get back writing music together again and to invite the other original members of the band to a reunion. After spending 2012 writing songs, the band was finally reunited and the recording of the upcoming album Gates of Rome started late 2013.

The album was recorded in Ladahland studios Helsingborg, Sweden, with Jokke Petterson as co-producer and engineer. The final mixing was done by Anders "Theo" Theander at Roastinghouse Studios, Malmö, Sweden. All songs on the album are published by Roastinghouse/BMG Chrysalis. The album was released worldwide in September–October 2014 by the Swedish label TBM Records.

=== The '20s - change of sound ===
Celebrating the band's 30th anniversary, two new songs was release 2022 as a double single called xXx - this time with a more hard-hitting sound. The band again collaborated with Chris Laney, with whom they worked already on their second album Still Here.... The result was highly appreciated by the fans giving fuel to the band to continue writing songs.

To follow up the 2022 release the band decided to record a five-track EP to be released track by track during the second half of 2024. The first song out was "Loving You Is Killing Me", a hard hitting tune released in July. The second song, "Play Dead" was released in September and for the first time the band recorded and released a song written and performed by another artist. The song "Play Dead" was originally recorded by the amazing artist Björk and is a song that has been with the band for many years and it was a part of the bands live set during the late 1990s. The third song, "Two Hearts" released October 30th, is a return to the classical [gaeleri]-vibe, a heavy yet smooth ballad built on a solid foundation, backing up a tremendous vocal performance and a great chorus.

The band has announced that the following two songs will be "You Got Me" and "Superstar". Release dates are yet to be decided.

== Current members ==
- Anders Vidhav (Bengtsson) - vocals (1992–present)
- Niklas Rollgard - guitar (1992–present)
- Jonas Andersson - bass (1992–2002, 2012–present)
- Patrik Borgkvist - drums (1992–present)

== Former members ==
- Jokke Rosén - bass (2002–2004)

== Discography ==
=== Albums ===
- Gallery (1996)
- Still Here... (1999)
- A Brighter Day (2002)
- Gates of Rome (2014)
- xXx (2022)

=== Singles ===
- "Maybe my Eyes" (promo single) (2000)
- "Welcome To Judgement Day" (2022)
- "Two Wrongs Won't Make It Right" (2022)
- "Loving You Is Killing Me" (2024)
- "Play Dead" (2024)
- "Two Hearts" (2024)
- "You Got Me" (2024)

=== Compilations ===
- Export Music Catalogue - featuring "Maybe My Eyes" (1999)
- Swedish Artists - featuring "Crying Out" (2000)
- Scandinavian Artists - featuring "A Brighter Day" (2001)
- A Fist Full Of Rock 'n Roll, volume 13 - featuring "Crying Out" (2003)
- Munich's Hardest Hits, volume 6 - featuring "Blue Town" (2004)

=== Other projects ===
- He's a man - together with Tina Stenberg (2002)
- Where is the Fire - Various Artists - United (2005)
