= Immortalized (song) =

Promotional single by Disturbed

from the album Immortalized
- Released: June 29, 2015
- Studio: The Hideout Recording Studio, Las Vegas
- Genre: Heavy metal; alternative metal
- Length: 4:17
- Label: Reprise
- Songwriters: Kevin Churko; Dan Donegan; Mike Wengren; David Draiman
- Producer: Kevin Churko

"Immortalized" is a song by American heavy metal band Disturbed, from their sixth studio album, Immortalized. It was released on June 29, 2015, as a promotional single for the album. The song was also made available as a downloadable content for the video game, Rock Band 4, on January 12, 2016.

== Track listing ==
Digital download single
No.	Title	Length
1.	"Immortalized"	4:17
Total length:		4:17

== Personnel ==
- David Draiman – lead vocals, background vocals
- Dan Donegan – all guitars, Ebow, keyboards, bass, background vocals
- Mike Wengren – drums, percussion, background vocals
- Kevin Churko – producer, engineer, mixer

== Charts ==
Chart (2015)	Peak position
US Hot Rock & Alternative Songs (Billboard)	36

== Certifications ==
Region	Certification	Certified units/sales
Canada (Music Canada)	Gold	40,000^{‡}
United States (RIAA)	Gold	500,000^{‡}
^{‡} Sales+streaming figures based on certification alone.
