= Joacim Cans =

Swedish singer

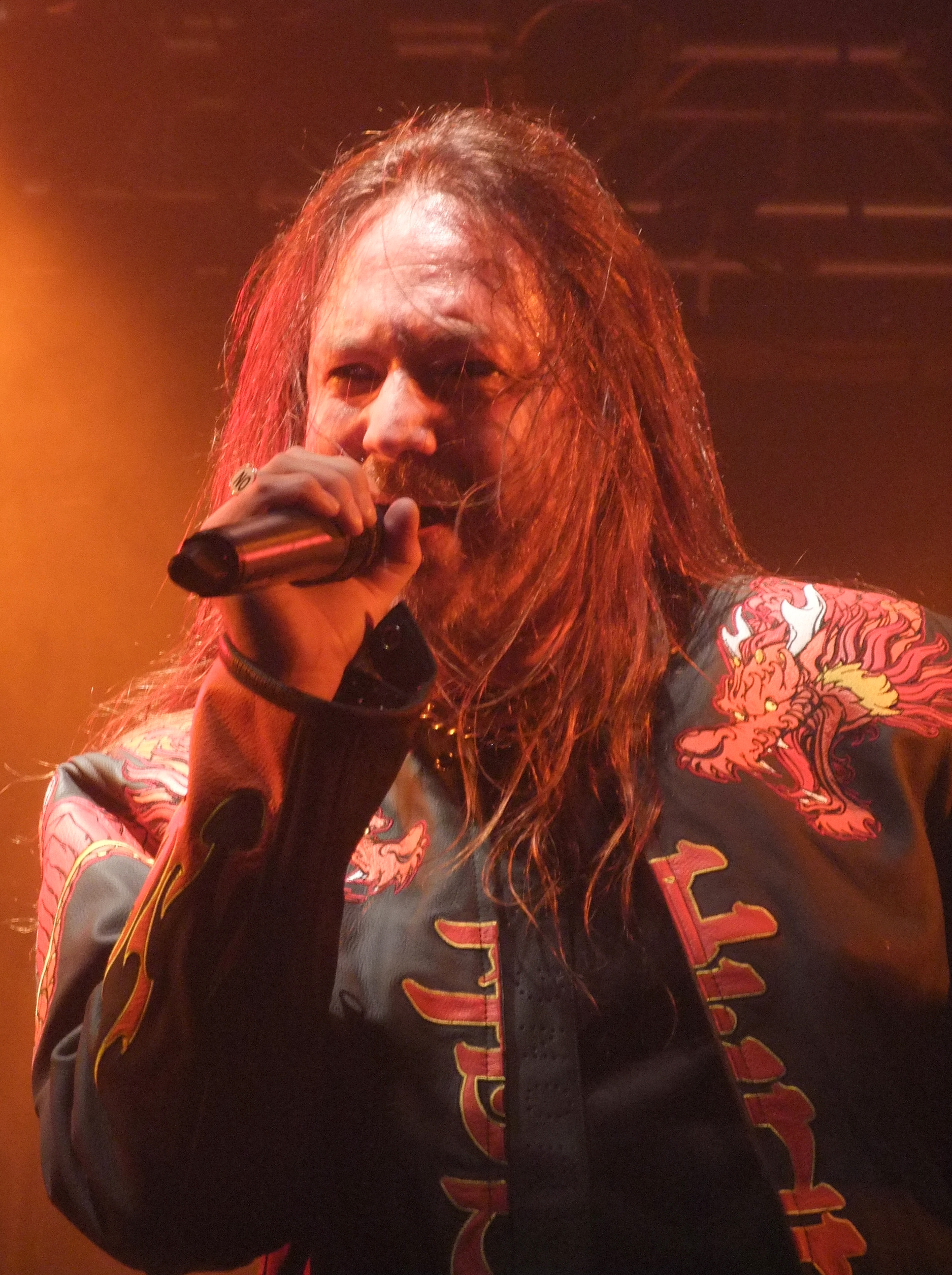
- Cans performing in 2010

Background information
- Born: Anders Joacim Cans; 19 February 1970 (age 55); Mora, Sweden
- Genres: Power metal, heavy metal
- Occupations: Singer, songwriter
- Years active: 1991–present
- Member of: HammerFall
- Formerly of: Warlord, Highlander, Mrs. Hippie

Joacim Cans (born 19 February 1970) is a Swedish singer, best known as the lead vocalist of power metal band HammerFall. He is the only member aside from founder and guitarist Oscar Dronjak to appear on all of the band's albums.

Cans attended the Musicians Institute in Hollywood, California.

He released his first solo album titled Beyond the Gates in 2004.

Cans participated with a choir team in the Swedish television program Körslaget (the Swedish version of Clash of the Choirs) in 2008. On 10 May his team won the competition.

== Bands ==
Line-up

- Joacim Cans – vocals
- Oscar Dronjak – lead and rhythm guitars
- Pontus Norgren – lead and rhythm guitars
- Fredrik Larsson – bass and backing vocals
- David Wallin – drums

Current bands

- HammerFall
- Cans

Past bands

- Lost Horizon
- Warlord
- Mrs. Hippie

== Discography ==
=== Solo albums ===
Year	Album	Peak positions
Year	Album	DEN
2004	Beyond the Gates	–
2013	Nu kan mörkret falla	20
