= Halford discography =

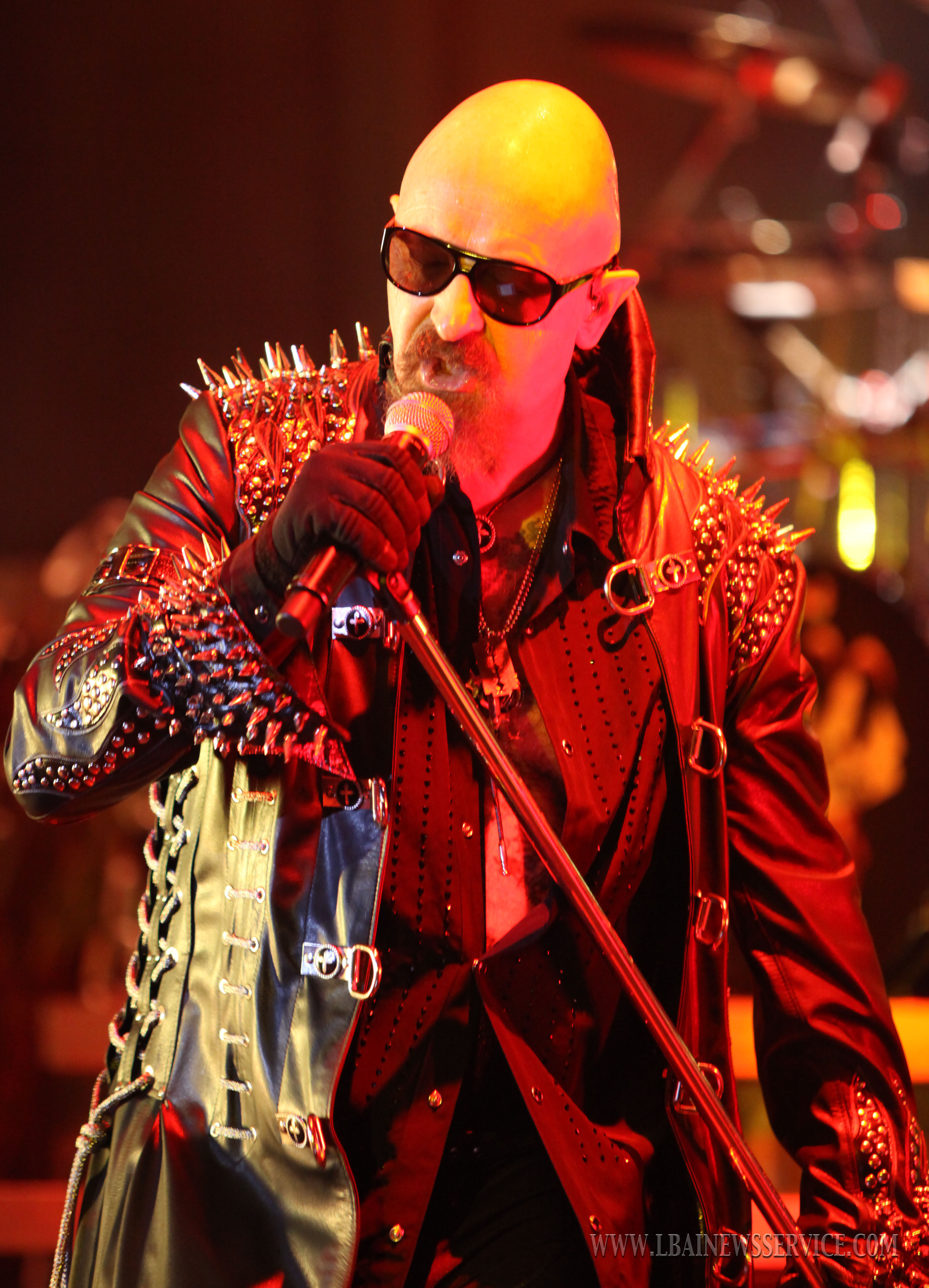
Frontman Rob Halford

The discography for the British-American heavy metal band Halford consists of five studio albums, five live albums, one compilation album, two extended plays, eight singles, three video albums and six music videos. They have been active from 1999 until present day.

== Albums ==
=== Studio albums ===
Title	Album details	Peak chart positions								Sales
Title	Album details	USA	JPN	SWE	GER	FRA	FIN	AUT	UK	Sales
Resurrection	Released: August 8, 2000; Label: Metal God, Metal-is; Formats: CD, digital download	140	9	21	—	—	—	42	128	US: 60,000+
Crucible	Released: June 25, 2002; Label: Metal God, Metal-is; Formats: CD, digital download	144	24	—	—	100	31	—	—	US: 15,549+
Halford III: Winter Songs	Released: October 27, 2009; Label: Metal God; Formats: CD, digital download	—	—	—	—	—	—	—	—	US: 1,400+
Halford IV: Made of Metal	Released: September 27, 2010; Label: Metal God; Formats: CD, digital download	160	81	46	80	—	—	—	—	US: 3,100+
Celestial	Released: October 18, 2019; Label: Sony Legacy; Formats: CD, vinyl, digital download, streaming	26	_	_	92	_	_	_	15	_
"—" denotes a recording that did not chart or was not released in that territory.

=== Live albums ===
Title	Album details	Peak chart positions			Sales
Title	Album details	JPN	SWE	GER	Sales
Live Insurrection	Released: March 28, 2001; Label: Metal God, Metal-is; Formats: CD	38	57	52	US: 25,000+
Live – Disney House of Blues Concert	Released: February 10, 2004; Label: Metal God; Formats: CD	—	—	—	
Live in Anaheim (Original Soundtrack)	Released: June 22, 2010; Label: Metal God; Formats: CD	—	—	—	
Live at Saitama Super Arena (Original Soundtrack)	Released: November 21, 2011; Label: Metal God; Formats: CD, digital download	—	—	—	
Live in London	Released: 2012; Label: Metal God; Formats: CD	—	—	—	
"—" denotes a recording that did not chart or was not released in that territory.

=== Compilation albums ===
Title	Album details	Peak chart positions
Title	Album details	JPN
Metal God Essentials, Vol. 1	Released: June 11, 2007; Label: Metal God; Formats: CD, digital download	108

== Extended plays ==
Title	Details	Peak chart positions
Title	Details	JPN
Fourging the Furnace	Released: January 22, 2003; Label: JVC; Formats: CD	264
Silent Screams - The Singles	Released: November 27, 2006; Label: Metal God; Formats: CD, digital download	—
"—" denotes a recording that did not chart or was not released in that territory.

== Singles ==
Year	Title	Album
2000	Night Fall	Resurrection
2000	Resurrection	Resurrection
2006	Forgotten Generation	Metal God Essentials, Vol. 1
2009	Get Into the Spirit	Halford III: Winter Songs
2009	Christmas For Everyone	Halford III: Winter Songs
2009	Oh Come O Come Emanuel	Halford III: Winter Songs
2010	The Mower	non-album single
2010	Made of Metal	Halford IV: Made of Metal

== Video albums ==
Title	Album details	Peak chart positions
Title	Album details	SWE
Live at Rock in Rio III	Released: October 13, 2008; Label: Metal God; Formats: DVD	—
Live in Anaheim	Released: August 24, 2010; Label: Metal God; Formats: DVD	—
Live at Saitama Super Arena	Released: October 10, 2011; Label: Metal God; Formats: DVD	6
"—" denotes a recording that did not chart or was not released in that territory.

== Music videos ==
Year	Title	Director	Album
2000	"Made In Hell"	—	Resurrection
2002	"Betrayal"	Christoffer Salzgeber	Crucible
2006	"Forgotten Generation"	—	Metal God Essentials, Vol. 1
2009	"Get Into The Spirit"	—	Halford III: Winter Songs
2010	"Made Of Metal"	Dean Wright	Halford IV: Made of Metal
2010	"Like There's No Tomorrow"	—	Halford IV: Made of Metal
