= Tom Chase =

American gay pornographic actor

- Born: March 6, 1965 (age 60)
- Years active: 1996–2004; 2006–2009; 2025–present
- Known for: Gay pornographic film actor
- Notable work: California Kings
- Height: 5 ft 9 in (1.75 m)

Tom Chase (born March 6, 1965) is an American gay pornographic film actor. He began his career in pornography in the 1996 film Backwoods released by Falcon Studios, and later became the studio's first lifetime exclusive model. Later in his career, he appeared in films released by Colt Studios.

== Biography ==
Chase was raised in Highland Park, Texas. At the age of 30, he was inspired by the 1993 pornographic film On the Mark to enter the adult film industry, and submitted photographs of himself to the film's producers at Falcon Studios. He was cast in his first adult film, 1996's Backwoods, a week after being interviewed by Falcon, and relocated from Boston to San Francisco.

At Falcon, Chase would become emblematic of what Claude J. Summers' The Queer Encyclopedia of Film and Television describes as "the new wave of gay porn stars in the new millennium: masculine and muscular, sexually versatile, and confidently gay," and would become the studio's first lifetime exclusive model. He would become known for his dominant performances and his exceptionally large endowment, though Chase has described himself as "the Wally Cleaver of porn" in reference to erotica initially not coming naturally to him. He frequently performed as a top, though his bottoming debut in 1997's California Kings would win him a GayVN Award and a Gay Erotic Video Award.

Chase would work frequently with directors John Rutherford and Chi Chi Larue at Falcon, and would appear in the Larue-directed music video for "I Am a Pig" by 2wo, a side project of Judas Priest lead singer Rob Halford. Chase was romantically involved with the adult film actor Joe Cade; they had a commitment ceremony in 1998, but later separated amicably. In 2004, Chase was inducted into the GayVN Hall of Fame, and announced his retirement from the adult entertainment industry in his acceptance speech. He moved to Granbury, Texas and later Dallas before returning to the adult entertainment industry in 2006 as a model for Colt Studios, where he appeared in films with a more hirsute and bear-like appearance.

In 2010, Chase again retired from pornography; his final credited adult film was The Big One, released in 2009 for the now-defunct gay pornography studio Butch Bear. He was interviewed for Seed Money: The Chuck Holmes Story, a 2015 documentary about Falcon Studios founder Chuck Holmes. Chase returned to gay pornography in 2025 after appearing in a scene with Johnny Hazzard, and subsequently launched an OnlyFans account.

== Awards ==
Year	Nominated work	Category	Award	Result	Notes	Ref.
1997	—N/a	Best Actor	Men in Video Awards	Won		
1997	—N/a	Best Top	Gay Erotic Video Awards	Nominated		
1998	California Kings	Best Erotic Scene	Gay Erotic Video Awards	Won	With Mike Branson.	
1998	California Kings	Best Sex Scene	GayVN Awards	Won	With Mike Branson.	
2000	—N/a	Best Top	Men in Video Awards	Won		
2000	—N/a	Hottest Cock	Men in Video Awards	Won		
2004	—N/a	GayVN Hall of Fame	GayVN Awards	Inducted		
2008	Waterbucks 2	Best Duo	Kiwi Awards	Won	With Skye Woods.	
