= Patrick Lachman =

American musician

- Born: March 31, 1970 (age 56)
- Origin: Portland, Oregon, U.S.
- Genres: Heavy metal; groove metal
- Occupation: Musician
- Instruments: Guitar; vocals
- Years active: 1987–present
- Member of: Diesel Machine
- Formerly of: Damageplan; Halford; The Mercy Clinic; Burn It All

Patrick "Pat" Lachman (born March 31, 1970) is an American heavy metal guitarist and vocalist, best known as the lead vocalist of Damageplan. He has also played guitar for Halford, Killswitch Engage, The Mercy Clinic and Burn It All. He currently performs with Diesel Machine.

== Biography ==
Portland, Oregon native Lachman started playing guitar at age 12. He was a short-lived member of Dr. Mastermind, featuring former Wild Dogs vocalist Matt McCourt, before joining his brother, vocalist Tim Lachman, in another local band, Gargoyle, in 1988. Gargoyle would move to Los Angeles in 1990 where the band morphed into State of the Art, recording an acclaimed three-song demo before disbanding in 1993. The Lachman brothers next hooked up with Canada native Shane Gaalaas, then the drummer for Swedish guitarist Yngwie Malmsteen, and recorded another demo under the name Eleventh Hour. In 1996, Lachman and Gaalaas teamed up with former Last Rites and World in Pain members A.J. Cavalier (later to join SOiL) and Jeff Mohr to form Diesel and cut a six-song demo. Parting ways with Mohr and adding Rich Gonzales, formerly with Recipients of Death, on bass, the band would change their name to Diesel Machine in time for the release of their debut album, Torture Test, in 2000. By then, Lachman had already been picked as one of the guitar players for Halford, the solo band of Judas Priest vocalist Rob Halford.

With Halford, Lachman co-wrote and recorded Resurrection (2000), Live Insurrection (2001), and another studio album, Crucible (2002). He also collaborated with Tommy Victor of Prong on the song "Initiation" which appeared on the band's 2002 100% Live album and was re-recorded as "Embrace the Depth" for Scorpio Rising. 2003 saw the release of a Halford EP titled Fourging the Furnace, released in Japan only.

Lachman had already left the Halford band in November 2002 to join former Pantera guitarist "Dimebag Darrell" Abbott and his brother, drummer Vinnie Paul Abbott, in a new band called Damageplan as their vocalist. Their debut album, New Found Power, was released in 2004; in addition, the song "Ashes to Ashes", featuring Jerry Cantrell of Alice in Chains, appeared on The Punisher soundtrack. The band had recorded several songs for a second album, however, on December 8, 2004, during a Damageplan show at the Alrosa Villa in Columbus, Ohio, Darrell was fatally shot on stage by 25-year-old mentally ill ex-Marine Nathan Gale, who was shot and killed by police minutes later.

After the untimely demise of Damageplan, Lachman put together a new band called The Mercy Clinic in 2005 with guitarists Brian Harrah (Professional Murder Music) and Josh Stinson (Drist), bassist Steed Najera (Triple Seven), and drummer Bevan Davies (Danzig, Comes with the Fall, Jerry Cantrell). Over the course of the next couple of years, the group would write and demo upwards of 20 songs and played frequent shows in the Los Angeles area but ultimately failed to land a record deal. Subsequently, the project was put on hold. On In February 2005, Lachman performed with the surviving members of Alice in Chains at a benefit for tsunami relief in Seattle, Washington, filling in for their late lead singer Layne Staley, along with fellow singers Maynard James Keenan (Tool), Wes Scantlin (Puddle of Mudd), and Ann Wilson (Heart).

Lachman filled in for Killswitch Engage's guitarist Adam Dutkiewicz on the band's North American tour in early 2007. He also filled in for Dutkiewicz at Download Festival 2007. In 2008, Lachman began working with Raymond Herrera and Christian Olde Wolbers formerly of Fear Factory under the name Burn It All.

On April 1, 2019, Lachman and Diesel Machine released "Shut It", their first new song in nearly two decades, and announced a tentative fall 2019 release for their long in the works sophomore album, Evolve. The album was finally released on August 21, 2020, through German company Metalville.

On April 30, 2021, Cosmosquad & The Jasonauts released a digital single of "A Jam For Jason MMXXI" on Bandcamp to raise funds for ALS stricken musician Jason Becker, with Lachman contributing lead guitars alongside Jeff Kollman, Chris Poland, Vinnie Moore, and Steve Morse. Lachman had recorded his parts 20 years earlier but this particular version of the track was never released and had only recently been re-discovered.

== Discography ==
=== Halford ===
- Resurrection (2000)
- Live Insurrection (2001)
- Crucible (2002)
- Fourging the Furnace EP (2003)
- Metal God Essentials, Vol. 1 (2006)
- Halford: Live at Rock in Rio III DVD (2008)

=== Diesel Machine ===
- Torture Test (2000)
- Evolve (2020)

=== Damageplan ===
- New Found Power (2004)

=== The Mercy Clinic ===
- The Mercy Clinic demos (2005, 2006)

=== Cosmosquad & The Jasonauts ===
- A Jam for Jason MMXXI digital single (2021)

=== Compilations and soundtracks ===
- Overload – A Tribute to Metallica (1998)

with Diesel Machine – The Thing That Should Not Be

- A Call to Irons: A Tribute to Iron Maiden Volume 2 (1999)

with Diesel Machine – Children of the Damned

- Devilswork: A Tribute to Ministry (2000)

with Diesel Machine – Supermanic Soul

- Southern Death – Tribute to Pantera (2000)

with Diesel Machine – Primal Concrete Sledge

- Slave to the Power – The Iron Maiden Tribute (2000)

with Eleventh Hour – Alexander the Great
with Error 7 – Stranger in a Strange Land

- The Punisher OST (2004)

with Damageplan – Ashes to Ashes (featuring Jerry Cantrell)
