= Voyeurs (album) =

1998 studio album by Two

Studio album by Two
- Released: March 10, 1998
- Studio: The Factory, Vancouver, British Columbia; The Warehouse, Vancouver, British Columbia
- Genre: Industrial metal
- Length: 46:39
- Label: Nothing
- Producer: Bob Marlette; Dave Ogilvie

Singles from Voyeurs
- 1. "I Am a Pig" Released: February 20, 1998; 2. "Deep in the Ground" Released: 1998

Rob Halford chronology
A Small Deadly Space (1995)	Voyeurs (1998)	Resurrection (2000)

Professional ratings
Review scores
Source	Rating
AllMusic	3/5 stars
Collector's Guide to Heavy Metal	4/10

Voyeurs is the only album by Two, a musical collaboration between vocalist Rob Halford (of Judas Priest) and guitarist John 5 (of Red Square Black, Marilyn Manson and Rob Zombie). Nine Inch Nails' Trent Reznor receives executive-producer credit, with the actual production duties being handled by Bob Marlette and Skinny Puppy's Dave Ogilvie. Voyeurs features Halford's distinctive vocals in an industrial metal context similar to other work by John 5, Reznor and Ogilvie's.

The so-called "pre-Reznor Mixes" of Voyeurs were made available as a free download at Rob Halford's official website in 2002. The download package included "Shout" and "Scream", which remain unreleased. Also included was a demo of "Silent Screams" which was later recorded for Halford's Resurrection. The album was unsuccessful in sales. The album was since made available for streaming through Metal God Entertainment, with licenses to Sony Music Entertainment.

Halford expressed interest in releasing the early demos from the album, which he described as being "tougher and edgier" than the final album.

== Track listing ==
All tracks are written by Rob Halford, John Lowery, and Bob Marlette, except where noted.

No.	Title	Length
1.	"I Am a Pig"	3:37
2.	"Stutter Kiss"	4:32
3.	"Water's Leaking"	3:52
4.	"My Ceiling's Low" (Halford, Marlette)	3:35
5.	"Leave Me Alone" (Halford, Marlette)	4:31
6.	"If"	5:03
7.	"Deep in the Ground"	5:15
8.	"Hey, Sha La La"	4:22
9.	"Wake Up"	3:32
10.	"Gimp"	3:42
11.	"Bed of Rust"	4:32
12.	"In My Head" (Japanese bonus track)	4:05

== Videography ==
Halford hired porn director Chi Chi LaRue to direct the video for the first single I Am a Pig. This video featured grainy S&M scenes of the band and various porn stars, including a few brief glimpses of Janine Lindemulder, in a sex dungeon. It also incorporates some of the album's artwork into the concept. It was not widely shown for its content, but was not banned. "Deep in the Ground" was released as the second and last single but did not chart or feature a video.

== Personnel ==
- Rob Halford – vocals
- John Lowery – guitars, bass
- Bob Marlette – keyboards, drum programming, bass
- Phil Western – keyboards, drum programming
- Anthony "Fu" Valcic – keyboards, drum programming

Production

- Executive producer – Trent Reznor
- Produced by Bob Marlette, with additional production by Dave "Rave" Ogilvie
- Engineered by Marlette and Ogilvie
- Mixed by Ogilvie, assisted by Gary Winger and Dean Maher
- Mastered by Bob Ludwig
- Photography by John Eder and Jana Leön
- Design and digital manipulation by P. R. Brown
- Cover concept by John Baxter, Brown, and Eder

== Charts ==
Chart (1998)	Peak position
German Albums (Offizielle Top 100)	81
US Billboard 200	176
