= I Am a Pig =

Single by 2wo

from the album Voyeurs
- Released: February 20, 1998
- Genre: Industrial metal
- Length: 3:35
- Label: Nothing
- Songwriter(s): Rob Halford; John Lowery; Bob Marlette
- Producer(s): Bob Marlette; Dave "Rave" Ogilvie

2wo singles chronology
"I Am a Pig" (1998)	"Deep in the Ground" (1998)

"I Am a Pig" is a song by American industrial metal band 2wo. The song was released as the lead single from the band's only album, Voyeurs.

== Music video ==
A music video was produced for the song, being directed by porn director Chi Chi LaRue. The video takes place in a brothel and features grainy S&M scenes with several people in leather–clad outfits. The video features various porn stars, including Janine Lindemulder and Tom Chase. The video ends with Rob Halford in a pose similar to the one on the album's cover, with the word Voyeurs appearing over his face. The video was not widely shown due to its content, but it was not banned. The video is briefly featured in the 1999 black comedy film Idle Hands.

== Track listing ==
No.	Title	Length
1.	"I Am a Pig"	3:35
2.	"Water's Leaking"	3:53

== Personnel ==
- Rob Halford – vocals
- John Lowery – guitar, bass
- Bob Marlette – keyboards, drum programming, bass
- Phil Western – keyboards, drum programming
- Anthony "Fu" Valcic – keyboards, drum programming

== Charts ==
Chart (1998)	Peak position
US Mainstream Rock (Billboard)	22
