= Metal God Essentials, Vol. 1 =

Metal God Essentials Vol. 1

Compilation album by Halford
- Released: June 11, 2007
- Genre: Heavy metal
- Length: 66:06
- Label: Metal God Entertainment
- Producer: Roy Z

Halford chronology
Crucible (2002)	Metal God Essentials Vol. 1 (2007)	Halford III: Winter Songs (2009)

Metal God Essentials Vol. 1 is a compilation album released by American heavy metal band Halford in 2007. It was released as a standard CD with a bonus DVD, and also as a limited edition (5000 copies) Digipak including a bonus remix CD and Rob Halford's autograph.

== Track listing ==
No.	Title	Writer(s)	Original release	Length
1.	"Resurrection"	Rob Halford, Patrick Lachman, John Baxter, Roy Z	Resurrection	3:58
2.	"Made in Hell"	Halford, Z, Baxter	Resurrection	4:14
3.	"Screaming in the Dark"	Halford, Lachman, Z, Baxter	Live Insurrection	3:40
4.	"Golgotha"	Halford, Mike Chlasciak, Baxter	Crucible	4:25
5.	"Silent Screams – 1999 Demo"	Halford, Bob Marlette	Silent Screams (The Singles)	7:16
6.	"Crystal"	Halford, Z, Baxter	Crucible	4:50
7.	"Into the Pit" (demo, performed by Fight)	Halford	K5 – The War of Words Demos	4:37
8.	"Nailed to the Gun" (demo, performed by Fight)	Halford	K5 – The War of Words Demos	3:35
9.	"Slow Down"	Halford, Marlette, Z	Resurrection	4:52
10.	"Locked and Loaded"	Halford, Lachman	Resurrection	3:20
11.	"Forgotten Generation"	Halford, Z, Baxter	new release	4:37
12.	"Drop Out"	Halford, Z, Baxter	new release	3:41
13.	"War of Words" (demo, performed by Fight)		K5 – The War of Words Demos	4:58
14.	"Sun"	Halford, Z, Baxter	Crucible	3:51
15.	"Trail of Tears"	Halford, Ray Riendeau, Z, Baxter, Chlasciak, Bobby Jarzombek, Lachman	Crucible	4:29
16.	"Redemption European Mix" (hidden bonus remix of "Forgotten Generation")	Halford, Z, Baxter	new release	6:34

Bonus CD
No.	Title	Length
1.	"Hypocrisy U.S. Mix"	4:35
2.	"Vendetta Australia and So.America Mix"	4:08
3.	"Redemption European Mix"	6:36
4.	"Resistance Canadian Mix"	4:52

All bonus CD tracks are remixes of "Forgotten Generation".

Bonus DVD

1. Resurrection – Behind the Scenes
2. Live Insurrection – Behind the Scenes
3. "Made in Hell" (music video)
4. "Betrayal" (music video)
5. "In the Morning" (music video)
6. "Silent Screams" (Live at Rock in Rio III)
7. "Never Satisfied" (Live in Anaheim)
8. "Forgotten Generation" (music video)

== Personnel ==
Halford (tracks 1–6, 9–12, 14 and 15)

- Rob Halford – vocals
- Metal Mike Chlasciak – guitar
- Patrick Lachman – guitar
- Roy Z – guitar
- Ray Riendeau – bass
- Mike Davis – bass (tracks 11–12)
- Bobby Jarzombek – drums

Fight (tracks 7, 8 and 13)

- Rob Halford – vocals
- Brian Tilse – guitar
- Russ Parrish – guitar
- Jay Jay – bass
- Scott Travis – drums

Production

- Produced by Roy Z
- Executive producer – John Baxter
- Tracks 1–3 and 9–10 mixed by Charlie Bauerfiend and Roy Z
- Tracks 4, 6, 11, 12, 14 and 15 mixed by Tue Madsen
- Track 5 mixed by Bob Marlette and Rob Halford
- Tracks 7, 8 and 13 mixed by Roy Z
- Bonus CD remixes by Attie Bauw
- Mastered by Tom Baker
- Graphic direction, web marketing, and design by Attila Juhasz
- Cover illustration and packaging design by Marc Sasso
- Photography by John Eder, Neil Zlozower, Ross Halfin, Greg Kozak, John Baxter, and William Hames
