= Mike Chlasciak =

Polish-American guitarist

"Metal" Mike Chlasciak
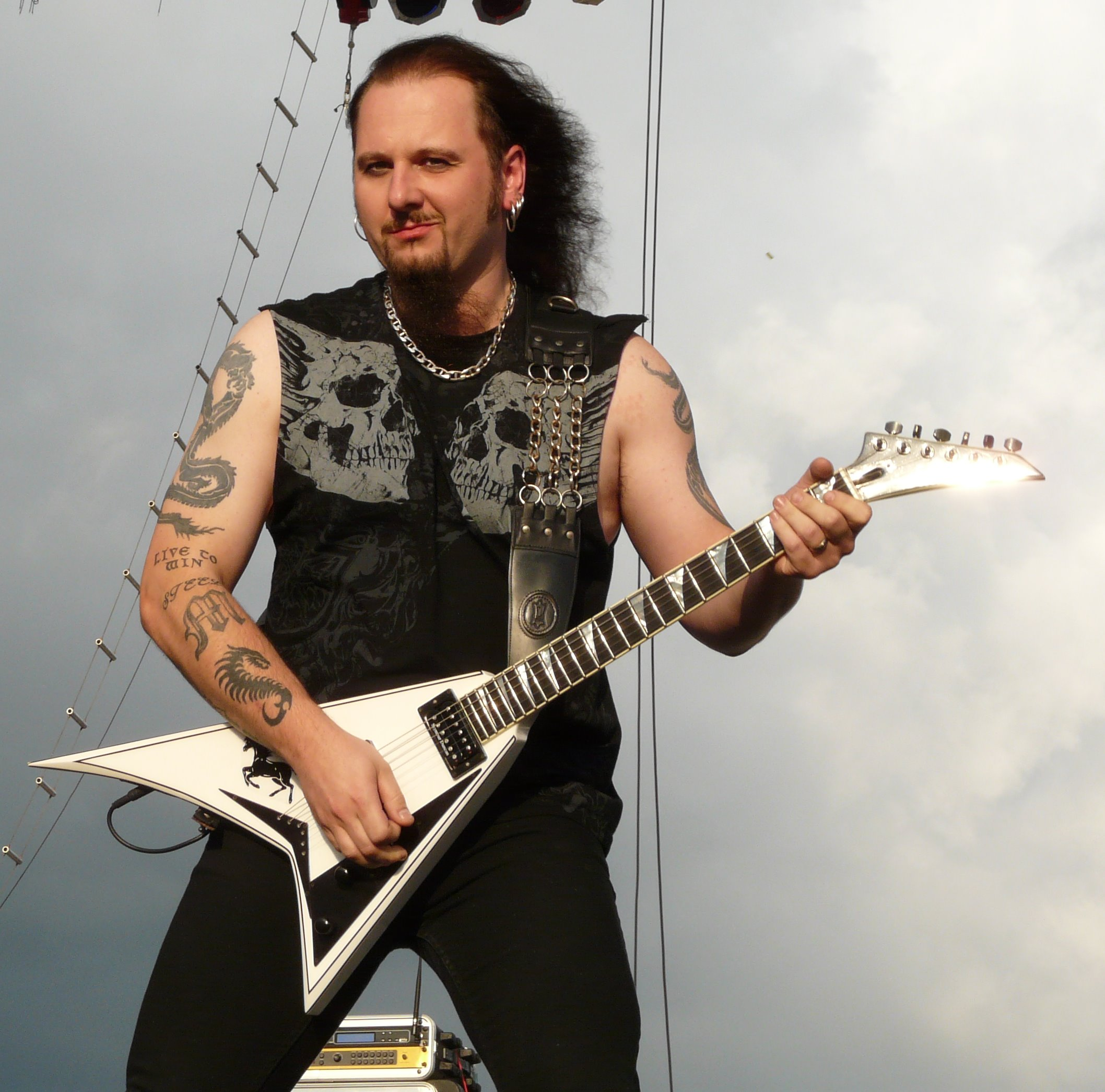
- Chlasciak live with Sebastian Bach in 2008 at the Moondance Jam

Background information
- Also known as: "Metal Mike"
- Born: Michał Chlaściak; December 24, 1971 (age 54); Warsaw, Poland
- Genres: Heavy metal
- Occupation: Guitarist
- Years active: 1988–present
- Website: metalmike.net

"Metal" Mike Chlasciak (born December 24, 1971) is a Polish-American musician, best known as the guitarist for heavy metal band Halford, led by Rob Halford.

== Musical career ==
Chlasciak and Halford have toured the world several times over with the likes of Iron Maiden, Ozzy Osbourne and Mötley Crüe. Chlasciak has additionally toured with Bay Area thrash metal band Testament, Saturday Night Live's comedian Jim Breuer, and recorded and toured with Sebastian Bach. He has additionally shared stages or recordings with Bruce Dickinson of Iron Maiden, Axl Rose of Guns N' Roses, and Geoff Tate of Queensrÿche.

As a solo artist, Chlasciak supported Steve Morse, Yngwie Malmsteen, Ronnie Montrose, Savatage, Primal Fear, and Eric Martin of Mr. Big. Chlasciak's solo band PainmuseuM has toured with Halford, Testament, Amon Amarth and others. Chlasciak's has contributed songs to the Songs from the Garage album from Saturday Night Live alumnus Jim Breuer and has provided lead guitar duties for his band, Jim Breuer and The Loud & Rowdy.

In 2017, Chlasciak put together a new solo band with musicians Marc Lopes (Metal Church, Ross the Boss, Let Us Prey), Mike LePond (Symphony X, Silent Assassins) and Ronnie Lipnicki (Overkill). In 2021 Mike LePond was replaced with bassist Mike Davis (Halford, Dramarama). In 2024, Marc Lopes was replaced with Carlos Zema (Immortal Guardian), who originally sang on Chlasciak’s “The Metalworker” album. The first show of the new 2024 line-up resulted in a Sold-Out show at New Jersey’s popular venue, Dingbatz. Metal Mike’s solo band continues to headline its own shows, small festivals and has supported melodic rockers Dokken at 2019 US East Coast dates.

In 2018, Chlasciak was inducted into the Heavy Metal Hall of Fame alongside Lzzy Hale (Halestorm), Billy Sheehan (Talas, Mr. Big, Sons of Apollo) and Bill Ward of Black Sabbath.

== Other ventures ==
Chlasciak is a scholarship graduate of Berklee College of Music. He also writes his own monthly "Metal for Life" column in Guitar World and often contributes career and music related blogs for guitarworld.com and other publications. Chlasciak released several metal guitar instructional books and DVDs. Chlasciak also owns and oversees Metal Heroes Music Academy. The annual Metal Heroes Summer Collective and Metal Mike's Ultimate Metal Guitar Retreat, which take place in upstate New York's Catskill Mountains, are Metal Heroes' crown jewels. Chlasciak continues to lead workshops and clinics across the US spotlighting heavy metal guitar playing.

== Discography ==
=== As Mike Chlasciak ===
- Territory: Guitar Kill!!! (2000)

=== As Metal Mike Chlasciak ===
- The Spilling (2001)
- This Is War (EP) (2012)
- The Metalworker (2013)
- The Metalworker Demos + 6 (2020)
- The Metal Squire: Early Battles + 4 (2021)

=== With Isolation Chamber ===
- Grind Textural Abstractions (1996)

=== With Halford ===
- Resurrection (2000)
- Live Insurrection (2001)
- Crucible (2002)
- Fourging the Furnace (2003)
- Silent Screams (2006)
- Metal God Essentials, Vol. 1 (2007)
- Halford III - Winter Songs (2009)
- Live in Anaheim – Original soundtrack (2010)
- Halford IV: Made of Metal (2010)
- Live at Saitama Super Arena – Original soundtrack (2011)
- Live in London (2012)
- The Essential Rob Halford (2015)
- Extended Versions (2015)
- The Complete Albums Collection Box Set (2017)

=== With John West ===
- Earthmaker (2002)

=== With Joacim Cans ===
- Beyond the Gates (2004)

=== With Painmuseum ===
- Metal for Life (2005)
- You Have the Right to Remain Violent (2006)

=== With Sebastian Bach ===
- Angel Down (2007)

== Bibliography ==
- Ridiculous Riffs for the Terrifying Guitarist (2007)
- Monster Coordination – Guitar Boot Camp (2007)
- This River Shall Burn (2011)
- Classic Metal Essentials – Download pack (2012)
- Chromaticity - My Best Exercises For Achieving Speed, Coordination & Fluidity (2021)
- Chromaticity 2 - The Ultimate Collection Of Speed, Precision & Stretch Developers (2022)

== Filmography ==
=== With Halford ===
- Live at Rock in Rio (2008)
- Live in Anaheim (2010)
- Live at Saitama Super Arena (2011)

=== With Sebastian Bach ===
- Road Rage (2007)

=== Solo ===
- Metal for Life! (2013)
- 20 Essential Metal Licks (2013)

== Guest appearances ==
=== Recordings ===
- Metal Hall of Fame - Carol Of The Bells (2024)
- Let Us Prey - Let Us Prey (2020)
- Mike LePond - Silent Assassins (2014)
- Iceland - Iceland (2013)
- Sylencer - A Lethal Dose of Truth (2012)
- Ralf Scheepers - Scheepers (2010)
- Michael Vescera - A Sign of Things to Come (2008)
- Delta - Crashbreaker (2008)
- Primal Fear - Metal Is Forever (2006)
- Doctor Butcher - Doctor Butcher (2005)
- Dream Evil - The Book of Heavy Metal (2004)
- Consortium Project III - Terra Incognita (2003)
- Michael Vescera Project - The Altar (2003)
- Primal Fear - Black Sun (2002)
- Tribute to The Priest (2002)
- Tribute to Led Zeppelin - The Music Remains the Same (2002)
- Heavy Metal Geomatrix - Game Soundtrack (2001)
- Tribute to Joe Satriani - Crushing Days (2001)
- Tribute to Jason Becker - Warmth in the Wilderness (2001)
- Tribute to Yngwie Malmsteen - A Guitar Oddysey (2000)
- Metro Playoff Fever (2003)

=== Filmography ===
- Bang Your Head Festival - 10th Anniversary (2006)
- Primal Fear - The History of Fear (2006)
