= Bobby Jarzombek =

American drummer

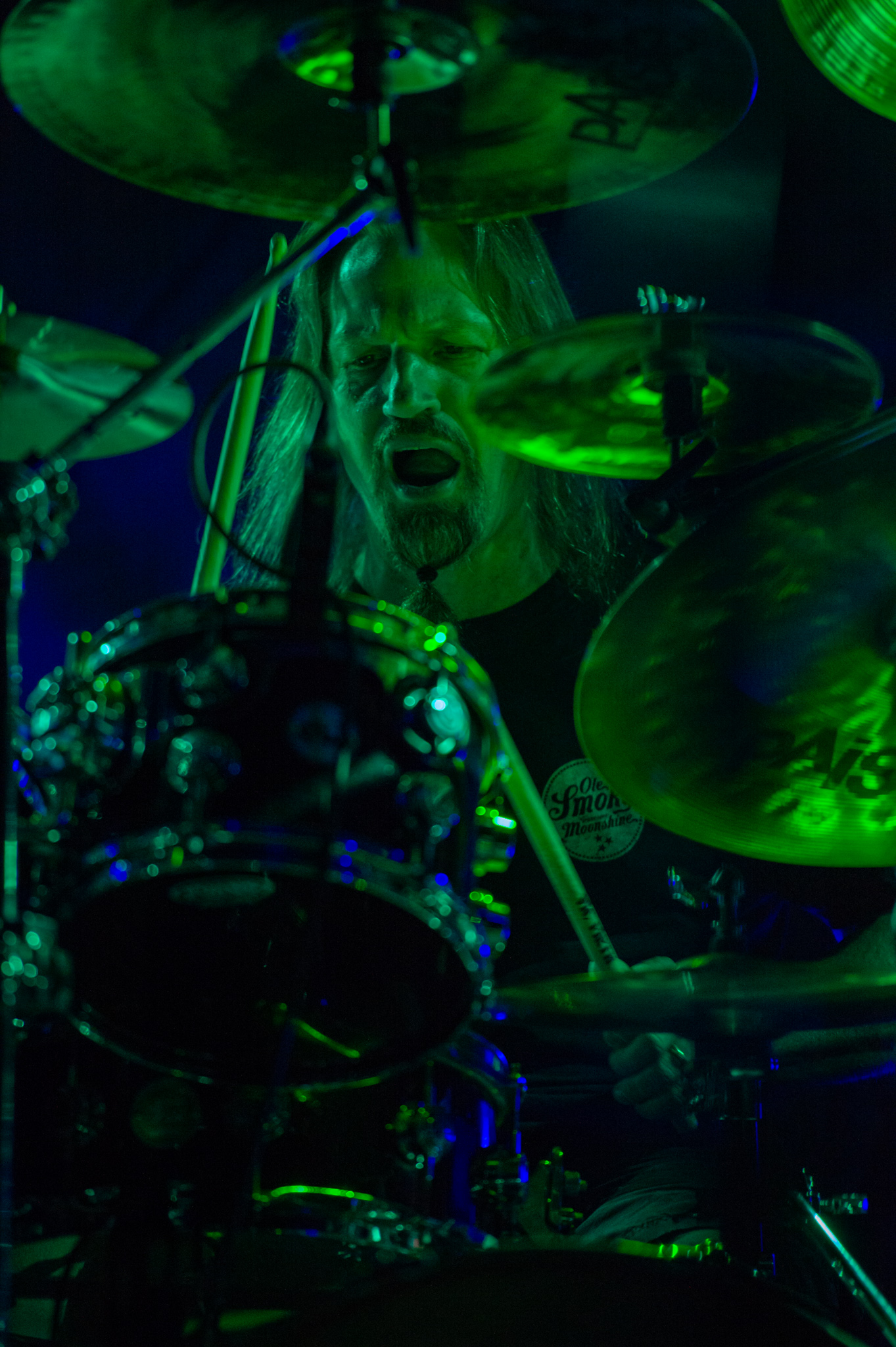
- Jarzombek performing with Fates Warning in 2017

Background information
- Genres: Progressive metal; heavy metal; power metal; hard rock; country
- Occupation: Drummer
- Years active: 1986–present

Bobby Jarzombek is an American musician of Polish and German ancestry who is currently the drummer for country music singer George Strait. Bobby also has been a drummer for Sebastian Bach, and progressive metal band Fates Warning. Guitarist Ron Jarzombek is his younger brother.

He has also recorded and toured extensively with the bands Halford and Riot and worked with Fates Warning offshoot Arch/Matheos, Iced Earth, Rob Rock, John West, Spastic Ink, and Juggernaut, among others. As of August 2021, Jarzombek has been the tour drummer for country artist George Strait.

Jarzombek is noted for, somewhat uniquely, positioning cymbals behind him, usually over his left and right shoulders, for shoulder hits while playing.

== Career ==
Quickly developing into one of the hottest drummers in town, Jarzombek joined local up-and-comers, Juggernaut, with whom he made his official recording debut, aptly titled Baptism Under Fire, in 1986. As a member of Riot, Bobby toured throughout the US, Europe, and Japan and recorded a total of six studio and a pair of live albums, including The Privilege of Power (1990), an eclectic semi-concept album featuring the Tower of Power horns and guest vocals by Joe Lynn Turner, Nightbreaker (1994), and 1998's Shine On!, recorded live in Japan. Bobby took leave from the band early into the Brethren of the Long House sessions but was persuaded to rejoin in time for Inishmore (1997).

In 1993, he also reconnected with his younger brother, noted guitarist Ron Jarzombek of WatchTower fame. Joined by Riot bassist Pete Perez, the duo formed madcap tech/prog metal outfit Spastic Ink whose 'anything goes'-approach owed as much to the spirit of Frank Zappa and cartoon music icon Carl Stalling as it did to the brothers' early prog heroes such as U.K. and Rush. The band went on to release two highly acclaimed albums, Ink Complete (1997) and Ink Compatible (2004). In the fall of 1999, he was asked to submit a package to former Judas Priest vocalist Rob Halford whose new project was deep into the pre-production phase for their debut album. Bobby became the drummer for Halford and has subsequently been part of every recording – including Resurrection (2000), Live Insurrection (2001), Crucible (2002), and the Fourging the Furnace EP (2003) – and tour, highlighted by an appearance in 2001 at the massive Rock in Rio III festival in Brazil in front of a quarter million fans. Halford went on indefinite hiatus when Rob Halford rejoined his former band, Judas Priest, in 2003. Halford would re-active his solo career in 2009 with Halford III: Winter Songs, a heavy metal Christmas album, followed by the release of Halford IV: Made of Metal in the summer of 2010 which also saw the band appear on the main stage at Ozzfest as well as co-headlining the Loud Park festival in Japan. The show was filmed for the 2011 Live at Saitama Super Arena DVD.

In 2004, Jarzombek was asked by future Howard Stern sidekick Richard Christy to take over his drum duties with Iced Earth who were in the middle of their U.S. tour in support of The Glorious Burden. The following year, Bobby recorded Touched by the Crimson King with Iced Earth offshoot Demons and Wizards, and was also approached by former Skid Row vocalist Sebastian Bach who was in need of a touring drummer. With Iced Earth on hold due to guitarist Jon Schaffer's persistent back problems, the Bach gig became permanent. In 2006, Bobby toured worldwide with Bach supporting Guns N' Roses whose frontman Axl Rose put in a guest appearance on Bach's 2007 album, Angel Down. In the summer of 2007, he began his affiliation with long running progressive metal outfit Fates Warning when he was asked to fill in for the band's 2007 Italian 'Evolution Fest' appearance. He was also on board for the European tour later that same year and has continued to be the group's full-time drummer ever since. In 2011, he recorded the Sympathetic Resonance album with Fates Warning offshoot Arch/Matheos, featuring original lead vocalist John Arch.

In May 2008, it was announced that the members of Riot's classic Thundersteel-era line-up - Mark Reale, Tony Moore, Don Van Stavern, and Bobby Jarzombek - would reunite for a new studio album. Initially slated for a late 2009 release, the album, entitled Immortal Soul, eventually surfaced in the fall of 2011. Founding member Mark Reale would pass away only months later from complications due to Crohn's Disease at a San Antonio, Texas hospital. In 2008-2009, Bobby was a session drummer for several vocal tracks of Sega's video game Sonic and the Black Knight. His drumming can be heard on "Through the Fire" and both versions of "With Me", the final battle version and the Crush 40 "Massive Power Mix" exclusive to the original vocal soundtrack: Face to Faith. In October 2010, Bobby was approached by Dream Theater's management about an audition following the departure of Mike Portnoy but decided to pass. Talking to U.K. website Give The Drummer Some! in the fall of 2013, Bobby explained that he turned down the opportunity because he felt it was "not his gig", and that Portnoy would eventually come back in the future.

In early 2011, Platinum Samples issued the Bobby Jarzombek Metal MIDI Groove Library, a multi-format MIDI groove library featuring over 1,670 MIDI files (over 3,430 bars of unquantized grooves) formatted for BFD2, BFD Eco, EZdrummer, EZplayer, Superior Drummer 2.0, Addictive Drums, Cakewalk Session Drummer as well as General MIDI. Bobby's first foray into MIDI samples came in 2007 via Joe Barresi's Evil Drums, a six-DVD set released by Platinum Samples, the second BFD Expansion Pack in the company's 'Master Engineer' series of drum samples featuring the work of multi-platinum award-winning producers and recording engineers. That same year, Bobby also featured on Sebastian Bach's Kicking & Screaming, produced by Bob Marlette and released in the fall of 2011. Bobby's studio debut with Fates Warning, Darkness in a Different Light, was released September 27, 2013, via Inside Out Music. Bobby also joined Transatlantic progressive metal group Zierler, featuring members of Beyond Twilight, Scar Symmetry, Firewind, and Circus Maximus, whose debut album, ESC, was released in October 2015.

Continuing to divide his time between recording and touring with Sebastian Bach and Fates Warning, Bobby featured on Bach's 2014 effort, Give 'Em Hell, and Fates' latest studio offering, Theories of Flight, released on July 1, 2016 as well as the band's 2018 live album, Live Over Europe. He was also one of several current and former Fates Warning members to take part in the recording of the second Arch/Matheos release, Winter Ethereal, which surfaced in the spring of 2019.

Jarzombek has also become involved with the South Texas Legion, an all-star live formation featuring players from notable Texas metal bands such as WatchTower, Helstar, S.A. Slayer, Juggernaut, Militia and Karion, put together for the purpose of celebrating the Texas metal heritage.

On May 18, 2021, Jarzombek announced on his Facebook page that he had joined country music superstar George Strait and his Ace In The Hole band. Jarzombek had been playing with members of the Ace In The Hole band in the Texas Jamm Band for a number of years and continues to perform with them.

=== Drum instructional DVD ===
In 2003, Bobby released 'Performance & Technique', his first ever drum instructional VHS/DVD. It was initially available as a self-released VHS tape but was soon picked up by Warner Bros. Publications and released on DVD with additional content in 2005. It was slightly re-packaged and issued again by Alfred Publishing in 2006.

== Discography ==
=== with Riot ===
- (1988) Thundersteel
- (1990) The Privilege of Power
- (1992) Riot in Japan - Live!! (Japan) / (1999) Live in Japan!! (US)
- (1993) Greatest Hits '78 - '90, aka Star Box (Japan only)
- (1993) Nightbreaker
- (1995) The Brethren of the Long House
- (1997) Angel Eyes EP (Japan only)
- (1997) Inishmore
- (1998) Shine On
- (1999) Sons of Society
- (2011) Immortal Soul
- (2017) Official Bootleg Box Set 1980-1990 Volume 2
- (2019) Archives Volume 3: 1987-1988
- (2019) Archives Volume 4: 1988-1989
- (2019) Live in America: The Official Bootleg Box Set Vol. 3, 1981-1988
- (2020) Rock World: Rare & Unreleased 87-95

=== with Halford ===
- (2000) Resurrection
- (2001) Live Insurrection
- (2002) Crucible
- (2003) Fourging the Furnace EP (Japan only)
- (2006) Metal God Essentials, Vol. 1
- (2008) Live at Rock in Rio III DVD
- (2009) Halford III: Winter Songs
- (2010) Live in Anaheim CD & DVD
- (2010) Halford IV: Made of Metal
- (2011) Live at Saitama Super Arena DVD
- (2012) Live in London
- (2015) The Essential Rob Halford
- (2015) Extended Versions

=== with Fates Warning ===
- (2013) Darkness in a Different Light
- (2016) Theories of Flight
- (2018) Live Over Europe
- (2020) Long Day Good Night

=== with Arch/Matheos ===
- (2011) Sympathetic Resonance
- (2019) Winter Ethereal

=== with Sebastian Bach ===
- (2007) Angel Down
- (2011) Kicking & Screaming
- (2013) ABachalypse Now DVD/CD
- (2014) Give 'Em Hell

=== with Painmuseum ===
- (2004) Metal for Life
- (2006) You Have the Right to Remain Violent EP

=== with Spastic Ink ===
- (1997) Ink Complete
- (2004) Ink Compatible

=== with Juggernaut ===
- (1986) Baptism Under Fire
- (1987) Trouble Within

=== Session work and guest spots ===
- (2002) John West - Earth Maker
- (2005) Demons & Wizards - Touched by the Crimson King
- (2005) Rob Rock - Holy Hell
- (2008) Rob Rock - Garden of Chaos
- (2009) Various - Tales of Knighthood: Sonic and the Black Knight OST
- (2009) Tim 'Ripper' Owens - Play My Game
- (2009) Thomsen - Let's Get Ruthless
- (2009) Ron Jarzombek - PHHHP! Plus
- (2013) Mythodea - Mythodea
- (2014) Thomsen - Unbroken
- (2015) Zierler - ESC

== Accolades ==
Jarzombek was voted '#1 drummer 2000' by the readers of Japanese metal magazine, Burrn!, in recognition of his work on Halford's Resurrection.
