= Angel Down (album) =

Studio album by Sebastian Bach
- Released: November 20, 2007
- Recorded: June/July 2006
- Studio: Sound City Studios (Van Nuys, California)
- Genre: Heavy metal; hard rock
- Length: 54:28
- Label: Merovingian; Get Off My Bach; Caroline; EMI
- Producer: Roy Z

Sebastian Bach chronology
Bach 2: Basics (2001)	Angel Down (2007)	Kicking & Screaming (2011)

Singles from Angel Down
- 1. "Back in the Saddle" Released: 2007; 2. "(Love Is) a Bitchslap" Released: 2007; 3. "By Your Side" Released: 2008; 4. "You Don't Understand" Released: 2008; 5. "Falling into You" Released: 2008

Angel Down is the third solo release and the first studio album by heavy metal singer Sebastian Bach. Released on November 20, 2007, it is the first release to feature all original studio recorded material. It is also Bach's first release since his 2001 release Bach 2: Basics. The album gained attention due to Guns N' Roses lead singer Axl Rose's guest appearance on three tracks and Bach's appearance on MTV's Celebrity Rap Superstar. The front cover art of the album is David Lees's photo for Life magazine of the 1966 Florence flood.

== Reception ==
Professional ratings
Review scores
Source	Rating
About.com	4/5 stars
AllMusic	4/5 stars
Artistdirect	4/5 stars
Cash Box	4/5 stars
Rolling Stone	3/5 stars
Sputnikmusic	3.5/5

In an exclusive preview of the album, Paul Cashmere of Undercover described Angel Down as "The metal album of the year, if not the 21st Century so far."

On October 27, 2007, "Back in the Saddle" was played on the Texas radio station Q94.5. According to the station, the phones rang off the hook when the single was played and it became the station's No. 1 most requested track and also charted at number 4 in Finland, however the album only debuted at No. 191 on the Billboard Top 200 chart, selling 6,400 copies in its first week.

== Track listing ==
No.	Title	Writer(s)	Length
1.	"Angel Down"	Adam Albright, Sebastian Bach	3:48
2.	"You Don't Understand"	Bach, Roy Z	3:06
3.	"Back in the Saddle" (Aerosmith cover; featuring Axl Rose)	Steven Tyler, Joe Perry	4:19
4.	"(Love Is) a Bitchslap" (featuring Axl Rose)	Bach, Z	3:08
5.	"Stuck Inside" (featuring Axl Rose)	Rose, Johnny Chromatic	2:57
6.	"American Metalhead" (Painmuseum cover)	Mike Chlasciak	4:02
7.	"Negative Light"	Bach, Chlasciak, Steve Di Giorgio	4:33
8.	"Live & Die" (Painmuseum cover)	Chlasciak, Tim Clayborne	3:53
9.	"By Your Side"	Bach, Z	5:27
10.	"Our Love Is a Lie"	Bach, Chlasciak, Z	3:20
11.	"Take You Down with Me"	Bach, Di Giorgio	4:37
12.	"Stabbin' Daggers"	Bach, Chromatic, Bobby Jarzombek	3:41
13.	"You Bring Me Down"	Ralph Santolla	3:16
14.	"Falling into You"	Bach, Desmond Child	4:21

=== Limited edition DVD ===
The Angel Down DVD is included on the limited edition of the album and features a documentary titled "Roadrage" made by Sebastian Bach himself and features a close look at the making of the album and backstage vision with the Trailer Park Boys.

The DVD also includes six live performances and a music video.

1. "American Metalhead"
2. "Stuck Inside"
3. "(Love Is) a Bitchslap"
4. "You Don't Understand"
5. "By Your Side"
6. "By Your Side (Acoustic)" (bonus)
7. "(Love Is) a Bitchslap" (music video)

== Personnel ==
- Sebastian Bach – lead vocals
- "Metal" Mike Chlasciak – guitar
- Johnny Chromatic – guitar
- Steve Di Giorgio – bass
- Bobby Jarzombek – drums and percussion

=== Additional personnel ===
- Axl Rose – vocals on "Back in the Saddle"; backup vocals on "(Love Is) a Bitchslap" and "Stuck Inside"; writing credits on "Stuck Inside"
- Adam Albright – guitar on "Angel Down"
- Ed Ross – piano and strings on "By Your Side" and "Falling into You"
- Roy Z – guitar tracks 2, 4, 9, 10

== Charts ==
Chart	Peak position
US Billboard 200	191
US Billboard Heatseekers	1
