= Touched by the Crimson King =

Studio album by Demons & Wizards
- Released: June 27, 2005
- Studio: Morrisound Studios
- Genre: Power metal, progressive metal
- Length: 49:26
- Label: Warner/Chapell & BG Publishing & Platinum Songs Unlimited
- Producer: Jim Morris with Schaffer and Kürsch

Demons & Wizards chronology
Demons & Wizards (2000)	Touched by the Crimson King (2005)	III (2020)

Professional ratings
Review scores
Source	Rating
AllMusic	3.5/5 stars

Touched by the Crimson King is the second album by the power metal supergroup Demons and Wizards, released in June 2005. The album contains a cover of Led Zeppelin's "Immigrant Song". It was also released as a limited edition digipak in Europe with an alternate cover and four bonus tracks on a second disc. For the North American release, all fourteen songs appeared on one disc, which had the limited edition cover in the form of a sleeve around the jewel case.

The album appeared on the American Billboard charts on place 35.

== Track listing ==
All tracks are written by Jon Schaffer and Hansi Kürsch, except where noted.

No.	Title	Writer(s)	Length
1.	"Crimson King"		5:47
2.	"Beneath These Waves"		5:11
3.	"Terror Train"		4:45
4.	"Seize the Day"		5:22
5.	"The Gunslinger"		5:13
6.	"Love's Tragedy Asunder"		5:26
7.	"Wicked Witch"		3:32
8.	"Dorian"		6:36
9.	"Down Where I Am"		4:54
10.	"Immigrant Song"	Jimmy Page, Robert Plant	2:28

Limited edition
No.	Title	Length
11.	"Lunar Lament"	4:04
12.	"Wicked Witch" (slow version)	3:57
13.	"Spatial Architects"	5:46
14.	"Beneath These Waves" (edit)	3:40

== Personnel ==
- Hansi Kürsch – vocals
- Jon Schaffer – lead, rhythm, and acoustic guitars, bass

Guest musicians

- Bobby Jarzombek – drums and percussion
- Jim Morris – guitar solos and backing vocals
- Rubin Drake – bass and fretless bass guitar
- Howard Helm – piano and backing vocals
- Kathy Helm – backing vocals
- Tori Fuson – backing vocals
- Jesse Morris – backing vocals
- Krystyna Kolaczynski – cello

== Lyrical content ==
- "Crimson King" is a reference to the Crimson King, the main antagonist of The Dark Tower series. The song also strongly references Randall Flagg, one of the King's many servants. Hansi in an interview has also stated that the Crimson King is Satan.
- "The Gunslinger" is referring to Roland of Gilead, the protagonist of the Dark Tower series. The song refers mainly to the plot of the final book of the series.
- "Terror Train" is a reference to Blaine the Mono, from the third and fourth novels of the Dark Tower series.
- "Beneath These Waves" is based on Herman Melville's Moby Dick.
- "Seize the Day" is based on Tolkien's The Lord of the Rings.
- "Love's Tragedy Asunder" is about a man whose wife is terminally ill, and he assists her suicide, and ends up killing himself.
- "Wicked Witch" is about the Wicked Witch of the West from L. Frank Baum's The Wizard of Oz. It also refers Rhea from Dark Tower series who shows several similarities to Wicked Witch of the West.
- "Dorian" is about Oscar Wilde's novel The Picture of Dorian Gray.
- "Down Where I Am" is about a baby born with Down syndrome and the struggle of his father and the emotions going in and out of his mind.
