= Crucible (album) =

Studio album by Halford
- Released: June 25, 2002
- Genre: Heavy metal, groove metal
- Length: 56:33
- Label: Metal-is Records, Metal God Records
- Producer: Roy Z

Halford chronology
Live Insurrection (2001)	Crucible (2002)	Metal God Essentials, Vol. 1 (2006)

Alternative cover
- 2010 remixed and remastered edition cover

Professional ratings
Review scores
Source	Rating
AllMusic	4/5 stars

Crucible is the second studio album by the heavy metal band Halford released in 2002. A remixed and remastered edition was released in 2010. In contrast with the retrospective approach of the previous Halford album, Resurrection, Crucible was an intentional effort to depart from the traditional metal themes. The album has been described as "harder, darker, and more moody than Resurrection".

== Track listing ==
No.	Title	Writer(s)	Length
1.	"Park Manor" (instrumental)	Rob Halford, Roy Z, John Baxter	1:11
2.	"Crucible"	Halford, Roy Z	4:26
3.	"One Will"	Halford, Patrick Lachman, Roy Z, Mike Chlasciak, Bobby Jarzombek, Baxter	3:32
4.	"Betrayal"	Halford, Lachman, Riendeau	3:04
5.	"Handing Out Bullets"	Halford, Lachman, Jarzombek	3:16
6.	"Hearts of Darkness"	Halford, Roy Z, Baxter	3:48
7.	"Crystal"	Halford, Roy Z, Baxter	4:37
8.	"Heretic"	Halford, Chlasciak	3:49
9.	"Golgotha"	Halford, Lachman, Chlasciak, Baxter	4:20
10.	"Wrath of God"	Halford, Lachman, Chlasciak, Jarzombek	3:11
11.	"Weaving Sorrow"	Halford, Lachman, Baxter	3:28
12.	"Sun"	Halford, Roy Z, Baxter	3:48
13.	"Trail of Tears"	Halford, Lachman, Roy Z, Chlasciak, Riendeau, Jarzombek, Baxter	5:56

Limited edition bonus tracks
No.	Title	Writer(s)	Length
14.	"She"	Halford, Lachman, Chlasciak	4:01
15.	"Fugitive"	Halford, Lachman, Roy Z	4:01

Japanese edition bonus tracks
No.	Title	Writer(s)	Length
14.	"Rock the World Forever"	Halford, Lachman, Baxter	3:07
15.	"In the Morning"	Halford	2:25

== 2010 remixed and remastered edition ==
No.	Title	Writer(s)	Length
1.	"Betrayal"	Halford, Lachman, Riendeau	3:04
2.	"One Will"	Halford, Roy Z, Baxter, Lachman, Chlasciak, Jarzombek	3:32
3.	"Hearts of Darkness"	Halford, Roy Z, Baxter	3:51
4.	"Golgotha"	Halford, Chlasciak, Baxter	4:23
5.	"Handing Out Bullets"	Halford, Chlasciak, Lachman, Jarzombek	3:15
6.	"Crystal"	Halford, Roy Z, Baxter	4:47
7.	"Fugitive"	Halford, Lachman, Roy Z, Baxter	4:01
8.	"Wrath of God"	Halford, Lachman, Chlasciak, Jarzombek	3:12
9.	"In the Morning"	Halford	2:21
10.	"Rock the World Forever"	Halford, Lachman, Baxter	3:11
11.	"Crucible"	Halford, Roy Z	4:38
12.	"Heretic"	Halford, Chlasciak	3:53
13.	"She"	Halford, Lachman	4:04
14.	"Weaving Sorrow"	Halford, Lachman	3:27
15.	"Sun"	Halford, Roy Z, Baxter	3:48
16.	"Trail of Tears"	Halford, Riendeau, Roy Z, Baxter, Chlasciak, Jarzombek, Lachman	4:27

== Personnel ==
Halford

- Rob Halford – vocals
- Metal Mike Chlasciak – guitar
- Patrick Lachman – guitar
- Ray Riendeau – bass
- Bobby Jarzombek – drums

Additional performer

- Roy Z – guitar

Production

- Produced by Roy Z, except "In the Morning", produced by Ritchie Podolor and Roy Z
- Executive producer/A&R – John Baxter
- Mixed by Bill Cooper, Roy Z, and Joe Floyd
- Mastered by George Marino

2010 Edition

- Mixed by Tue Madsen
- Mastered by Tom Baker
- Art design by Mark Sasso and t42design
- Booklet layout/additional art by Attila Juhasz
- Photography by John Eder

== Charts ==
Chart (2002)	Peak position
Finnish Albums (Suomen virallinen lista)	31
French Albums (SNEP)	100
German Albums (Offizielle Top 100)	33
Japanese Albums (Oricon)	24
UK Independent Albums (OCC)	41
UK Rock & Metal Albums (OCC)	33
US Billboard 200	140
US Heatseekers Albums (Billboard)	2
