= Demons & Wizards (Demons & Wizards album) =

Studio album by Demons & Wizards
- Released: February 8, 2000
- Recorded: Mid–late 1999
- Studio: Morrisound Studios
- Genre: Power metal
- Length: 57:43
- Label: Steamhammer/SPV

Demons & Wizards chronology
Demons & Wizards (2000)	Touched by the Crimson King (2005)

Professional ratings
Review scores
Source	Rating
AllMusic	3/5 stars
Metal Rules	5/5 stars

Demons & Wizards is the debut album by Demons & Wizards, a side-project by Hansi Kürsch of Blind Guardian and Jon Schaffer of Iced Earth. Released in February 2000, the album was recorded with the help of Jim Morris, who plays lead guitar on almost all tracks, and by Mark Prator on drums.

== Track listing ==
=== Standard issue ===
Distributed in Europe and North America by SPV and in Japan by Victor Entertainment.

No.	Title	Lyrics	Music	Length
1.	"Rites of Passage"	(instrumental)	Jon Schaffer, Hansi Kürsch	0:54
2.	"Heaven Denies"	Schaffer, Kürsch	Schaffer, Kürsch	5:20
3.	"Poor Man's Crusade"	Schaffer, Kürsch	Schaffer, Kürsch	4:02
4.	"Fiddler on the Green"	Schaffer, Kürsch	Schaffer, Kürsch	5:56
5.	"Blood on My Hands"	Schaffer, Kürsch	Schaffer, Kürsch	4:45
6.	"Path of Glory"	Schaffer, Kürsch	Schaffer, Kürsch	4:59
7.	"Winter of Souls"	Schaffer, Kürsch	Schaffer, Kürsch	5:47
8.	"The Whistler"	Schaffer, Kürsch	Schaffer, Kürsch	5:15
9.	"Tear Down the Wall"	Schaffer, Kürsch	Schaffer, Kürsch	4:48
10.	"Gallow's Pole"	Schaffer, Kürsch	Schaffer, Kürsch	5:22
11.	"My Last Sunrise"	Schaffer, Kürsch	Schaffer, Kürsch	4:44
12.	"Chant"	(instrumental)	Schaffer, Kürsch	0:48

Japanese bonus tracks
No.	Title	Lyrics	Music	Length
13.	"White Room" (Cream cover) (also in limited edition and vinyl releases)	Pete Brown	Pete Brown, Jack Bruce	5:01
14.	"The Whistler" (alternate version)	Schaffer, Kürsch	Schaffer, Kürsch	5:21

=== Argentinian release ===
Distributed in Argentina by NEMS Enterprises.

No.	Title	Lyrics	Music	Length
1.	"Rites of Passage"	(instrumental)	Jon Schaffer, Hansi Kürsch	0:54
2.	"Heaven Denies"	Schaffer, Kürsch	Schaffer, Kürsch	5:20
3.	"Poor Man's Crusade"	Schaffer, Kürsch	Schaffer, Kürsch	4:02
4.	"Fiddler on the Green"	Schaffer, Kürsch	Schaffer, Kürsch	5:56
5.	"Blood on My Hands"	Schaffer, Kürsch	Schaffer, Kürsch	4:45
6.	"Path of Glory"	Schaffer, Kürsch	Schaffer, Kürsch	4:59
7.	"Winter of Souls"	Schaffer, Kürsch	Schaffer, Kürsch	5:47
8.	"The Whistler"	Schaffer, Kürsch	Schaffer, Kürsch	5:15
9.	"Tear Down the Wall"	Schaffer, Kürsch	Schaffer, Kürsch	4:48
10.	"Gallow's Pole"	Schaffer, Kürsch	Schaffer, Kürsch	5:22
11.	"My Last Sunrise"	Schaffer, Kürsch	Schaffer, Kürsch	4:44
12.	"Chant"	(instrumental)	Schaffer, Kürsch	0:48
13.	"White Room" (Cream cover)	Pete Brown	Pete Brown, Jack Bruce	5:01
14.	"Heaven Denies" (demo version)	Schaffer, Kürsch	Schaffer, Kürsch	5:09
15.	"The Whistler" (demo version)	Schaffer, Kürsch	Schaffer, Kürsch	5:21
16.	"Tear Down the Wall" (demo version)	Schaffer, Kürsch	Schaffer, Kürsch	4:46

== Lyrical content ==
- "Heaven Denies" is based on Milton's Paradise Lost, about the downfall of Lucifer.
- "Poor Man's Crusade" is about the Crusades in a mocking tone, in particular the popular crusades and the Crusade of the Poor.
- "Fiddler on the Green" is about two car accidents which Kürsch witnessed.
- "Winter of Souls" is about King Arthur and Mordred.
- "Blood on My Hands" is based on Wagner's version of Siegfried's story, as told in the Ring cycle.
- "The Whistler" is based on the legend of the Pied Piper of Hamelin.

== Personnel ==
Demons & Wizards

- Hansi Kürsch – vocals
- Jon Schaffer – lead and rhythm guitar, bass

Guest musicians

- Jim Morris – additional lead guitars
- Mark Prator – drums
