= Juggernaut (band) =

American thrash metal band

Background information
- Origin: San Antonio, Texas, U.S.
- Genres: Thrash metal, progressive metal
- Years active: 1985–1993
- Label: Metal Blade
- Past members: Steve Cooper; Eddie Katilius; Scott Womack; Bobby "Wire" Jarzombek; Harlan Glenn; Bob Catlin; Dave McClain

Juggernaut was an American progressive thrash metal band formed in San Antonio, Texas in 1985.

== History ==
Former Kamakazi members Scott Womack (bass) and Harlan Glenn (vocals) formed Juggernaut in 1985. They were joined by guitarist Robert Catlin, formerly of S.A. Slayer. Catlin's former S.A. Slayer bandmate Dave McClain, later of Sacred Reich and Machine Head, joined the band long enough to record the track "In The Blood of Virgins" for Metal Blade Records' Metal Massacre VII compilation in 1986. That year, the band played many shows, including sold-out shows with King Diamond.

After Dave Richards of Azra/Iron Works Records approached them to release an EP, the band signed with Metal Blade Records and released two studio albums, Baptism Under Fire (1986) and Trouble Within (1987). Both featured guitarist Eddie Katilius, who joined the group two weeks before recording Baptism Under Fire. Katilius wore a World War II-era gas mask on the cover of Baptism Under Fire.

Frontman Harlan Glenn left the group due to 'musical differences', and moved to Los Angeles, where he fronted a couple of bands, including Bon Appetit. His replacement was former Liquid Sky, S.A. Slayer, and Narita vocalist Steve Cooper, with whom the band recorded the Trouble Within album. Drummer Bobby Jarzombek left to join Riot, but agreed to record Trouble Within on a session basis. Juggernaut disbanded in 1993 after various incarnations in Dallas, Texas, which included Denny Shoup (guitar), Phil Thomas (drums), and John Davis (vocals), with bassist Scott Womack the only remaining musician from San Antonio.

In 1998, Baptism Under Fire was re-issued on CD, including the band's unreleased Iron Works Records EP as bonus tracks, by German-based High Vaultage Records. Singer Steve Cooper died of kidney failure due to complications of type 1 diabetes on May 14, 2006.

Harlan Glenn became a director, producer, author, archival supervisor, and technical advisor for The History Channel and The Discovery Channel, specializing in World War II history. He has published several WWII history books.

== Members ==
=== Original recording lineup (1985) ===
- Harlan Glenn – vocals
- Bob Catlin – guitars
- Scott Womack – bass
- Dave McClain – drums

=== Baptism Under Fire lineup (1986) ===
- Harlan Glenn – vocals
- Eddie Katilius – guitars
- Scott Womack – bass
- Bobby Jarzombek – drums

=== Trouble Within lineup (1987) ===
- Steve Cooper – vocals
- Eddie Katilius – guitars
- Scott Womack – bass
- Bobby Jarzombek – drums

== Discography ==
=== Studio albums ===
- Baptism Under Fire (1986)
- Trouble Within (1987)

=== Other appearances ===
- Metal Massacre VII (1986)
