= Celestial (Rob Halford album) =

Studio album by Rob Halford
- Released: October 18, 2019
- Studios: Bay Ten Studios, Walsall, West Midlands; Gospel Oak Studios, Rowington Green, Oxfordshire; The Cabin Studio, Streetly West Midlands; Woodworm Studios, Barford St Michael, Oxfordshire
- Genres: Heavy metal, Christmas music
- Length: 45:13
- Label: Legacy
- Producer: Mike Exeter

Rob Halford chronology
Halford IV: Made of Metal (2010)	Celestial (2019)

Professional ratings
Review scores
Source	Rating
AllMusic	3/5 stars
The Arts Desk	5/5 stars
Blabbermouth.net	8/10
KNAC	4/5

Celestial is a solo studio album by British heavy metal singer Rob Halford recorded with his family and friends. His previous solo album Winter Songs was released in 2009. The album is a collection of traditional Christmas carols interpreted by Halford and several originals written by bandmembers.

== Reception ==
Guy Oddy of The Arts Desk stated, "...on Celestial, Rob Halford has proved himself to be the one man who can out-camp The Darkness, even with a complete lack of fruity humour and innuendo, but by somehow throwing all self-consciousness aside. For this is an album that doesn’t so much straddle the line between genius and insanity but gamely embraces both, and could just be the greatest rock’n’roll Christmas album ever because of it." Jay H. Gorania of Blabbermouth.net wrote, "There is an undeniable sense of self-awareness throughout "Celestial" as he performs family-friendly classics with heavy metal's fist-to-the-face approach, which highlights his banshee-like wailing, crooning, screeching and growling. The irony is not lost on our favorite hell-raiser at all."

== Track listing ==
No.	Title	Writer(s)	Length
1.	"Celestial"	Mike Exeter, Rob Halford	1:32
2.	"Donner and Blitzen"	Mike Exeter, Rob Halford, Alex Hill, Robert Jones	3:31
3.	"God Rest Ye Merry Gentlemen"	Traditional	2:45
4.	"Away in a Manger"	Traditional	4:03
5.	"Morning Star"	Rob Halford, Robert Jones	4:14
6.	"Deck the Halls"	Traditional	5:03
7.	"Joy to the World"	Traditional	2:48
8.	"O Little Town of Bethlehem"	Traditional	5:31
9.	"Hark! The Herald Angels Sing"	Traditional	2:06
10.	"The First Noel"	Traditional	4:24
11.	"Good King Wenceslas"	Traditional	7:28
12.	"Protected by the Light"	Mike Exeter, Rob Halford	1:48
Total length:			45:13

== Personnel ==
- Rob Halford – vocals, percussion
- Alex Hill - bass guitar, vocals
- Robert Jones - lead guitar, rhythm guitar, keyboards, vocals, programming
- Nigel Halford – drums, percussion
- Mike Exeter – keyboards
- Jon Blakey – lead guitar, rhythm guitar
- Phil Ridden – percussion
- Sue Halford - percussion

== Charts ==
Chart (2019)	Peak position
German Albums (Offizielle Top 100)	92
Spanish Albums (Promusicae)	74
UK Rock & Metal Albums (Official Charts)	15
US Top Album Sales (Billboard)	26
US Heatseekers Albums (Billboard)	2
US Top Holiday Albums (Billboard)	4
