= Demons & Wizards (band) =

German-American power metal band

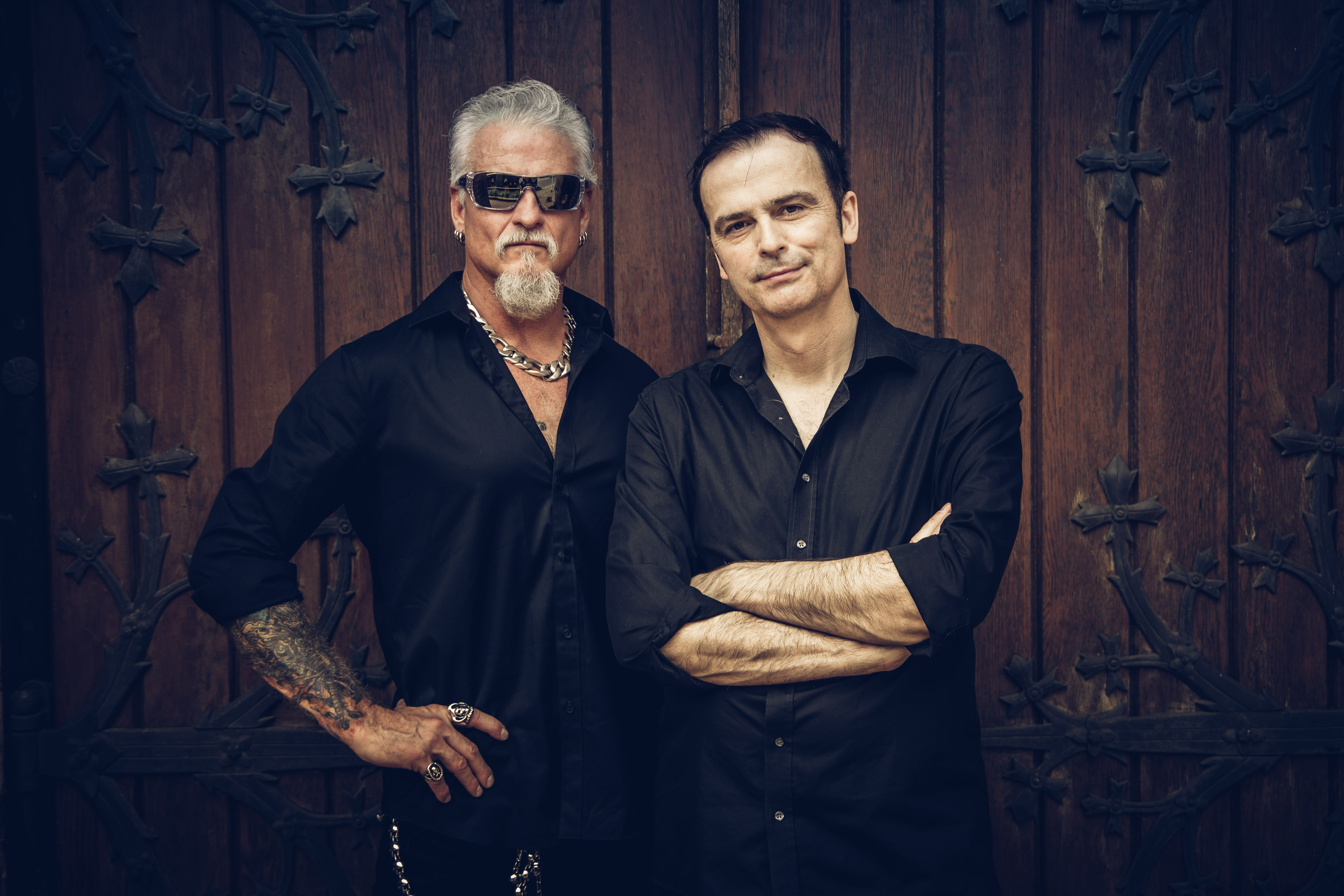
- Jon Schaffer and Hansi Kürsch in 2019

Background information
- Origin: Germany; United States
- Genres: Power metal; progressive metal
- Years active: 1998–2021
- Labels: SPV; Century Media
- Past members: Jon Schaffer; Hansi Kürsch

Demons & Wizards was a power metal band conceived as a side-project by Blind Guardian vocalist Hansi Kürsch and Jon Schaffer, the guitarist for Iced Earth. Schaffer wrote the music and Kürsch wrote the lyrics. The band's line-up during the recording of their first album in 1999 (Demons & Wizards) featured Mark Prator, who was the drummer on a few Iced Earth albums, and Jim Morris, who has engineered for Iced Earth before, on lead guitar. The personnel for the second album (Touched by the Crimson King), released in 2005, included Morris on lead guitar and Bobby Jarzombek on drums. The band released a third studio album, III, in 2020, and disbanded in early 2021.

== Band history ==
=== Band name ===
The original goal of the band was to forge the different musical styles of both Iced Earth's dark melodies and Blind Guardian's powerful vocals into one sound. In fact, according to the musicians, the band name is meant to describe the two styles: the self-proclaimed demon-like themes and sounds of Iced Earth and wizard-like themes and sounds of Blind Guardian (the moniker "Demons & Wizards" was inspired by Schaffer's wife always referring to him and Hansi as "Demons and Angels". Hansi always corrected her, since he claims to "not be at all angelic", and that it is more properly stated "Demons and Wizards", in reference to Uriah Heep's album of the same name). The band met with a fair deal of commercial success, though not as much as either of their individual bands.

The idea for the band arose in the spring of 1997 when Kürsch and Schaffer wanted to make music together, after being friends for several years.

=== Album information ===
The band's first full-length release was in 2000, with the self-titled album Demons & Wizards. In 2005, the band released their second album entitled Touched by the Crimson King. Touched by the Crimson King is partially based on The Dark Tower series of books (written by Stephen King), in which the Crimson King is one antagonist.

=== Recent activity, touring, and third studio album ===
In a March 2009 interview, when asked about what projects he would be working on after taking a vacation, guitarist Jon Schaffer stated:

"You're going to have to wait and find out my man. I mean, I'm just not ready to divulge yet. I've got a few irons in the fire and some things I'm very excited about. Hansi and I have planned late in 2009 to get together to do DEMONS (and WIZARDS) stuff so that's going to be cool. We saw each other in Cologne (earlier this year) and made plans and I think it's realistic to say that there will be a third DEMONS and WIZARDS album probably mid- to late 2010. We're going to have two song writing sessions. We are committed to doing the bulk of this in-person. One of the things I felt like from the last Demons album was that we had this window of opportunity where we had to get it done and we kind of let time dictate the schedule instead of our feelings and that was probably a mistake. I mean I'm proud of that record (Touched by the Crimson King, 2005) and it sold killer and it's a good album but I think Hansi and I are capable of a lot more especially when we get back to the root reasons of why we did this thing together. We are not going to be bogged down by schedules – we're going to do this as we see fit and we're not going to let a particular window of opportunity dictate that this is when we have to do it. We're going to do it as it feels natural – and if we feel that in Spring of 2010 that we don't have the songs yet then we'll push it back. I mean, we don't have to do it on any specific schedule. We had a really long talk about it and I'm really looking forward to it because I always enjoy working with Hansi and just spending time with him. So, our first get-together is going to be late in the year, but before that I've got a few things going on and like I said, we'll announce it in due course."

On March 15, 2011, singer Hansi Kürsch posted an update on the official Blind Guardian website, containing the following news:

"As we had time to share some serious moments with each other during the 70000 Tons of Metal cruise (somewhere on the oceans of time) Jon [Schaffer; Iced Earth & Sons of Liberty] and I had finally found the chance to put our minds together for a possible next Demons & Wizards album. We cheerfully simultaneously announced our wish to start working on it as quickly as possible. Although time is an issue for both of us we nonetheless decided to start song writing together during the European summer festival season when Jon will be in Europe for Iced Earth performances. During that season we will use every possible moment to complete as much material as possible."

On February 13, 2015, in an interview when asked about Demons & Wizards and his relationship with Jon Schaffer, Kürsch replied:

"Jon and I still have a very close relationship and we constantly talk to each other. And of course we talk about Demons & Wizards, but unfortunately I do not see us being able to make another album before the year 2017. I desperately would love to do it, immediately, if possible, but our schedules are so occupied that we never have time to focus on new songwriting. But there will come a time where we will do the album. And once we do it we will want to do touring as well. This prospective album would be the third Demons & Wizards album, and a very important one."

On May 15, 2017, Schaffer confirmed in an interview with Metal Wani that he was working with Kürsch on material for a new Demons & Wizards album.

Demons & Wizards have confirmed that they will be playing at the Hellfest festival in June 2019, at the Wacken Open Air festival in August 2019, will headline ProgPower USA in September 2019 and they began their first North American tour in August 2019.

In December 2019, the band announced their third studio album, III. It was released on February 21, 2020. The album was cited as one of Paul Stenning's albums of the year for Brave Words.

=== Disbandment ===
On January 6, 2021, guitarist Jon Schaffer was photographed among the protesters who stormed the U.S. Capitol building in Washington, D.C. After appearing on the Most Wanted section of the FBI's website, Schaffer turned himself in on January 17 and was held on six felony charges. Century Media dropped the band from their roster two days later. On February 1, 2021, vocalist Hansi Kürsch ended his collaboration with Schaffer.

== Members ==
=== Last known lineup ===
- Jon Schaffer – rhythm guitar, bass (studio)
- Hansi Kürsch – vocals

Live members

- Jake Dreyer – lead guitar
- Marcus Siepen – bass
- Frederik Ehmke – drums
- Joost Van Den Broek – keyboards

=== Former live/session members ===
- Mark Prator – drums
- Richard Christy – drums
- Howard Helm – backing vocals, piano
- Kathy Helm – backing vocals
- Tori Fuson – backing vocals
- Jesse Morrison – backing vocals
- Krystyna Kolaczynski – cello
- Ritchie Wilkison – lead guitar
- Bobby Jarzombek – drums
- Rubin Drake – bass
- Jim Morris – lead guitar
- Brent Smedley – drums

== Discography ==
- Demons & Wizards (2000)
- Touched by the Crimson King (2005)
- III (2020)

== See also ==
- Blind Guardian
- Iced Earth
