= Live Insurrection =

Live album by Halford
- Released: April 17, 2001
- Recorded: 2000–2001
- Genre: Heavy metal
- Length: 1:57:28
- Label: Metal-is Records
- Producer: Roy Z

Halford chronology
Resurrection (2000)	Live Insurrection (2001)	Crucible (2002)

Alternative cover
- 2009 remastered edition cover

Professional ratings
Review scores
Source	Rating
AllMusic	3/5 stars

Live Insurrection is a live album by the band Halford, released in Japan on March 28, 2001, and released worldwide in April 2001 with one less track (see 2001 in music). The flag that Rob Halford is kissing on the cover of the album is the Flag of Chile.

== Track listing ==
Disc 1
No.	Title	Writer(s)	Length
1.	"Resurrection"	Rob Halford, Patrick Lachman, Roy Z, John Baxter	4:02
2.	"Made in Hell"	Halford, Z, Baxter	4:13
3.	"Into the Pit"	Halford	4:15
4.	"Nailed to the Gun"	Halford	3:35
5.	"Light Comes Out of Black"	Halford	5:00
6.	"Stained Class"	Halford, Glenn Tipton	5:32
7.	"Jawbreaker"	Halford, K. K. Downing, Tipton	3:25
8.	"Running Wild"	Tipton	3:02
9.	"Slow Down"	Halford, Z, Bob Marlette	4:40
10.	"The One You Love to Hate" (featuring Bruce Dickinson)	Halford, Z, Dickinson	3:11
11.	"Life in Black"	Halford	4:26
12.	"Hell's Last Survivor"	Halford, Mike Chlasciak	3:24
13.	"Sad Wings"	Halford, Patrick Lachman, Chlasciak	3:33
14.	"Saviour"	Halford, Lachman, Z	2:57
15.	"Silent Screams"	Halford, Marlette	7:32

Disc 2
No.	Title	Writer(s)	Length
1.	"Intro" (removed for 2009 remaster)		0:14
2.	"Cyberworld"	Halford, Z, Chlasciak	3:04
3.	"The Hellion"	Halford, Downing, Tipton	0:48
4.	"Electric Eye"	Halford, Downing, Tipton	3:29
5.	"Riding on the Wind"	Halford, Downing, Tipton	3:10
6.	"Genocide" (1st encore)	Halford, Downing, Tipton	7:36
7.	"Beyond the Realms of Death"	Halford, Les Binks	6:51
8.	"Metal Gods" (2nd encore)	Halford, Downing, Tipton	4:34
9.	"Breaking the Law"	Halford, Downing, Tipton	3:50
10.	"Blackout" (featuring Rudolf Schenker, originally a Japanese bonus track, restored on 2009 remaster)	Herman Rarebell, Klaus Meine, Rudolf Schenker	4:19
11.	"Tyrant"	Halford, Tipton	4:41
12.	"Screaming in the Dark" (studio recording)	Halford, Lachman, Z, Baxter	3:41
13.	"Heart of a Lion" (studio recording)	Halford, Downing, Tipton	3:51
14.	"Prisoner of Your Eyes" (studio recording)	Halford, Downing, Tipton, Lachman	4:33

== Notes ==
- The Japanese release and the 2009 remastered version contains a cover of the Scorpions song "Blackout", featuring guitarist Rudolf Schenker
- "Screaming in the Dark" is a brand new recording
- "Heart of a Lion" and "Prisoner of Your Eyes" are Judas Priest songs that never made it onto any Judas Priest studio album. The original recording of "Prisoner of Your Eyes" (with a different chorus) can be found on the remaster of Screaming for Vengeance. The song "Heart of a Lion" originally appeared on the Racer X album Second Heat and is featured on the Metalogy box set.
- "Into the Pit", "Nailed to the Gun" and "Life in Black" are originally Fight songs found on War of Words.
- "Light Comes Out of Black" and "Life in Black" are studio songs with added crowd noise. "Light Comes Out of Black" was originally released on the Buffy the Vampire Slayer movie soundtrack, performed by Rob Halford and Pantera.
- "The One You Love to Hate" is a combination of Rob Halford and Bruce Dickinson's soundcheck and live performances from the London LA2 show.

== Personnel ==
Halford

- Rob Halford – vocals
- Patrick Lachman – guitar
- Mike Chlasciak – guitar
- Ray Riendeau – bass
- Bobby Jarzombek – drums

Additional performers

- Bruce Dickinson – Co-lead vocals on "The One You Love To Hate"
- Rudolf Schenker – Co-rhythm guitar on "Blackout"

Production

- Produced by Roy Z
- Executive producer/A&R – John Baxter
- Engineered by Eric Kuglin
- Mixed by Charlie Bauerfeind and Roy Z
- Digital editing – Richard "Guru" Carrette
- Additional engineering – Joe "Flo" Floyd
- Pre-production digital transfers – Sean White and Jason Southard
- Mastered by George Marino (2001)
- Remastered by Tom Baker (2006)
- Art and design by Marc Sasso (2009 CD release)
- Booklet layout/additional art – Attila Juhasz
- Photography by Gregg Kozak, Fin Costello, and Ross Halfin

== Charts ==
Chart (2001)	Peak position
German Albums (Offizielle Top 100)	52
Japanese Albums (Oricon)	38
Swedish Albums (Sverigetopplistan)	57
UK Independent Albums (OCC)	27
UK Rock & Metal Albums (OCC)	21
US Heatseekers Albums (Billboard)	28
