= Halford IV: Made of Metal =

Studio album by Halford
- Released: September 28, 2010 (US); September 27, 2010 (EU)
- Recorded: 2010
- Genre: Heavy metal
- Label: Metal God Entertainment
- Producer: Roy Z

Halford chronology
Halford III: Winter Songs (2009)	Halford IV: Made of Metal (2010)	Celestial (2019)

Professional ratings
Review scores
Source	Rating
AllMusic	3.5/5 stars
About.com	4/5 stars
BW&BK	7/10
Lords of Metal	82/100

Halford IV: Made of Metal is the fourth studio album by the heavy metal band Halford, the solo project of Judas Priest frontman Rob Halford. It was produced by Roy Z and recorded during 2009 and 2010. The album was released on September 28, 2010. Singles from the album include "The Mower" and "Made of Metal", for which an animated video was made.

== Track listing ==
All songs arranged by Rob Halford, Roy Z.

No.	Title	Writer(s)	Length
1.	"Undisputed"	Rob Halford	5:17
2.	"Fire and Ice"	Rob Halford	2:52
3.	"Made of Metal"	Rob Halford, Roy Z, John Baxter	3:55
4.	"Speed of Sound"	Rob Halford, Roy Z, Mike Chlasciak, John Baxter	4:32
5.	"Like There's No Tomorrow"	Rob Halford	4:20
6.	"Till the Day I Die"	Rob Halford, Roy Z	3:50
7.	"We Own the Night"	Rob Halford, Roy Z, John Baxter	3:54
8.	"Heartless"	Rob Halford	3:38
9.	"Hell Razor"	Rob Halford	3:44
10.	"Thunder and Lightning"	Rob Halford, Roy Z	5:28
11.	"Twenty-Five Years"	Rob Halford	7:01
12.	"Matador"	Rob Halford	5:39
13.	"I Know We Stand a Chance"	Rob Halford, Roy Z, John Baxter	3:51
14.	"The Mower"	Rob Halford, Roy Z	4:37

== Personnel ==
Halford

- Rob Halford – vocals
- Roy Z – guitar
- Metal Mike Chlasciak – guitar
- Mike Davis – bass
- Bobby Jarzombek – drums

Additional performer

- Ed Roth – keyboards

Production

- Produced and engineered by Roy Z
- Executive producer – John Baxter
- Mixed by Pete Martinez
- Sound design by John Mattox
- Mastered by Maor Appelbaum
- Graphic direction, marketing, and web design by Attila Juhasz
- Booklet art by Dean Wright
- Photography by Eddie Malluk and John Baxter

== Charts ==
Chart (2010)	Peak position
German Albums (Offizielle Top 100)	80
Japanese Albums (Oricon)	81
Swedish Albums (Sverigetopplistan)	46
US Billboard 200	160
US Top Hard Rock Albums (Billboard)	14
US Heatseekers Albums (Billboard)	5
US Independent Albums (Billboard)	26
