= Resurrection (Halford album) =

Studio album by Halford
- Released: August 8, 2000
- Recorded: August 15, 1998 – June 27, 2000
- Genre: Heavy metal
- Length: 48:32
- Label: Metal-is, Metal God
- Producer: Roy Z

Halford chronology
Resurrection (2000)	Live Insurrection (2001)

Alternative cover
- 2006 remastered edition cover

Rob Halford chronology
Voyeurs (1998)	Resurrection (2000)	Live Insurrection (2001)

Resurrection is the debut album by the American heavy metal band Halford, released on August 8, 2000. It features the song "The One You Love to Hate", featuring Iron Maiden vocalist Bruce Dickinson. "Silent Screams" is a re-recorded song that was originally written by Halford's previous band 2wo.

In 2006, the album was remastered and re-released on iTunes containing the two bonus tracks from the original Japanese edition. It was packaged on the digipak DVD release of Resurrection World Tour – Live at Rock in Rio III in 2008 containing two more tracks and as a stand alone CD re-release in 2009 with the same content.

== Critical reception ==
Professional ratings
Review scores
Source	Rating
AllMusic	4.5/5 stars
Rock Hard	9/10

In September 2003, Resurrection was ranked number 54 on a list of "The Top 100 Heavy Metal Albums" by online magazine Metal-Rules.com. In 2005, Resurrection was ranked number 320 in Rock Hard magazine's book The 500 Greatest Rock & Metal Albums of All Time.

== Track listing ==
No.	Title	Writer(s)	Length
1.	"Resurrection"	Rob Halford, Patrick Lachman, Roy Z, John Baxter	3:58
2.	"Made in Hell"	Halford, Z, Baxter	4:12
3.	"Locked and Loaded"	Halford, Lachman, Z	3:18
4.	"Night Fall"	Halford, Lachman, Mike Chlasciak	3:41
5.	"Silent Screams"	Halford, Bob Marlette	7:06
6.	"The One You Love to Hate" (feat. Bruce Dickinson)	Halford, Z, Bruce Dickinson	3:11
7.	"Cyberworld"	Halford, Z, Chlasciak	3:08
8.	"Slow Down"	Halford, Z, Marlette	4:51
9.	"Twist"	Bob Halligan Jr.	4:08
10.	"Temptation"	Halford, Lachman, Z, Chlasciak	3:32
11.	"Drive"	Halford, Z, Marlette, John 5	4:30
12.	"Saviour"	Halford, Lachman, Z	2:57

Japanese edition bonus tracks
No.	Title	Writer(s)	Length
13.	"Sad Wings"	Halford, Lachman, Chlasciak	3:38
14.	"Hell's Last Survivor"	Halford, Chlasciak	3:24

2009 bonus tracks
No.	Title	Writer(s)	Length
15.	"God Bringer of Death"	Halford, Lachman, Chlasciak	2:45
16.	"Fetish"	Halford, Lachman, Chlasciak, Baxter	3:12

== Personnel ==
Halford

- Rob Halford – vocals
- Patrick Lachman – guitar
- Mike Chlasciak – guitar
- Ray Riendeau – bass
- Bobby Jarzombek – drums

Additional performers

- Roy Z – guitar
- Bruce Dickinson – additional lead vocals on "The One You Love to Hate"
- Pete Parada – drums on "The One You Love to Hate"
- Ed Roth – keyboards on "Silent Screams" and "Twist"

Production

- Produced by Roy Z
- Executive producer/A&R – John Baxter
- Drums recorded by Billy Bowers, assisted by Mike Terry
- Guitars, bass, and other instrumentation recorded by Joe Floyd and Roy Z, with digital editing by Richard "The Guru" Carrette
- Vocals and additional instrumentation recorded by Bill Cooper and Attie Bauw
- Mixed by Attie Bauw and Charlie Baurfeind
- Mastered by Tom Baker (2006 edition)
- Photography by John Eder and Fin Costello
- Art and design by Marc Sasso (2009 CD release)

== Charts ==
Chart (2000)	Peak position
Austrian Albums (Ö3 Austria)	42
German Albums (Offizielle Top 100)	12
Japanese Albums (Oricon)	9
Swedish Albums (Sverigetopplistan)	21
Swiss Albums (Schweizer Hitparade)	90
UK Independent Albums (OCC)	24
UK Rock & Metal Albums (OCC)	6
US Billboard 200	140
US Heatseekers Albums (Billboard)	5
