= Two (metal band) =

English/American industrial metal band

- Origin: Los Angeles, California, U.S.
- Genres: Industrial metal
- Years active: 1996–1998
- Labels: Nothing
- Spinoffs: Halford
- Members: Rob Halford; Bob Marlette; John 5 Ray Riendeau; Sid Riggs; James Woolley

Two was an English-American industrial metal band, formed by former Judas Priest lead singer Rob Halford after the break-up of his previous band Fight.

== History ==
Halford and guitarist John 5 formed the band in 1996 under the name Gimp and would record an album's worth of demos. While attending Mardi Gras in New Orleans, Halford met Trent Reznor and presented him a copy of the material, which in return, Reznor stepped in as producer and released it under his Nothing Records label. Upon discovering that another band was using the Gimp name, the group was redubbed 2wo. In March 1998, the album Voyeurs was released. It sold poorly and was not well received. After a headlining tour, 2wo disbanded and John 5 would join Marilyn Manson. Halford initially began demos for a follow-up album, but eventually called the band quits and would use the material for his next band Halford.

== Discography ==
=== Studio albums ===
Logo

Title	Album details	Peak chart positions	Sales
Title	Album details	US	Sales
Voyeurs	Released: 1998; Label: Nothing Records; Formats: CD, CS	176	US: 47,000+

=== Singles ===
Year	Title	US Main. Rock	Album
1998	"I Am a Pig"	22	Voyeurs
1998	"Deep in the Ground"	—	Voyeurs

== Videography ==
Halford hired porn director Chi Chi Larue to direct the video for the first single, "I Am a Pig". This video featured grainy S&M scenes of the band and various porn stars, including a few brief glimpses of Janine Lindemulder, in a sex dungeon. It also incorporates some of the album's artwork into the concept. It was not widely shown because of its content, but was not banned.
