= Halford III: Winter Songs =

Studio album by Halford
- Released: November 3, 2009 (US); November 9, 2009 (EU)
- Recorded: 2008–2009
- Genre: Heavy metal, christmas music
- Length: 41:57
- Label: Metal God Entertainment
- Producer: Roy Z

Halford chronology
Metal God Essentials, Vol. 1 (2006)	Halford III: Winter Songs (2009)	Halford IV: Made of Metal (2010)

Professional ratings
Review scores
Source	Rating
AllMusic	3.5/5 stars
Lords of Metal	77/100
Metal Express Radio	9/10

Halford III: Winter Songs is the third studio album by the heavy metal band Halford.

== Background ==
The album was released on November 3, 2009, in the United States, November 9, 2009, in Europe and November 13, 2009, in Germany. It was written, arranged and recorded between 2008 and 2009. The album is Christmas-themed, consisting of traditional holiday favorites made into heavy metal fashion along with a few original arrangements by Rob Halford and producer/guitarist Roy Z.

== Singles ==
The first single, "Get into the Spirit", was released on September 29, 2009. In 2019, Halford released a second Christmas-themed album entitled Celestial, although this was recorded with family and friends rather than his usual bandmates.

== Track listing ==
All songs arranged by Rob Halford, Roy Z, Ed Roth, John Baxter.

No.	Title	Writer(s)	Length
1.	"Get into the Spirit"	Rob Halford, Roy Z, John Baxter	5:26
2.	"We Three Kings"	John Henry Hopkins Jr.	4:06
3.	"Oh Come, O Come, Emanuel"	John Mason Neale	4:38
4.	"Winter Song"	Sara Bareilles, Ingrid Michaelson	5:38
5.	"What Child Is This?"	William Chatterton Dix	4:27
6.	"Christmas for Everyone"	R. Halford, Roy Z	3:06
7.	"I Don't Care"	R. Halford	3:14
8.	"Light of the World"	R. Halford	4:13
9.	"Oh Holy Night"	Adolphe Adam	4:09
10.	"Come All Ye Faithful"	John Francis Wade	2:27

== Personnel ==
Halford

- Rob Halford – vocals
- Roy Z – guitar
- Metal Mike Chlasciak – guitar
- Mike Davis – bass
- Bobby Jarzombek – drums

Additional performer

- Ed Roth – keyboards

Production

- Produced and engineered by Roy Z
- Executive producer – John Baxter
- Mixed and engineered by Pete Martinez
- Sound design, percussion, and engineering by John Mattox
- Drum tuning by Mike Fassano
- Mastered by Maor Appelbaum
- Graphic direction, web marketing, and design by Attila Juhasz
- Cover illustration and packaging design by Marc Sasso
- Photography by John Eder, Marc Sasso, David Hildreth, and John Baxter

== Charts ==
Chart (2009)	Peak position
US Heatseekers Albums (Billboard)	22
