= Halford (band) =

American heavy metal band

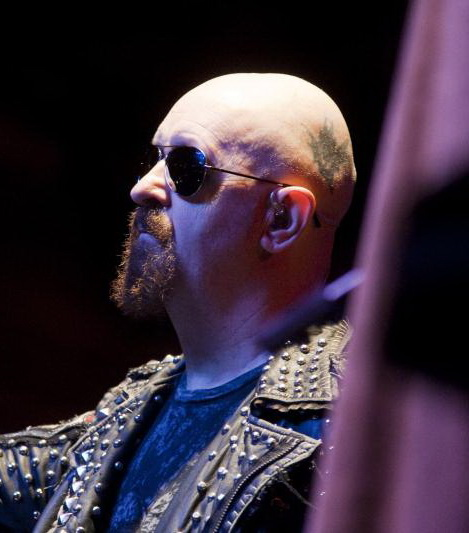
- Frontman Rob Halford in 2010

Background information
- Origin: Phoenix, Arizona, U.S.
- Genres: Heavy metal
- Years active: 1999–present
- Labels: Metal God Entertainment
- Members: Rob Halford; Roy Z; Mike Chlasciak; Mike Davis; Bobby Jarzombek
- Past members: Jason Ward; Chad Tarrington; Ray Riendeau; Pete Parada; Patrick Lachman

Halford is an American heavy metal band formed in 1999 by English singer Rob Halford, who is best known as the lead vocalist for heavy metal band Judas Priest. Halford formed the band to return to his heavy metal roots. His two previous projects were a "street metal"-style band called Fight and the industrial metal band 2wo.

== Recordings ==
Halford's first album, Resurrection, was released in 2000 to critical acclaim. It was subsequently included in Martin Popoff's The Top 500 Heavy Metal Albums of All Time. In addition, the songs "Silent Screams" and the title-track "Resurrection" were included in Popoff's list. The track "The One You Love to Hate" featured vocalist Bruce Dickinson of metal band Iron Maiden.

In 2002, Halford released its second studio album Crucible. Although no live recordings have been officially released to promote this album, a high-quality soundboard bootleg titled Live: From the Disney House of Blues, was made available for download at robhalford.com in 2004. Halford released bonus tracks in Japan, such as "She", "Fugitive", "Rock the World Forever", and "In the Morning".

In November 2006, Halford released a single titled "Forgotten Generation". The first wave of Halford re-releases included remastered editions of the band's back catalog, initially released through the iTunes Store. Fight also released an early recording entitled K5 – The War of Words Demos, dating back to the formation of Fight. The compilation Metal God Essentials Vol. 1 not only included the fans' favorite Halford songs, but also the new recordings "Forgotten Generation" and "Drop Out".

Halford's third record, Halford III: Winter Songs, was released on November 3, 2009. The record features tracks recorded between 2008–2009, as well as traditional Christmas songs re-arranged to heavy metal renditions by Rob Halford himself. The first single "Get Into the Spirit" was released to radios on September 29, 2009. On June 25, 2010, Halford released "The Mower", the first single from the studio album Halford IV: Made of Metal, which was released in September 2010.

== Band members ==
Current

- Rob Halford – vocals (1999–present)
- Mike Chlasciak – guitars (1999–present)
- Bobby Jarzombek – drums (2000–present)
- Mike Davis – bass (2003–present)
- Roy Z – guitars (2003–present)

Former

- Ray Riendeau – bass (1999–2002)
- Pete Parada – drums (1999–2000)
- Patrick Lachman – guitars (1999–2002)
- Chad Tarrington – guitars (2003)
- Jason Ward – bass (2003)

== Discography ==
- Resurrection (2000)
- Crucible (2002)
- Halford III: Winter Songs (2009)
- Halford IV: Made of Metal (2010)
