= Rob Halford =

English heavy metal singer (born 1951)

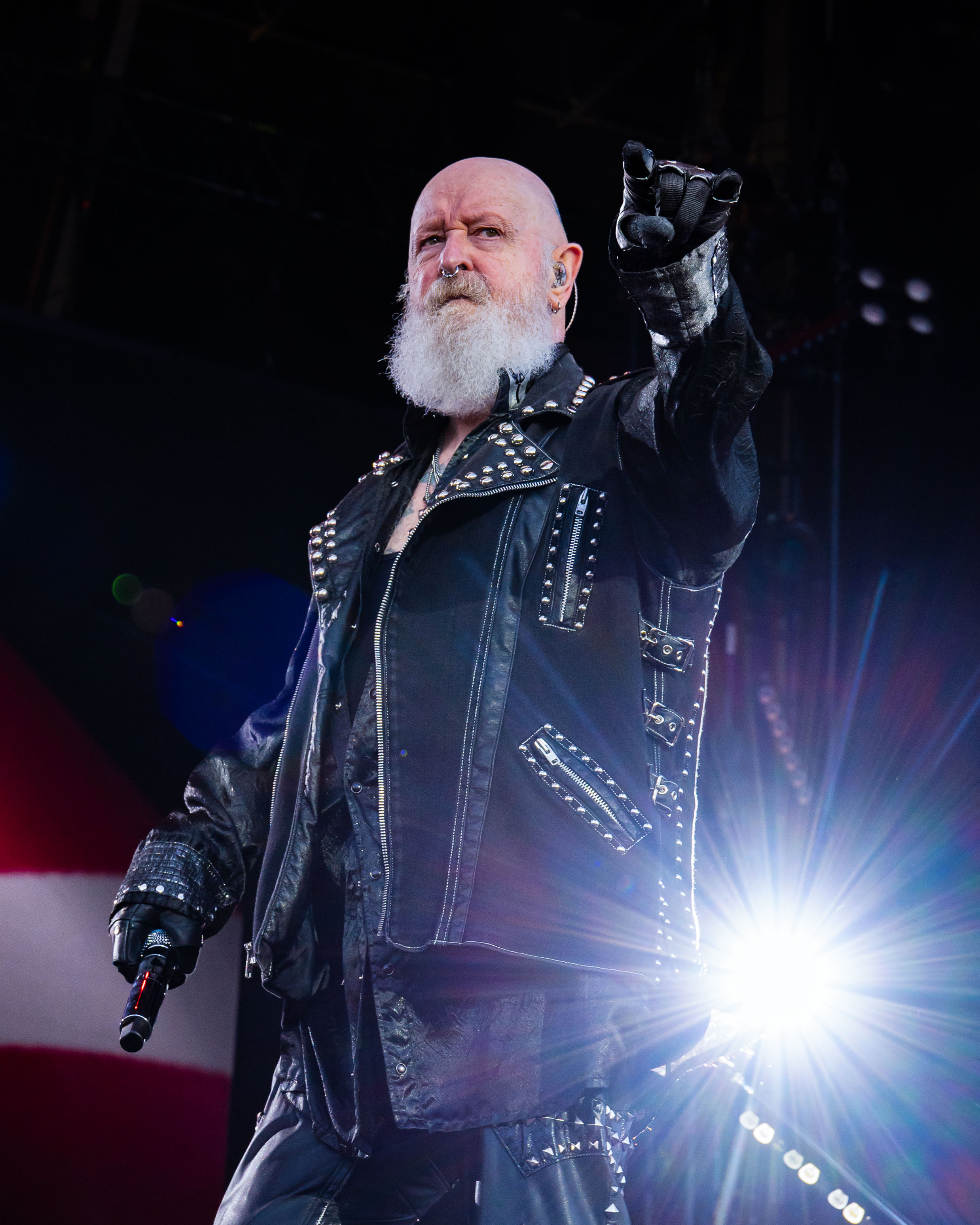
- Halford in 2024

Background information
- Also known as: Metal God
- Born: Robert John Arthur Halford; 25 August 1951 (age 75); Sutton Coldfield, Warwickshire, England
- Origin: Walsall, West Midlands, England
- Genre: Heavy metal
- Occupations: Singer; songwriter
- Years active: 1969–present
- Member of: Judas Priest; Halford
- Formerly of: Fight; 2wo; Lord Lucifer; Hiroshima
- Spouse: Thomas Pence (m. 2024)

Robert John Arthur Halford (born 25 August 1951) is an English heavy metal singer. He is the lead vocalist of Judas Priest, which he joined in 1973, and has received accolades such as the 2010 Grammy Award for Best Metal Performance. He is noted for his powerful and wide-ranging operatic style and trademark leather-and-studs image, both of which have become iconic in heavy metal. His side projects include Fight, Two and Halford.

Halford is often regarded as one of the greatest metal frontmen and singers of all time. AllMusic said, "There have been few vocalists in the history of heavy metal whose singing style has been as influential and instantly recognizable... able to effortlessly alternate between a throaty growl and an ear-splitting falsetto." He was ranked at No. 33 on the list of greatest voices in rock by Planet Rock listeners in 2009. He has also been nicknamed "Metal God" by fans. He was inducted into the Rock and Roll Hall of Fame as a member of Judas Priest in 2022, via the Award for Musical Excellence.

== Career ==
=== Early years ===
Robert John Arthur Halford was born on 25 August 1951 in Sutton Coldfield. He grew up in nearby Walsall, where he was raised on the Beechdale housing estate; the estate was also home to Noddy Holder.

=== Judas Priest ===
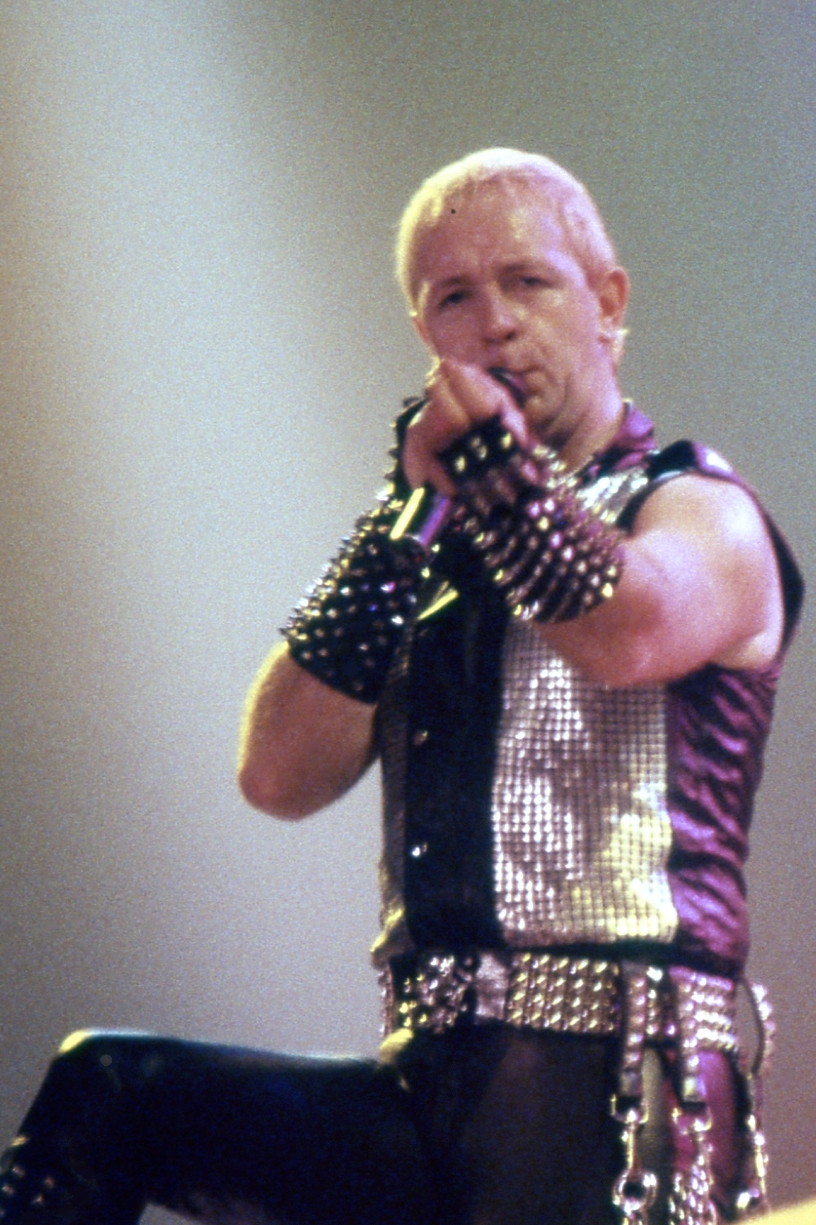
Halford in 1984

Halford was introduced to Judas Priest bassist and co-founder Ian Hill by his sister Sue, who was dating Hill at the time. Halford, a manager of a men's clothing store, joined the band as singer, bringing with him drummer John Hinch from his previous band Hiroshima. Halford and Hinch played their first show with Judas Priest in May 1973 at the Townhouse in Wellington, Shropshire. The show was recorded and part of it released in 2019 on the compilation Downer-Rock Asylum on the Audio Archives label.

In 1974, he made his recording debut on the band's first album Rocka Rolla. He continued to front Judas Priest throughout the 1970s and 1980s. In 1990, Halford emerged with all-new tattoos, including a bent Judas Priest cross on his right arm and ring around his other, as well as a few on his shoulders. He also began shaving his head.

On the last date of the tour for Painkiller in August 1991 at a show in Toronto, Halford rode onstage on a large Harley-Davidson motorcycle, dressed in motorcycle leathers, as part of the show. The stage riser malfunctioned and he collided with a half-raised drum riser and fell off it, breaking his nose in the process. He was left unconscious for a short time while the band was performing the first song. After regaining consciousness, Halford returned and finished the show. Halford had been wanting to do a solo project and had the blessing of his band members to do so. A studio executive told him he would have to technically 'resign' from Judas Priest to do so and he wrote a statement citing his interest in a solo project. The letter was leaked and taken out of context in that he was quitting the band. Due to personal challenges with conflict, he was unable to clarify what happened and it was over ten years before he reconnected with the band and rejoined.

=== Fight ===
Shortly after Halford's departure, he formed the band Fight with Judas Priest drummer Scott Travis, bassist Jack "Jay Jay" Brown and guitarists Brian Tilse and Russ Parrish. The first album War of Words was released in 1993, followed by the half live, half remixes EP Mutations in 1994. A tour took place in support of the album in 1994. The second album A Small Deadly Space was released in 1995, with a tour taking place in support of that album as well. While War of Words was a straightforward metal record, A Small Deadly Space had a grungier sound, making it less appealing to fans who had developed a taste for War of Words. As the band were preparing to begin work on the third album, they split up, thus ending their business with their label Epic Records. A brief reunion with half of the original members took place on 20 December 1997 for a one-off performance before disbanding once again. In a 2015 interview, Halford contemplated Fight's reformation.

=== 2wo ===
In 1997, Halford collaborated with guitarist John Lowery to form an industrial-influenced band called 2wo. They released their only album Voyeurs in 1998, which was produced by Dave Ogilvie and released on Trent Reznor's Nothing Records label.

=== Halford ===
In 1999, Halford returned to his metal roots and formed a solo band. The album Resurrection was released in 2000 to critical acclaim. The band embarked on a tour with Iron Maiden and Queensrÿche to support the album. A live album titled Live Insurrection was released in 2001. It was followed up by the second album Crucible in 2002. In 2010, Halford released a live DVD titled Live in Anaheim and the fourth studio album Halford IV: Made of Metal.

=== Reunion with Judas Priest ===
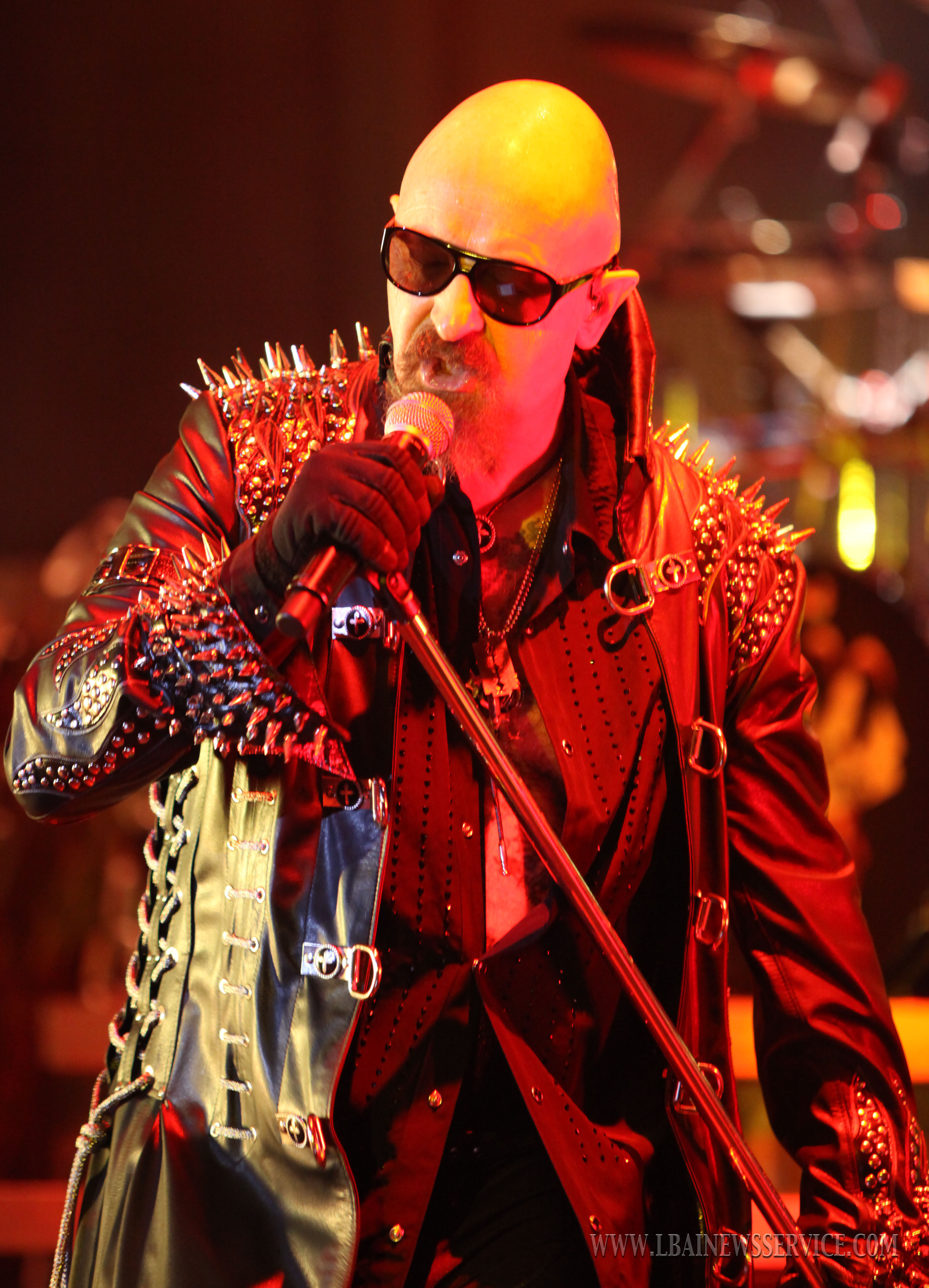
Halford performing in 2014

Halford's reunion with Judas Priest came about from years of speculation about when he was no longer in the line-up, at least since the release of the Resurrection album, which some critics claimed sounded more like Judas Priest than the band's previous album Jugulator (1997). Halford initially ruled it out, but then reconsidered, stating in 2002 that "Gut instinct tells me that at some point it will happen".

In July 2003, Halford returned to Judas Priest and embarked on a tour in 2004 in celebration of his return. The band released Angel of Retribution in 2005. A world tour accompanied the release and marked the band's 30th anniversary. In 2008, Nostradamus was released.

In 2011, Judas Priest embarked upon what was billed as their final world tour as a group, titled the Epitaph Tour. Subsequent to the tour's announcement, Halford stated that he would continue to move forward with his solo band.

Despite the "final tour" announcement in 2011, Halford and Judas Priest (minus K. K. Downing, who left the group prior to the Epitaph tour) recorded another album, Redeemer of Souls, which was released in 2014, the album supported by a concert tour.

In 2017, Judas Priest began to work on another studio album with Halford. The album Firepower was released 9 March 2018.

=== Live appearances ===
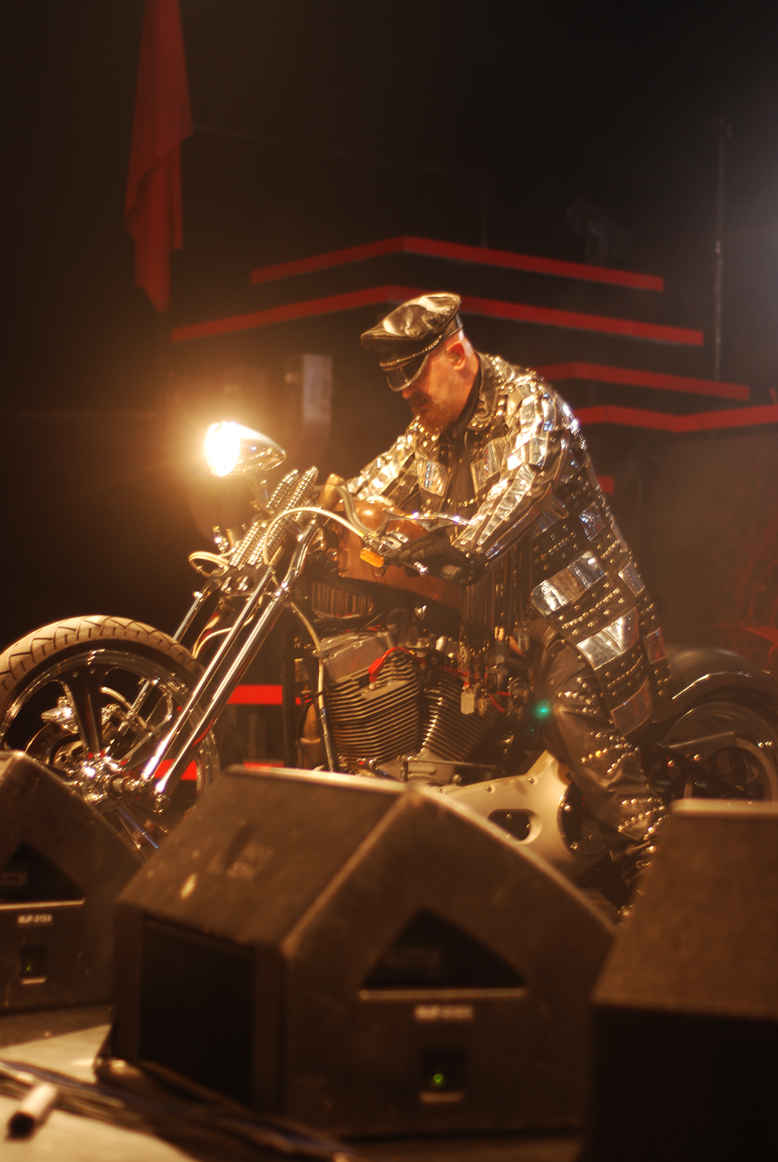
Halford often rides a motorcycle onstage.

Halford performed as the vocalist for Black Sabbath for three shows. He replaced Ronnie James Dio for two nights in November 1992, when Dio elected not to open a show for Ozzy Osbourne. Halford also filled in for Osbourne in Black Sabbath on 26 August 2004 (one day after Halford's 53rd birthday) at an Ozzfest show in Camden, New Jersey, since Osbourne could not perform due to bronchitis.

Halford joined Sum 41 on stage in 2001 for a televised concert for MTV's 20th anniversary with drummer Tommy Lee to perform "You've Got Another Thing Comin'" as the final song of a medley.

Halford joined Metallica on stage three times where they performed the song "Rapid Fire"; in 1994 on the last date of the Shit Hits the Sheds Tour, in 2011 at The Fillmore for the band's 30th anniversary celebration and in 2013 at the fifth annual Revolver Golden Gods awards in Los Angeles.

Halford joined Pantera on stage twice. The first performance was in 1992 where he sang on the songs "Metal Gods" and "Grinder", and again in 1997 where he sang on "Grinder".

Halford joined queercore band Pansy Division on stage in July 1997 to perform the song "Breaking the Law".

Halford joined Babymetal on stage on 18 July 2016 at the Alternative Press Music Awards in Cleveland where they performed a medley of "Painkiller" and "Breaking the Law".

=== Other activities ===
Halford made an appearance in the 2002 film Spun where he played an employee at a sex shop. Halford had previously worked as a manager at an adult movie theatre prior to joining Judas Priest.

In 2006, Halford split with Sanctuary Records and founded Metal God Entertainment to produce and licence any future material. All Fight and Halford material were released in remastered format, which also includes DVDs from both bands.

Halford provided voice-over for the characters General Lionwhyte and the leader of the Fire Barons on the 2009 video game Brütal Legend. The Baron's appearance and personality are based on Halford.

Halford developed the clothing line Metal God Apparel with plans to develop retail sales through 2010.

Halford had a brief cameo in a 2010 commercial for Virgin Mobile, where he appeared as a priest.

In 2019, Halford was working on an autobiography. The autobiography, titled Confess, was originally announced to be published in October 2020, but received its official date for 29 September 2020 via Hachette Books. In August 2020, Halford confirmed that he had completed an audiobook version of the publication, to be made available at the same time as the physical release.

Halford has appeared as himself, representing the character Kevin's conscience, in the 2022 American teen comedy-drama Metal Lords.

== Personal life ==
=== Hobbies ===
Halford divides his time between homes in the United States and his home town of Walsall. He is a supporter of the Phoenix Suns of the NBA and the Arizona Cardinals of the NFL. Halford enjoys listening to metal and rock acts such as Dio and Queen along with classical music.

Halford owns a 1970s Aston Martin DBS, a Chevrolet Corvette, and a Mercury Cougar. He did not get a driving licence until the age of 38. In 2010, he said that his main car was a 2006 Cadillac DTS.

In May 2021, Halford was made a Kentucky Colonel by Andy Beshear.

=== Sexuality ===
Halford publicly revealed his homosexuality on MTV in 1998. He broke down in tears saying, "It's a wonderful moment when you walk out of the closet. Now I've done that and I've freed myself. It's a great feeling for me to finally let go and make this statement—especially to The Advocate, because this magazine has brought me so much comfort over the years. Obviously this is just a wonderful day for me." Halford later explained that he did not have a plan or an agenda when coming in to do his interview with MTV. He mainly spoke about and promoted the Voyeurs album he made with guitarist John 5, when he slipped out his sexuality after being asked a question from the studio's producer. He cited it being "kind of a big leap forward".

At the time Halford revealed his sexuality, he was concerned that he would lose his fanbase as a result. He explained that he cannot return to certain locations for fear of stoning. He described the 1970s and 1980s as "incredibly difficult", but not counting it as important music-wise. Halford jokingly claimed that he cannot be replaced by a straight man, bringing up late Queen vocalist Freddie Mercury, saying that "if Freddie hadn't have been gay, Queen would've been a totally different band. But that's a really important part of my life that I have to get down on paper at some point." Halford describes himself as "the stately homo of heavy metal", and said that coming out was accidental but "the greatest thing I could have done for myself". He also explained that he did not do so sooner due to the fear that it was going to be troublesome for him.

Halford speaks negatively about the discrimination homosexuals face in some parts of the world. Halford said that after he completed his interview, he began to fear negative reactions but was quickly inundated with messages of support from colleagues and fans. Halford has spoken about the level of acceptance of his sexuality within the metal community, calling it accepting and inclusive. In 2018, Halford stated that society had not changed as much as he had hoped in terms of equality since his coming out: "You'd think there would have been some kind of change and people would have moved on after such a long time. Now that I'm moving through my OAP heavy metal years (laughs), I thought a lot of [discrimination] would be gone by now. And it's a shame. We don't really get to spend a lot of time on this planet together, so there's no point in wasting it being divided."

The subject matter of his lyrics had not changed since his coming out, and he avoided addressing it in Judas Priest's lyrics. However, the song "Raw Deal" from the 1977 album Sin After Sin speaks about Fire Island in New York, which was famous in the 1970s and 1980s as a community for gay men. He felt that the lyrics were "just too much", but they were approved by the other members of the band. "But you listen to that song, it really is almost like a coming-out experience for me. And it never really registered. It's only been in recent years that people have picked up on that song," he said.

In September 2020, Halford revealed how in 1992 he had a "George Michael moment" when he was arrested for public indecency in a men's bathroom commonly used for casual sex in Venice Beach, California. An officer who was a fan of Judas Priest helped keep the arrest from wide publicity.

In 2024, Halford married his husband, Thomas; they had been a couple for thirty years.

=== Health ===
In the Behind the Music documentary series, Halford said that hiding his sexuality during Judas Priest's career caused him a lot of depression and isolation which led to his alcohol and drug abuse.

During the making of the band's 1986 album Turbo, Halford struggled with increasing substance abuse and violent feuds with his romantic partner. The singer entered rehab in January 1986 following a painkiller overdose and even managed to stay sober after his partner died by suicide. He says that he has been clean and sober since then. He made an energetic recovery and his live performances during the subsequent Fuel for Life Tour were described as some of his strongest ever.

Halford was born and raised in a Christian household, and said that his upbringing "has become more important since I became clean and sober on 6 January 1986. That was 25 years ago and I think that's probably more important to me now, on a daily basis."

When asked in 2016 what part sobriety has played in the band's longevity, he responded, "Without it? Oh, I'd be dead. Literally, I would be dead."

Despite being clean and sober since 1986, he confessed that he did have the desire to "have a drink" and "have a smoke and do a line. I wish I could do all that, but I can't. I've done all that. I've done all that and it nearly killed me. I wish I could do that because when I'm with my friends and they're having a good time and there's this little devil on your shoulder, 'Just have a quick shot. Do a shot of Jack.'" He pointed out to those who are recovering from their abuse about dealing with the "little devil on your shoulder or the monkey on your back", and that being clean and sober was "the greatest gift I was given. It was a gift. I can't do this by myself. There's another source helping. That's just a thrill to share with the music at this point."

Halford underwent back surgery in 2013 and umbilical hernia surgery in 2014.

Halford suffered from prostate cancer during the COVID-19 lockdowns after experiencing symptoms in 2017. He underwent prostatectomy in July 2020. After more cancer was found, he went through radiation treatments in April and May that year and was cleared in June before travelling to England to visit family. He also had an appendectomy after a tumour was discovered in his appendix.

== Singing style and influences ==
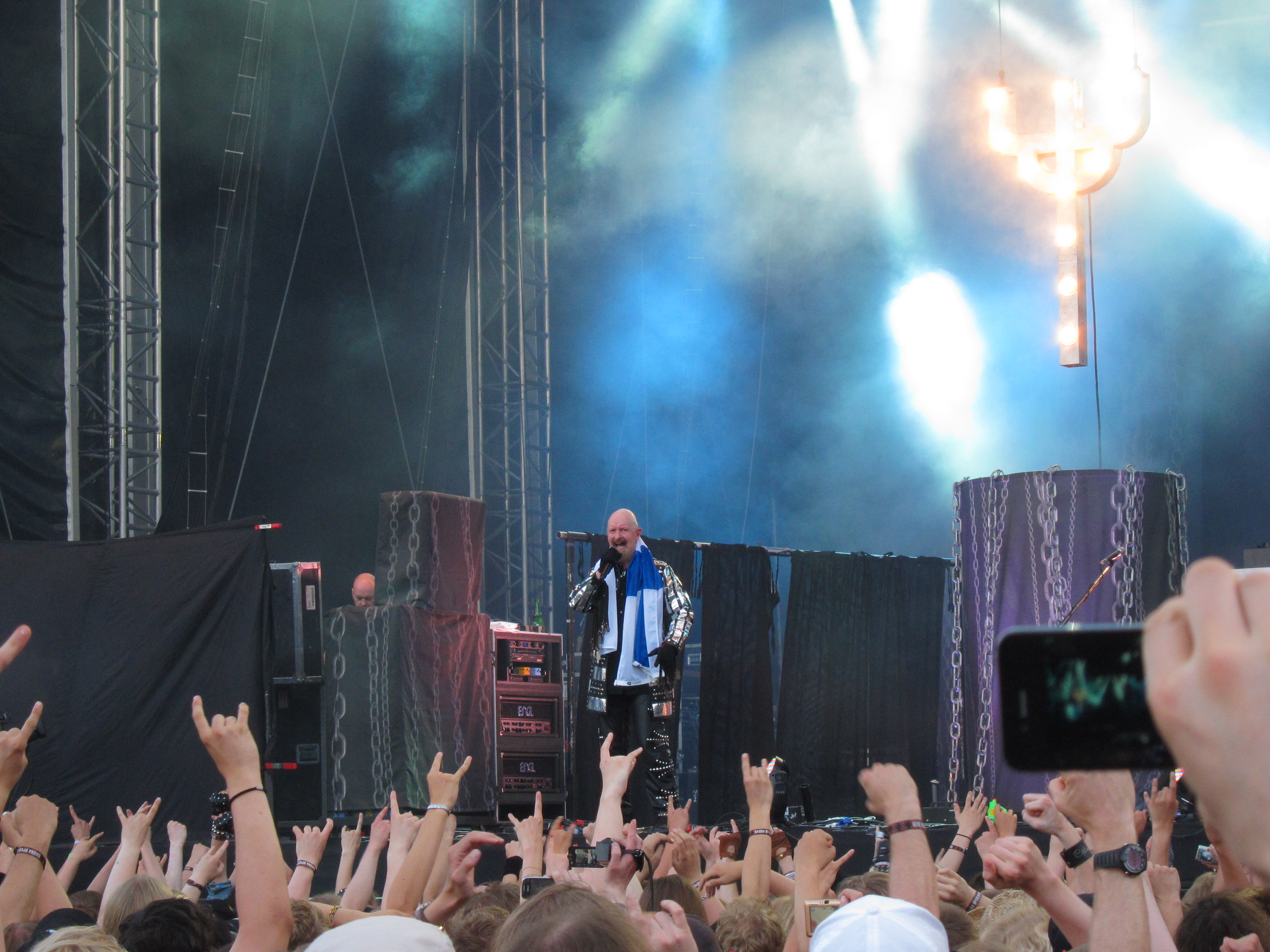
Halford performing at Sauna Open Air in 2011 during Judas Priest's Epitaph World Tour

Along with Ronnie James Dio and Bruce Dickinson, Halford is one of the pioneers of the operatic vocal style later adopted by power metal vocalists and regularly appears near the top in lists of the greatest metal vocalists and frontmen of all time. In 2023, Rolling Stone ranked Halford at number 129 on its list of the 200 Greatest Singers of All Time.

Halford described himself as "a huge Queen fan" since they began and saw their very early shows. He called Freddie Mercury, the original lead singer of the band, his "ultimate hero" and expressed regret that he never got to know him well.

As a vocalist, Halford was influenced by Little Richard, Elvis Presley, Janis Joplin and Robert Plant. He was also influenced by the music of Jimi Hendrix, the Beatles, Cream, David Bowie, King Crimson, the Rolling Stones, John Mayall, and Alice Cooper.

== Discography ==
=== Judas Priest ===
- Rocka Rolla (1974)
- Sad Wings of Destiny (1976)
- Sin After Sin (1977)
- Stained Class (1978)
- Killing Machine (1978)
- Unleashed in the East (1979)
- British Steel (1980)
- Point of Entry (1981)
- Screaming for Vengeance (1982)
- Defenders of the Faith (1984)
- Turbo (1986)
- Priest...Live! (1987)
- Ram It Down (1988)
- Painkiller (1990)
- Angel of Retribution (2005)
- Nostradamus (2008)
- A Touch of Evil: Live (2009)
- Redeemer of Souls (2014)
- Battle Cry (2016)
- Firepower (2018)
- Invincible Shield (2024)

=== Fight ===
- K5 – The War of Words Demos (1992) (released in 2007)
- War of Words (1993)
- Mutations (1994)
- A Small Deadly Space (1995)

=== 2wo ===
- Voyeurs (1998)

=== Halford ===
- Resurrection (2000)
- Live Insurrection (2001)
- Crucible (2002)
- Metal God Essentials, Vol. 1 (2007)
- Halford III: Winter Songs (2009)
- Live in Anaheim (2010)
- Halford IV: Made of Metal (2010)

Miscellaneous

- The Complete Albums Collection (2017)

=== Rob Halford with Family and Friends ===
- Celestial (2019)

=== Guest appearances ===
- Krokus – Headhunter – backing vocals on "Ready to Burn" (1983)
- Surgical Steel – Surgical Steel (demo), vocals on "Smooth and Fast" (1984)
- Hear 'n Aid (1986)
- Recorded the song "Light comes out of Black" with Pantera for the Buffy the Vampire Slayer soundtrack (1992)
- Ugly Kid Joe – America's Least Wanted – backing vocals on "Goddamn Devil" (1992)
- Skid Row – B-Side Ourselves – vocals on "Delivering the Goods" in a live version (1992)
- Background vocals on the song "Hex 'n' Sex" for the album with the same title by the German band Brings (1993)
- Bullring Brummies, a studio session line-up that came together to contribute to the Nativity in Black tribute compilation album of Black Sabbath cover songs (1994)
- Queens of the Stone Age – Rated R – vocals on "Feel Good Hit of the Summer" (2000)
- Furious IV – Is That You? (2002)
- Spun motion picture (2002) – "Pornclerk" character
- Brütal Legend (2009) – Voicing the main villain Emperor Doviculus' minion General Lionwhyte, who is strongly based on the culture of glam metal. Also voiced the leader of the Fire Barons, who was directly modelled after his younger appearance
- Five Finger Death Punch's album The Wrong Side of Heaven and the Righteous Side of Hell, Volume 1 (2013) – guest vocals on "Lift Me Up", performed live in Revolver Golden God Awards (2013)
- Ronnie James Dio tribute album, This Is Your Life (2014) – vocals on "Man on the Silver Mountain"
- The Simpsons – Singing a rendition of "Breaking the Law" titled "Respecting the Law" in the episode "Steal This Episode" (2014)
- In This Moment's album Ritual (2017) – vocals on "Black Wedding"
- Phil Campbell – Old Lions Still Roar (2019) – vocals on "Straight Up"
- Dolly Parton, Rockstar (2023) - featured vocals on "Bygones"

== Awards and nominations ==
Halford has been inducted into the Rock and Roll Hall of Fame, Metal Hall of Fame and Kerrang! Hall of Fame as a member of Judas Priest.

Year	Award	Category	Result
2010	Revolver Golden Gods Awards	Golden God	Won
2015	Loudwire Music Awards	Rock Titan of the Year	Nominated
2015	Loudwire Music Awards	Vocalist of the Year	Nominated
2017	Loudwire Music Awards	Lemmy Lifetime Achievement Award	Won
2017	Metal Hammer Germany Awards	Legend Award	Nominated
