= List of the Dead Daisies members =

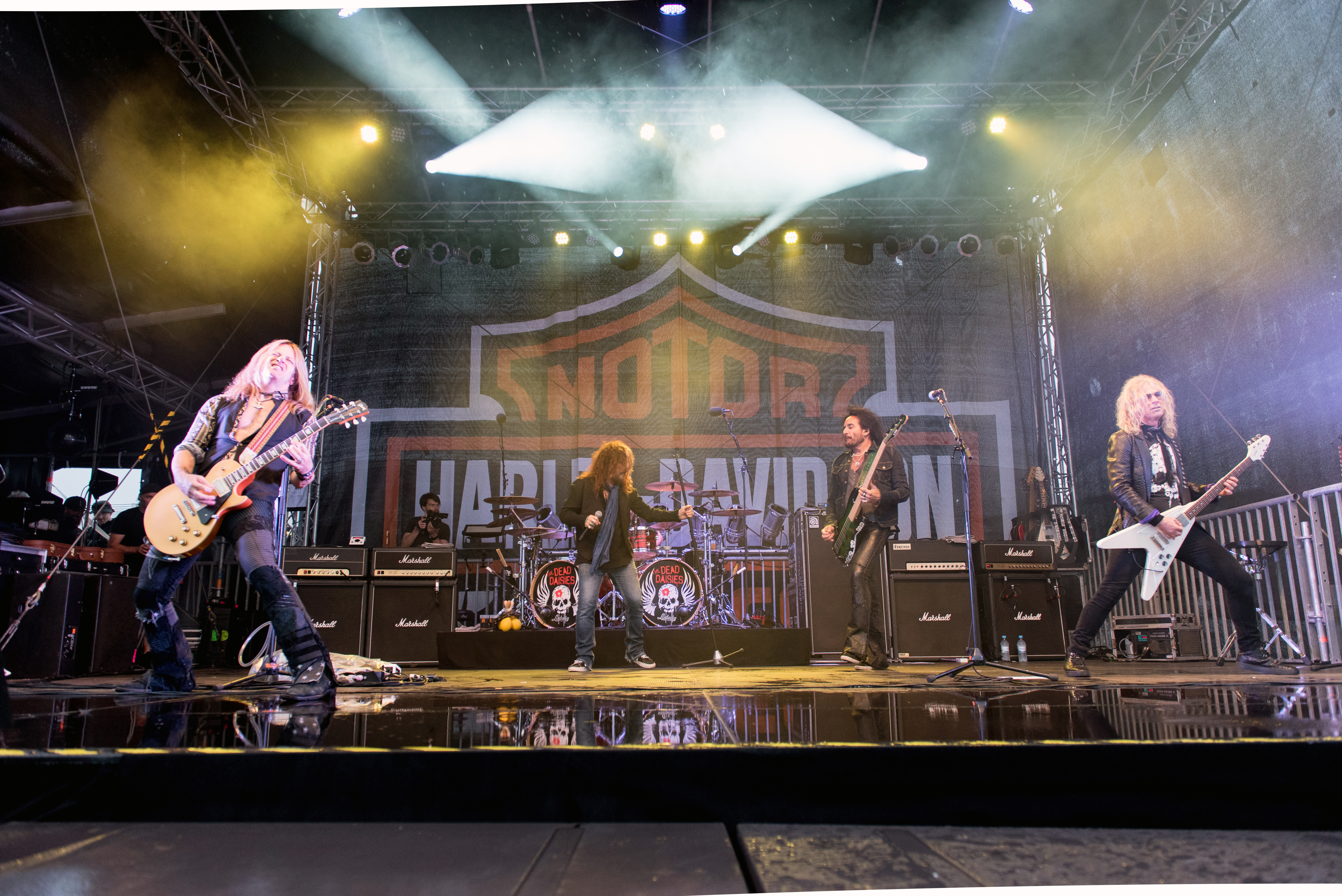
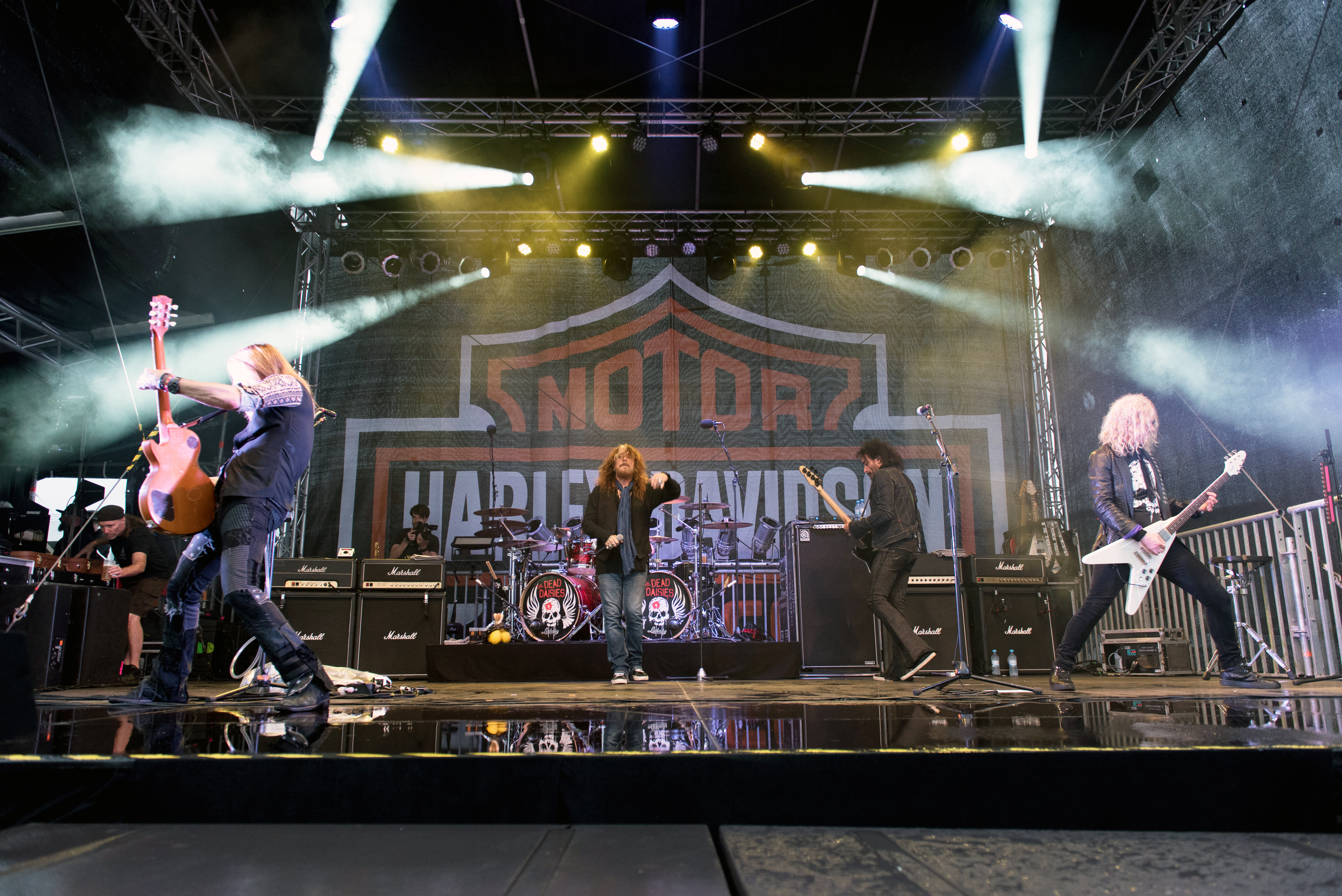
The Dead Daisies performing in 2017

The Dead Daisies are an Australian-American hard rock band. Formed in Sydney in 2013, the group were initially a duo composed of David Lowy and Jon Stevens, who recorded a self-titled debut album with session musicians. The band's first touring lineup included guitarist Richard Fortus, bassist Jim Hilbun, drummer Charley Drayton and keyboardist Alan Mansfield. The current lineup of the Dead Daisies features Lowy, guitarist Doug Aldrich (since 2016), drummer Tommy Clufetos (first 2015, then from 2021 to 2022, and since 2024), singer Kelly Hansen and bassist Jimi Crutchley (both since 2026).

== History ==
=== 2013–2015 ===
David Lowy and Jon Stevens formed the Dead Daisies in 2013, and recorded the band's self-titled debut album in 2013 with session musicians. The first touring lineup of the group, which performed in March 2013, included Guns N' Roses guitarist Richard Fortus, former Angels bassist Jim Hilbun, Cold Chisel drummer Charley Drayton and former Dragon keyboardist Alan Mansfield. Hilbun and Mansfield were replaced in April by Marco Mendoza and Clayton Doley, respectively, and Alex Carapetis took over from Drayton in May. In June, Dizzy Reed replaced Doley on keyboards, and in August Frank Ferrer replaced Carapetis. The following month, Brian Tichy first replaced Frank Ferrer, then Darryl Jones took over from Mendoza, respectively on drums and bass guitar.

By October 2013, Drayton had return to The Dead Daisies. In January 2014, Mendoza returned to the band and Jones returned to the Rolling Stones. In February, the Cult's John Tempesta replaced Drayton. He remained until May, when Tichy returned. The group's lineup remained stable for the rest of the year, until founding member Stevens left in February 2015, replaced by John Corabi and Bernard Fowler, while Jones returned on bass. Corabi remained for the recording of Revolución, which began in March with Jackie Barnes temporarily filling in for Tichy. When the band returned to touring, Tommy Clufetos of Ozzy Osbourne's band had taken over the position of drummer. In April, it was announced that Corabi had officially replaced Stevens as lead vocalist.

=== Since 2015 ===
For an Australian tour in October 2015, long-running guitarist Fortus was temporarily replaced by Dave Leslie after suffering injuries in a motorcycle accident. Tichy also returned. By January 2016, Fortus and Reed had left the Dead Daisies permanently to take part in the Guns N' Roses Not in This Lifetime... Tour, with Doug Aldrich (formerly of Dio and Whitesnake) taking over on lead guitar. The group released their third studio album Make Some Noise in 2016 and their first live album Live & Louder in 2017, then former Journey drummer Deen Castronovo joined in November 2017. The band released their fourth studio album Burn It Down in April 2018. In August 2019, former Deep Purple and Black Sabbath bassist and vocalist Glenn Hughes joined, as both Corabi and Mendoza left.

With Hughes as their new frontman, the band issued The Lockdown Sessions EP in July 2020, followed by their fifth album Holy Ground in January 2021. Just two days after its release, it was announced that Castronovo had left due to "medical issues", with Tommy Clufetos returning to take his place on subsequent tour dates. A year later, Clufetos was replaced by former drummer Brian Tichy for a third tenure. In May 2023, Corabi returned and former Whitesnake bassist Michael Devin joined. In March 2024, Tichy was replaced by Clufetos for his second tenure. Corabi left the band in July 2026.

== Official band members ==
=== Current ===
Image	Name	Years active	Instruments	Release contributions
	David Lowy	2013–present	guitar (rhythm since 2013, lead 2013)	all Dead Daisies releases
	Tommy Clufetos	2015 (touring); 2021–2022; 2024–present	drums	Live Plus Five (2026)
	Doug Aldrich	2016–present	lead guitar; backing vocals	all Dead Daisies releases from Make Some Noise (2016) onwards
	Kelly Hansen	2026–present	lead vocals	"Lift Me Up" (2026)
	Jimi Crutchley	2026–present	bass	

=== Former ===
Image	Name	Years active	Instruments	Release contributions
	Jon Stevens	2013–2015	lead vocals; rhythm guitar	The Dead Daisies (2013); Face I Love (2014); Locked and Loaded (2019)
	Richard Fortus	2013–2016	lead guitar; backing vocals	Face I Love (2014); Revolución (2015); Locked and Loaded (2019)
	Charley Drayton	2013; 2013–2014	drums	none
	Alan Mansfield (died 2024)	2013	keyboards	none
	Jim Hilbun	2013	bass; backing vocals	none
	Marco Mendoza	2013; 2014–2019	bass; backing vocals	all Dead Daisies releases from Face I Love (2014) to Locked and Loaded (2019)
	Clayton Doley	2013	keyboards; backing vocals	none
	Alex Carapetis	2013	drums	none
	Dizzy Reed	2013–2016	keyboards; backing vocals	Face I Love (2014); Revolución (2015); Locked and Loaded (2019)
	Frank Ferrer	2013	drums	Face I Love (2014)
	Brian Tichy	2013; 2014–2017; 2022–2024	drums	Revolución (2015) – two tracks only; Make Some Noise (2016); Live & Louder (2017); The Covers EP (2017); Locked and Loaded (2019); Radiance (2022); Live from Daisyland (2022)
	Darryl Jones	2013–2014; 2015 (touring)	bass; backing vocals	none
	John Tempesta	2014	drums	none
	John Corabi	2015 (touring); 2015–2019; 2023–2026	lead vocals; acoustic guitar	all Dead Daisies releases from Revolución (2015) to Locked and Loaded (2019) and Light 'Em Up (2024)
	Deen Castronovo	2017–2021	drums; backing and occasional lead vocals	Burn It Down (2018); Locked and Loaded (2019); The Lockdown Sessions (2020); Holy Ground (2021)
	Glenn Hughes	2019–2023 (guest 2026)	lead vocals; bass	The Lockdown Sessions (2020); Holy Ground (2021); Radiance (2022); Live from Daisyland (2022)
	Michael Devin	2023–2026	bass; backing vocals	Light 'Em Up (2024); Lookin' for Trouble (2025); Live Plus Five (2026)

== Temporary substitutes ==
=== Touring ===
Image	Name	Years active	Instruments	Details
	Bernard Fowler	2015	lead and backing vocals	Fowler and John Corabi were drafted in as replacements for Jon Stevens for 2015 shows in Cuba.
	Damon Johnson	2015	rhythm guitar	Johnson temporarily replaced David Lowy for shows in July and August 2015 supporting Whitesnake.
	Dave Leslie	2015	lead guitar	Leslie filled in on lead guitar for a short tour in October 2015, after Richard Fortus suffered an injury.
	Yogi Lonich	2016; 2017; 2022	rhythm guitar (2016 and 2017); bass (2022)	Lonich temporarily replaced David Lowy on two occasions, and later substituted for Hughes.
	Dino Jelusick	2022	lead vocals	Jelusick took over vocals from Hughes when he was forced to step back after contracting COVID-19.
	Reb Beach	2024	lead guitar	Beach filling in on lead guitar while Aldrich gets cancer treatment.
	Brent Fitz	2025	drums	Fitz filled in for Clufetos on the band's European tour during the summer of 2025.

=== Session ===
Image	Name	Years active	Instruments	Release contributions
	John Fields	2013	bass; guitar; keyboards; percussion	The Dead Daisies (2013)
	Dorian Crozier	2013	drums	The Dead Daisies (2013)
	Kevin Savigar	2013	keyboards	The Dead Daisies (2013)
	Vanessa Amorosi	2013	additional vocals	The Dead Daisies (2013)
	Isaac Carpenter	2013	drums	The Dead Daisies (2013) — two tracks only
	Slash	2013	lead guitar	The Dead Daisies (2013) — one track only
	Simon Hosford	2013	bass; guitar	The Dead Daisies (2013) — one track only
	Johnny Salerno	2013	drums	The Dead Daisies (2013) — one track only
	Jackie Barnes	2015	drums	Revolución (2015)
	Yaimi Karell Lay	2015	percussion	Revolución (2015) — two tracks only
	Jimmy Barnes	2015	additional vocals	Revolución (2015) — one track only
	Marti Frederiksen	2016; 2017; 2024; 2025	keyboards; percussion; backing vocals	Make Some Noise (2016); Burn It Down (2018); Light 'Em Up (2024); Lookin' for Trouble (2025)
	Suzie McNeil	2016	harmonica; backing vocals	Make Some Noise (2016)
	Vince DiCola	2021; 2022	keyboards; orchestration	Holy Ground (2021); Radiance (2022)
	Ben Grosse	2021; 2022	keyboards; programming	Holy Ground (2021); Radiance (2022)
	Kenny Meriedeth	2021; 2022	orchestration	Holy Ground (2021); Radiance (2022)
	Bernie Barlow	2021; 2022	backing vocals	Holy Ground (2021); Radiance (2022)
	Peter Kadar	2024; 2025	keyboards	Light 'Em Up (2024) — one track only; Lookin' for Trouble (2025)
	Evan Frederiksen	2024	drums	Light 'Em Up (2024)
	Sarah Tomek	2025	drums	Lookin' For Trouble (2025)

== Lineups ==
Period	Members	Releases
2013–2013	Jon Stevens – vocals, rhythm guitar; David Lowy – lead guitar; John Fields – bass, percussion (session only); Kevin Savigar – keyboards (session only); Dorian Crozier – drums (session only); Isaac Carpenter – drums (session 2 tracks only)	The Dead Daisies (2013)
March 2013	Jon Stevens – lead vocals, acoustic guitar; David Lowy – rhythm guitar; Richard Fortus – lead guitar, backing vocals; Jim Hilbun – bass, backing vocals; Charley Drayton – drums; Alan Mansfield – keyboards	none
April 2013	Jon Stevens – lead vocals, acoustic guitar; David Lowy – rhythm guitar; Charley Drayton – drums; Richard Fortus – lead guitar, backing vocals; Marco Mendoza – bass, backing vocals; Clayton Doley – keyboards, backing vocals	none
May 2013	Jon Stevens – lead vocals, acoustic guitar; David Lowy – rhythm guitar; Richard Fortus – lead guitar, backing vocals; Marco Mendoza – bass, backing vocals; Clayton Doley – keyboards, backing vocals; Alex Carapetis – drums	none
June–August 2013	Jon Stevens – lead vocals, acoustic guitar; David Lowy – rhythm guitar; Richard Fortus – lead guitar, backing vocals; Marco Mendoza – bass, backing vocals; Alex Carapetis – drums; Dizzy Reed – keyboards, backing vocals	none
August–September 2013	Jon Stevens – lead vocals, acoustic guitar; David Lowy – rhythm guitar; Richard Fortus – lead guitar, backing vocals; Marco Mendoza – bass, backing vocals; Dizzy Reed – keyboards, backing vocals; Frank Ferrer – drums	none
September 2013	Jon Stevens – lead vocals, acoustic guitar; David Lowy – rhythm guitar; Richard Fortus – lead guitar, backing vocals; Marco Mendoza – bass, backing vocals; Dizzy Reed – keyboards, backing vocals; Brian Tichy – drums	none
September–October 2013	Jon Stevens – lead vocals, acoustic guitar; David Lowy – rhythm guitar; Richard Fortus – lead guitar, backing vocals; Dizzy Reed – keyboards, backing vocals; Brian Tichy – drums; Darryl Jones – bass, backing vocals	none
October 2013–January 2014	Jon Stevens – lead vocals, acoustic guitar; David Lowy – rhythm guitar; Richard Fortus – lead guitar, backing vocals; Dizzy Reed – keyboards, backing vocals; Darryl Jones – bass, backing vocals; Charley Drayton – drums	none
January 2014	Jon Stevens – lead vocals, acoustic guitar; David Lowy – rhythm guitar; Richard Fortus – lead guitar, backing vocals; Dizzy Reed – keyboards, backing vocals; Charley Drayton – drums; Marco Mendoza – bass, backing vocals	none
February–May 2014	Jon Stevens – lead vocals, acoustic guitar; David Lowy – rhythm guitar; Richard Fortus – lead guitar, backing vocals; Dizzy Reed – keyboards, backing vocals; Marco Mendoza – bass, backing vocals; John Tempesta – drums	none
May 2014–February 2015	Jon Stevens – lead vocals, acoustic guitar; David Lowy – rhythm guitar; Richard Fortus – lead guitar, backing vocals; Dizzy Reed – keyboards, backing vocals; Marco Mendoza – bass, backing vocals; Brian Tichy – drums	Face I Love EP (2014); Locked and Loaded (2019) – live tracks
February 2015	David Lowy – rhythm guitar; Richard Fortus – lead guitar, backing vocals; Dizzy Reed – keyboards, backing vocals; Marco Mendoza – bass, backing vocals; Brian Tichy - drums; John Corabi – lead vocals (touring only); Bernard Fowler – lead vocals (touring only); Darryl Jones – bass, backing vocals (touring only)	none
February–March 2015	David Lowy – rhythm guitar; Richard Fortus – lead guitar, backing vocals; Dizzy Reed – keyboards, backing vocals; Marco Mendoza – bass, backing vocals; Brian Tichy – drums; John Corabi – lead vocals, acoustic guitar	Revolución (2015) – two tracks only
March–April 2015	David Lowy – rhythm guitar; Richard Fortus – lead guitar, backing vocals; Dizzy Reed – keyboards, backing vocals; Marco Mendoza – bass, backing vocals; John Corabi – lead vocals, acoustic guitar; Jackie Barnes – drums (session only)	Revolución (2015)
April–October 2015	David Lowy – rhythm guitar; Richard Fortus – lead guitar, backing vocals; Dizzy Reed – keyboards, backing vocals; Marco Mendoza – bass, backing vocals; John Corabi – lead vocals, acoustic guitar; Tommy Clufetos – drums (touring only); Damon Johnson – rhythm guitar (July–August 2015); Dave Leslie – lead guitar (October 2015)	none
October 2015–January 2016	David Lowy – rhythm guitar; Richard Fortus – lead guitar, backing vocals; Dizzy Reed – keyboards, backing vocals; Marco Mendoza – bass, backing vocals; John Corabi – lead vocals, acoustic guitar; Brian Tichy – drums	none
January 2016–November 2017	David Lowy – rhythm guitar; Marco Mendoza – bass, backing vocals; John Corabi – lead vocals, acoustic guitar; Brian Tichy – drums; Doug Aldrich – lead guitar, backing vocals; Yogi Lonich – rhythm guitar (Dec. 2016, Jun.–Jul. 2017)	Make Some Noise (2016); Live & Louder (2017); The Covers EP (2017)
November 2017–August 2019	David Lowy – rhythm guitar; Marco Mendoza – bass, backing vocals; John Corabi – lead vocals, acoustic guitar; Doug Aldrich – lead guitar, backing vocals; Deen Castronovo – drums, backing vocals	Burn It Down (2018); Locked and Loaded (2019)
August 2019–January 2021	David Lowy – rhythm guitar; Doug Aldrich – lead guitar, backing vocals; Deen Castronovo – drums, backing vocals; Glenn Hughes – lead vocals, bass	The Lockdown Sessions (2020); Holy Ground (2021)
January 2021–January 2022	David Lowy – rhythm guitar; Doug Aldrich – lead guitar, backing vocals; Glenn Hughes – lead vocals, bass; Tommy Clufetos – drums	none
January 2022–May 2023	David Lowy – rhythm guitar; Doug Aldrich – lead guitar, backing vocals; Glenn Hughes – lead vocals, bass; Brian Tichy – drums; Dino Jelusick – lead vocals (July–August 2022); Yogi Lonich – bass (July–August 2022)	Radiance (2022); Live from Daisyland (2022)
May 2023–June 2024	David Lowy – rhythm guitar; Doug Aldrich – lead guitar, backing vocals; Brian Tichy – drums; John Corabi – lead vocals, acoustic guitar; Michael Devin – bass, backing vocals	none
June 2024–July 2026	David Lowy – rhythm guitar; Doug Aldrich – lead guitar, backing vocals; John Corabi – lead vocals, acoustic guitar; Michael Devin – bass, backing vocals; Tommy Clufetos – drums; Reb Beach — lead guitar (November 2024); Brent Fitz — drums (June 2025)	Light 'Em Up (2024); Lookin' for Trouble (2025); Live Plus Five (2026)
October 2026–present	David Lowy – rhythm guitar; Doug Aldrich – lead guitar, backing vocals; Kelly Hansen – lead vocals; Jimi Crutchley – bass; Tommy Clufetos – drums	"Lift Me Up" (2026)
