= The Dead Daisies discography =

- The Dead Daisies, 2026
- Studio albums: 7
- EPs: 5
- Live albums: 2
- Compilation albums: 1
- Singles: 50
- Music videos: 30
- Cover albums: 2

The discography of The Dead Daisies, an Australian-American rock supergroup, consists of seven studio albums, two live albums, two cover albums, one compilation album, five extended plays (EPs), fifty singles and thirty music videos.

Formed in 2013, the Dead Daisies released their self-titled debut album on Spitfire Music that August, which reached number 42 on the Australian ARIA Albums Chart. This was followed by Revolución in 2015 and Make Some Noise in 2016, the latter of which reached the top 40 in Austria, Germany, Scotland, Switzerland, and the UK. The group released their first live album Live & Louder in 2017, which reached the top ten of the UK Rock & Metal Albums Chart.

In 2018, the Dead Daisies released their fourth album Burn It Down, which charted in the US on the Billboard Independent Albums chart at number 19. "Rise Up", the second single from the album, charted at number 35 on the Billboard Active Rock chart. Locked and Loaded: The Covers Album followed in 2019, reaching number 4 on the UK Rock & Metal Albums Chart and number 9 on the UK Independent Albums Chart, as well as charting in several European territories.

2021 saw the release of Holy Ground, which reached the top ten of the Billboard Independent Albums chart. The singles "Bustle and Flow" and "Holy Ground (Shake the Memory)" both reached the top 20 of the Billboard Mainstream Rock Indicator chart. Radiance followed in 2022, charting in several European territories and reaching the top 40 in Germany, Scotland, and Switzerland. The band released their first compilation Best Of in 2023, which reached number 4 on the UK Rock & Metal Albums Chart and number 18 on the UK Independent Albums Chart. 2024's Light 'Em Up charted in Austria, Germany, and Switzerland.

== Albums ==
=== Studio albums ===
List of studio albums, with selected chart positions
Title	Album details	Peak chart positions									
Title	Album details	AUS	AUT	BEL Fla.	BEL Wal.	ESP	GER	NED	SWI	UK	US Indie
The Dead Daisies	Released: 9 August 2013; Label: Spitfire; Formats: CD, DL	42	—	—	—	—	—	—	—	—	—
Revolución	Released: 31 August 2015; Label: Spitfire; Formats: CD, LP, DL	—	—	—	117	—	—	—	—	—	—
Make Some Noise	Released: 5 August 2016; Label: Spitfire, SPV; Formats: CD, 2LP, DL	—	34	166	159	—	22	159	10	35	—
Burn It Down	Released: 6 April 2018; Label: Spitfire, SPV; Formats: CD, LP, DL	—	15	150	105	100	10	199	15	28	19
Holy Ground	Released: 22 January 2021; Label: Spitfire, SPV, Steamhammer; Formats: CD, 2LP, DL	—	8	—	73	82	6	—	3	81	8
Radiance	Released: 30 September 2022; Label: Spitfire, SPV, Steamhammer; Formats: CD, 2LP, DL	—	51	—	134	—	28	—	12	—	—
Light 'Em Up	Released: 6 September 2024; Label: Spitfire, SPV, Steamhammer; Formats: CD, 2LP, DL	—	18	—	—	—	26	—	13	—	—
"—" denotes a release that did not chart or was not issued in that region.

=== Cover albums ===
List of studio albums, with selected chart positions
Title	Album details	Peak chart positions					
Title	Album details	BEL Wal.	GER	SCO	SWI	UK Indie	UK Rock
Locked and Loaded: The Covers Album	Released: 23 August 2019; Label: Spitfire, SPV; Formats: CD, LP, DL	110	72	25	81	9	4
Lookin' for Trouble	Released: 30 May 2025; Label: Spitfire, SPV, Steamhammer; Formats: CD, LP, DL	—	—	—	—	—	7
"—" denotes a release that did not chart or was not issued in that region.

=== Live albums ===
List of live albums, with selected chart positions
Title	Album details	Peak chart positions							
Title	Album details	AUT	BEL Fla.	BEL Wal.	GER	NED	SCO	SWI	UK Rock
Live & Louder	Released: 19 May 2017; Label: Spitfire, SPV; Formats: CD, CD+DVD, 2LP, DL	62	141	79	33	162	32	29	10
Live Plus Five	Released: 1 May 2026; Label: Spitfire, SPV; Formats: CD, LP, DL	69	—	—	—	—	66	—	11

=== Compilations ===
List of compilation albums, with selected chart positions
Title	Album details	Peak chart positions						
Title	Album details	GER	SCO	SWI	UK Indie	UK Phys.	UK Rock	UK Sales
Best Of	Released: 18 August 2023; Label: Spitfire/SPV; Formats: 2CD, 2LP, DL	66	42	87	18	53	4	55

== Extended plays ==
List of extended plays
Title	Album details
Face I Love	Released: 9 May 2014; Label: Spitfire; Formats: CD, DL
The Covers EP: Live at Planet Rock	Released: 2017; Label: Spitfire, SPV; Formats: 12" vinyl, DL
The Lockdown Sessions	Released: 17 July 2020; Label: Spinefarm; Format: DL
Live from Daisyland	Released: 4 May 2022; Label: Spitfire, SPV, Steamhammer; Format: DL
US Fall Tour EP - 2022	Released: 7 september 2022; Label: Spitfire; Formats: CD, DL

== Singles ==
List of singles, with selected chart positions, showing year released and album name
Title	Year	Peaks		Album
Title	Year	US Act. Rock	US Main. Rock	Album
"Lock 'n' Load" (featuring Slash)	2013	—	—	The Dead Daisies
"Washington"	2013	—	—	The Dead Daisies
"It's Gonna Take Time"	2014	—	—	The Dead Daisies
"Angel in Your Eyes"	2014	—	—	Face I Love
"Mexico"	2015	—	—	Revolución
"Long Way to Go"	2016	—	—	Make Some Noise
"Make Some Noise"	2016	—	—	Make Some Noise
"Song and a Prayer"	2016	—	—	Make Some Noise
"With You and I" (live)	2017	—	—	Live & Louder
"Resurrected"	2018	—	—	Burn It Down
"Rise Up"	2018	35	36	Burn It Down
"Dead and Gone"	2018	41	—	Burn It Down
"Can't Take It with You"	2018	—	—	Burn It Down
"Burn It Down"	2018	—	—	Burn It Down
"Dead and Gone" (swamp version)	2019	—	—	non-album single
"My Generation" (live)	2019	—	—	The Covers EP: Live at Planet Rock
"Judgement Day"	2019	—	—	Burn It Down
"Ramble On" (live)	2019	—	—	The Covers EP: Live at Planet Rock
"Maggie May" (live)	2019	—	—	The Covers EP: Live at Planet Rock
"We're an American Band" (live)	2019	—	—	The Covers EP: Live at Planet Rock
"Song and a Prayer" (live from Frankfurt)	2019	—	—	non-album singles
"Fortunate Son" (live from Frankfurt)	2019	—	—	non-album singles
"Helter Skelter" (live from Frankfurt)	2019	—	—	non-album singles
"Make It Louder" (EDM remix)	2019	—	—	non-album singles
"Fortunate Son"	2019	—	—	Make Some Noise
"Righteous Days"	2019	—	—	Holy Ground
"Mexico" (EDM remix)	2019	—	—	non-album single
"Unspoken"	2020	—	—	Holy Ground
"Bustle and Flow"	2020	—	—	Holy Ground
"Holy Ground (Shake the Memory)"	2020	—	—	Holy Ground
"Chosen and Justified"	2021	—	—	Holy Ground
"Like No Other 2021"	2021	—	—	Holy Ground
"My Fate"	2021	—	—	Holy Ground
"Saving Grace"	2021	—	—	Holy Ground
"Rise Up" (live)	2022	—	—	Live from Daisyland
"Bustle and Flow" (live)	2022	—	—	Live from Daisyland
"Long Way to Go" (live)	2022	—	—	Live from Daisyland
"Burn" (live)	2022	—	—	Live from Daisyland
"Radiance"	2022	—	—	Radiance
"Shine On"	2022	—	—	Radiance
"Hypnotize Yourself"	2022	—	—	Radiance
"Face Your Fear"	2022	—	—	Radiance
"Born to Fly"	2022	—	—	Radiance
"Light 'Em Up"	2024	—	—	Radiance
"I'm Gonna Ride"	2024	—	—	Light 'Em Up
"I Wanna Be Your Bitch"	2024	—	—	Light 'Em Up
"Born to Fly" (twocolors remix)	2025	—	—	non-album single
"Love That'll Never Be"	2025	—	—	Light 'Em Up
"Crossroads"	2025	—	—	Lookin' for Trouble
"Boom Boom"	2025	—	—	Lookin' for Trouble
"Lift Me Up"	2026	—	—	non-album single
"—" denotes a release that did not chart or was not issued in that region.

== Music videos ==
List of music videos, showing year released and director(s) name
Title	Year	Director(s)	Ref.
"Lock 'n' Load" (featuring Slash)	2013	Summer DeRoche	
"Washington"	2013	Phil Poole	
"Face I Love"	2014	Gil Elkrief	
"Angel in Your Eyes"	2015	Katarina Benzova	
"Midnight Moses"	2015	Alejandro Demetrius	
"Mexico"	2015	Paul Boyd	
"With You and I"	2015	Danny Saber, Jonathan Covert	
"Long Way to Go"	2016	Lukas Hambach	
"Join Together"	2016	Jerzy Owsiak, Lukas Hambach	
"Song and a Prayer"	2016	Damian Lang	
"Make Some Noise" (live)	2017	Anthony Cortez Fernandez	
"We're an American Band" (live)	2017	Lukas Hambach	
"She Always Gets Her Way (All the Same)"	2017	Josh Goodswen	
"Rise Up"	2018	Luiz Tosi	
"Dead and Gone"	2018	Tony E. Valenzuela	
"Dead and Gone" (swamp version)	2019	Oliver Halfin	
"Mexico" (EDM remix with twocolors)	2020	twocolors	
"30 Days in the Hole"	2020	Oliver Halfin	
"Holy Ground (Shake the Memory)"	2020	David Pear	
"Chosen and Justified"	2021	David Pear	
"Like No Other"	2021	Dream Works London	
"Radiance"	2022	Liviu Antoni	
"Shine On"	2022	David Pear	
"Face Your Fear"	2022	David Pear	
"Resurrected"	2023	David Pear	
"Light 'Em Up"	2024	David Pear	
"I'm Gonna Ride"	2024	David Pear	
"Love That'll Never Be"	2025	David Pear	
"Crossroads"	2025	David Pear	
"Boom Boom"	2025	David Pear	
"Lift Me Up"	2026	David Pear	
