= Live & Louder =

Live album by The Dead Daisies
- Released: 19 May 2017
- Recorded: 2016
- Venue: Various concerts throughout the Make Some Noise Tour
- Genre: Hard rock
- Length: 77:27
- Label: Spitfire
- Producer: Doug Aldrich

The Dead Daisies chronology
Make Some Noise (2016)	Live & Louder (2017)	Burn It Down (2018)

Singles from Live & Louder
- 1. "With You And I (live)" Released: 2017

Live & Louder is the first live album by the Australian–American hard rock band the Dead Daisies. It was released on 19 May 2017, by Spitfire Music.

The Digipak version contains a massive photo booklet and a DVD, featuring behind the scene and tour documentaries.

Professional ratings
Review scores
Source	Rating
Blabbermouth.net	8/10
BraveWords	10/10
Classic Rock	8/10
Classic Rock Revisited	B
KNAC.com	5/5
Metaltalk.net	10/10

== Track listing ==
Songwriting credits via disc booklet.

No.	Title	Writer(s)	Length
1.	"Long Way to Go"	Doug Aldrich, John Corabi, Marti Frederiksen, David Lowy, Marco Mendoza & Brian Tichy	4:44
2.	"Mexico"	Jon Stevens, Lowy, Mendoza, Richard Fortus, Dizzy Reed	5:16
3.	"Make Some Noise"	Aldrich, Corabi, Frederiksen, Lowy, Mendoza, Tichy	2:59
4.	"Song and a Prayer"	Aldrich, Corabi, Frederiksen, Lowy, Mendoza, Tichy	3:38
5.	"Fortunate Son" (Creedence Clearwater Revival cover)	John Fogerty	4:01
6.	"We All Fall Down"	Aldrich, Corabi, Frederiksen, Lowy, Mendoza, Tichy	3:43
7.	"Lock'N'Load"	Slash, Stevens	5:11
8.	"Something I Said"	Stevens, Lowy, Mendoza, Fortus, Reed	5:18
9.	"Last Time I Saw The Sun"	Aldrich, Corabi, Frederiksen, Lowy, Mendoza, Tichy	5:13
10.	"Join Together" (The Who cover)	Pete Townshend	6:30
11.	"With You And I"	Corabi, Lowy, Mendoza, Fortus, Reed	5:05
12.	"Band Intros"	Aldrich, Corabi, Lowy, Mendoza, Tichy	5:04
13.	"Mainline"	Aldrich, Corabi, Frederiksen, Lowy, Mendoza, Tichy	4:53
14.	"Helter Skelter" (The Beatles cover)	John Lennon, Paul McCartney	6:56
15.	"American Band" (Grand Funk Railroad cover)	Don Brewer	3:26
16.	"Midnight Moses" (Sensational Alex Harvey Band cover)	Alex Harvey	5:30
Total length:			1:17:27

=== DVD special features ===
- Behind the Scenes of "Live & Louder" documentary

== Personnel ==
Credits are adapted from disc booklet.

- Doug Aldrich – guitar
- John Corabi – vocals, acoustic guitar
- David Lowy – guitar
- Marco Mendoza - bass, backing vocals
- Brian Tichy – drums

Production

- Doug Aldrich – production
- Anthony Focx – mixing
- Tommy Dimitfoff – recording
- Howie Weinberg – mastering
- Gentry Studer – assistant mastering
- Sebastien Rohde – album artwork, cover design
- Oliver Halfin – photography, additional filming
- David Edwards – management

== Chart performance ==
Chart (2017)	Peak position
Austrian Albums Chart	62
Belgian Albums Chart (Flanders)	141
Belgian Albums Chart (Wallonia)	79
German Albums Chart	33
Swiss Albums Chart	29
