= Katarina Benzova =

Slovenka-born photographer

Katarina Benzova (born 1987) is a Slovak photographer known for her work with Guns N' Roses and other rock bands.

== Career ==
Benzova was born in Liptovsky Mikulas, Slovakia, in 1987. Her professional photography career began in 2010 when she was given the opportunity to go on tour with Guns N' Roses. She has also worked with bands like KISS, The Rolling Stones, Aerosmith, Def Leppard, Mötley Crüe, Bad Company, Lynyrd Skynyrd, Courtney Love, Thin Lizzy, Motörhead, Van Halen, ZZ Top, Marilyn Manson, KORN, Jane's Addiction, Alice In Chains, The Kills, The Cult, Billy Idol and many more.

With her working relationship with Guns N' Roses, it has led her to assignments with AC/DC while Axl Rose handled vocal duties for part of the 'Rock Or Bust' Tour in 2016 and The Dead Daisies while Guns N' Roses members Richard Fortus and Dizzy Reed were part of their line-up.

Benzova's photographs have appeared in publications throughout in both print and online, including Vogue Italia, Rolling Stone Magazine, New York Times, LA Times, Forbes, SPIN Magazine, NME Magazine, Classic Rock Magazine, USA Today, Billboard Magazine, Revolver Magazine, Fox News, NY Daily News, CBS and Ultimate Classic Rock.

She has photographed commercial pictures for Monster Energy, Celestion Speakers, James Trussart Guitars, Asba Swag, Roto Sound and Animals Asia print campaign.

Benzova has presented her work in numerous exhibitions including KISS Exhibition at Hard Rock Hotel in Las Vegas in 2014 and multiple photography exhibitions during Cannes Film Festival. Her photography is often used in tour programs including Guns N' Roses Chinese Democracy, Appetite For Democracy, Not In This Lifetime tour programs as well as KISS programs.

A trip to Cuba in 2015 with The Dead Daisies as one of the first American bands to play there, Benzova published a book and directed a short documentary called Revolucion, based on The Dead Daisies 2015 album.

Her photography has also been used for album artwork including Sebastian Bach/Apachalypes Now, The Dead Daisies Face I Love and Revolucion.

== Personal projects ==
Benzova has used her photography skills to raise money for different charities. She has also done silent auctions of her work for organizations like NAMI, Toys For Tots and Fathers Heart Foundation. She has also donated her time as a photographer for projects like Nelson Mandela: Legacy Of Hope Foundation and The Heroes Project.

In 2015 she co-produced and shot a campaign for Animals Asia that included artists like Anthony Kiedis from Red Hot Chili Peppers, Ozzy and Sharon Osbourne, Simon Le Bon from Duran Duran, Duff McKagan & DJ Ashba from Guns N' Roses, Moby, Matt Lucas and Steve-O.

In 2017 Benzova started her foundation called MISSION 11 where she creates free campaigns for various charity organisations. Other than the Animals Asia campaign she did in past she also created campaign for Wolf Conservation Centre in 2016 which was called #StandForWolves working with Axl Rose, Jason Momoa and Lisa Bonet. In 2017 she also became a member of the Board of Advisers for the Wildlife Conservation Film Festival.
