= Make Some Noise (The Dead Daisies album) =

Studio album by The Dead Daisies
- Released: August 5, 2016
- Recorded: 2016
- Studio: Sienna Recordings Studios
- Genre: Hard rock
- Length: 44:50
- Label: Spitfire
- Producer: Marti Frederiksen

The Dead Daisies chronology
Revolución (2015)	Make Some Noise (2016)	Live & Louder (2017)

Singles from Make Some Noise
- 1. "Long Way to Go" Released: June 17, 2016; 2. "Make Some Noise" Released: July 28, 2016; 3. "Join Together" Released: August 2, 2016; 4. "Song and a Prayer" Released: October 4, 2016

Make Some Noise is the third studio album by the Australian–American hard rock band the Dead Daisies. It was released on August 9, 2016, by Spitfire Music.

== Track listing ==
Songwriting credits via disc booklet: all tracks written by Doug Aldrich, John Corabi, Marti Frederiksen, David Lowy, Marco Mendoza and Brian Tichy unless otherwise noted.

No.	Title	Music	Length
1.	"Long Way to Go"		4:20
2.	"We All Fall Down"		3:19
3.	"Song and a Prayer"		3:30
4.	"Mainline"		3:51
5.	"Make Some Noise"		2:51
6.	"Fortunate Son (Creedence Clearwater Revival cover)"	John Fogerty	3:23
7.	"Last Time I Saw The Sun"		4:13
8.	"Mine All Mine"		3:33
9.	"How Does It Feel"		3:09
10.	"Freedom"		3:47
11.	"All the Same"		4:31
12.	"Join Together (The Who cover)"	Pete Townshend	4:13
Total length:			44:50

Professional ratings
Review scores
Source	Rating
Blabbermouth.net	8/10
Classic Rock	7/10
Classic Rock Revisited	B+
KNAC.com	4.5/5
The National	4/5

== Personnel ==
Credits are adapted from disc booklet.

- Doug Aldrich – guitar
- John Corabi – vocals, acoustic guitar
- David Lowy – guitar
- Marco Mendoza – bass, backing vocals
- Brian Tichy – drums

Additional personnel

- Marti Frederiksen – backing vocals, production
- Suzie McNeil – harmonica, backing vocals

Production

- Anthony Focx – mixing
- Ross Hogarth – engineering
- Kyle Richards, Dave Latto – assistant engineering
- Kari Smith – production coordinator
- Howie Weinberg – mastering
- Gentry Studer – assistant mastering
- Freimauer.com – art direction, graphic design
- Oliver Halfin, Katarina Benzova – photography
- David Edwards – management

== Chart performance ==
Chart (2016)	Peak position
Austrian Albums Chart	34
Belgian Albums Chart (Flanders)	166
Belgian Albums Chart (Wallonia)	159
French Albums Chart	160
German Albums Chart	22
Scottish Albums (OCC)	15
Swiss Albums Chart	10
UK Albums Chart	35
UK Album Downloads (OCC)	45
UK Rock & Metal Albums (OCC)	3
UK Independent Albums (OCC)	20
US Independent Albums (Billboard)	21
US Top Hard Rock Albums (Billboard)	11
US Top Rock Albums (Billboard)	44
