= Live for Tomorrow =

Studio album by Marco Mendoza
- Released: July 6, 2007
- Genre: Hard rock
- Length: 49:31
- Label: Frontiers Records
- Producer: Richie Kotzen

Live for Tomorrow is the first solo album by American hard rock bassist Marco Mendoza. It was produced and co-written by Richie Kotzen, who also recorded most of the guitar tracks and made several vocal appearances. The album also features many other famous rock musicians, such as Steve Lukather of Toto, Doug Aldrich and Tommy Aldridge of Whitesnake, Ted Nugent, Brian Tichy and others.

== Track listing ==
1. "Not For Me"
2. "Live For Tomorrow"
3. "Lettin' Go"
4. "Look Out For The Boys"
5. "I Want You"
6. "Your Touch"
7. "Let The Sun Shine"
8. "You Got Me"
9. "In My Face"
10. "Broken"
11. "Still In Me"
12. "Dance With Me"

== Personnel ==
- Marco Mendoza: Bass, vocals
- Richie Kotzen: Producer, guitars, vocals
- Steve Lukather: Guitar
- Doug Aldrich: Guitar
- Ted Nugent: Guitar
- Tommy Aldridge: Drums
- Brian Tichy: Drums
- Steve Weingart: Keyboards
