= Mink (band) =

Former Australian-American band (2006–2009)

- Origin: New York City, New York, United States
- Genres: Pop rock; power pop
- Years active: 2006–2009
- Labels: Spitfire/Fontana; Grey Nurse
- Past members: Neal Carlson; Grant Fitzpatrick; David Lowy; Nick Maybury; Stella Mozgawa
- Website: minkmusic.com

Mink (styled as MINK) was an Australian–American pop rock band formed in early 2006. They were led by American-born Neal Carlson on lead vocals with four Australian musicians Grant Fitzpatrick on bass guitar, David Lowy on rhythm guitar, Nick Maybury on lead guitar and Stella Mozgawa on drums. They issued their self-titled debut album in August 2007. They toured both Australia and America. In 2008 Lowy had left and the group disbanded in 2009.

== History ==
Mink were formed in early 2006 in New York City by American-born Neal Carlson on lead vocals with four Australian musicians, Grant Fitzpatrick on bass guitar (ex-Sarah McLeod), David Lowy on rhythm guitar, Nick Maybury on lead guitar and Stella Mozgawa on drums. Carlson was born in Queens, New York, he released two solo albums and had been a member of rock group, Bona Roba. In 2005 Carlson was a top 15 finalist on TV talent quest, Rock Star: INXS. Fitzpatrick was born in Brisbane and had worked at Sony Music Australia, Sydney in early 2000s. He provided bass guitar in Sarah McLeod's backing band, the Black Diamond Express, from May 2005. Sydney native Lowy is the son of business-entrepreneur Frank Lowy and is the family's financial director. Maybury and Mozgawa had played together in various Sydney bands since 2000.

According to AllMusic's Steve Leggett Mink were a "lean, tuneful power pop" group. They toured Australia in November–December 2006. In mid-2007 the group toured the United States, supporting Saliva for ten dates and Kiss for two gigs. In August 2007 Mink issued their debut self-titled album, which was produced by Sylvia Massy, via Spitfire Music/Fontana and Grey Nurse Music. BBC's Jennifer Nelson felt it provided, "safe, formulaic pop rock... [and] sunny surf-rock, tinged with MTV-lite guitar sounds." "Talk to Me" was issued as its lead single a month ahead of Mink, which Nelson felt, "is so similar to Jet's 'Are You Gonna Be My Girl' that when you listen to one you can't hum the tune of the other."

Album track, "New York Summer", was co-written by Carlson, Fitzpatrick and Mozgawa. Another Mink track, "Pressure, Pressure", was used during ESPN's broadcast of the 2006 major league baseball playoffs. Alice Cooper played album track, "Get It Right", on his radio program, Throwback Thursdays and stated, "[they] have a pop punk sort of sound with a great but appropriate snotty vibe." Late in 2007 they issued another single, "Dematerialize" and were signed with Japanese label, Avex Entertainment, to release their debut album in that market and toured Japan in April 2008. In the following month, after Lowy had left, the remaining four-piece released a music video for "Get It Right", which was directed by Fitzpatrick.

== Afterwards ==
Fitzpatrick played with Matt Sorum in 2012 and Cherie Currie in 2013. In 2015 he joined American-based English rock group, the Cult, which toured Australia in the following year. Lowy continued his business career but also established a musical collective, the Dead Daisies in 2013. Maybury went on to work with Perry Farrell, Jimmy Barnes, Matt Sorum, Cherie Currie, Michelle Branch, The Madden Brothers, Scott Weiland & The Wildabouts, Cody Simpson, Dorothy, Taylor Hawkins, NHC, Orianthi, Paulina Rubio, Porno For Pyros and also performed live with Prince at the Sayers Club 2015 in LA and The Foo Fighters lollapalooza Stockholm 2019 . Mozgawa became the drummer for American indie rock group, Warpaint in mid-2009. In 2020 Maybury and Mozgawa were joined by Jono Ma, Itsi, Jonti and Ewan Pearson on a tribute to Florian Schneider (1947–2020) for their cover version of "Neon Lights".

== Discography ==
=== Albums ===
- Mink (28 August 2007) Spitfire Music/Fontana, Grey Nurse Music

=== Singles ===
- "Talk to Me" (2007)
- "Dematerialize" (2007)
- "Get It Right" (2008)
