= Dizzy Reed =

American musician (born 1963)

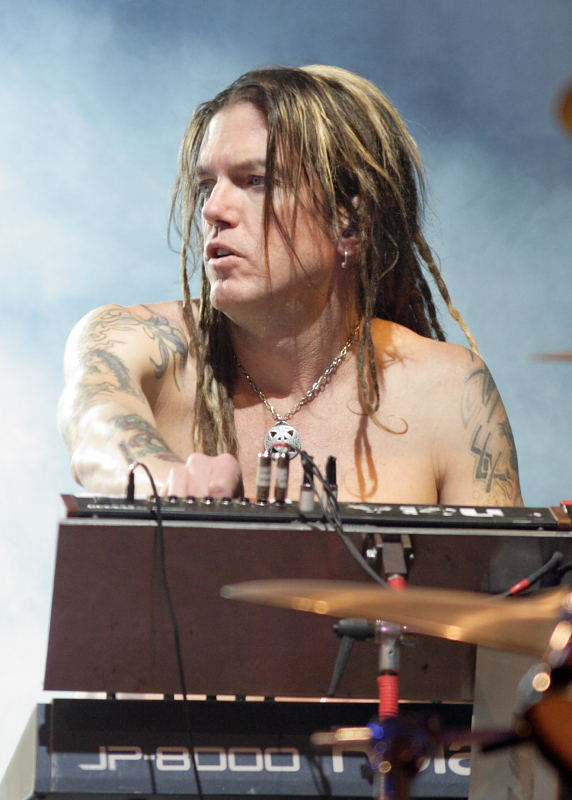
- Reed performing in 2006 with Guns N' Roses

Background information
- Also known as: Dizzy; Dizzy F'n Reed
- Born: Darren Arthur Reed; June 18, 1963 (age 63); Hinsdale, Illinois, U.S.
- Genres: Hard rock; heavy metal; alternative rock
- Occupation: Musician
- Instruments: Keyboards; vocals; guitar
- Years active: 1985–present
- Label: Geffen
- Member of: Guns N' Roses; Hookers & Blow
- Formerly of: Johnny Crash; The Dead Daisies
- Website: dizzyfnreed.com; gunsnroses.com
- Children: 4

Darren Arthur "Dizzy" Reed (born June 18, 1963) is an American musician. He is best known as the keyboardist for the hard rock band Guns N' Roses, with whom he has played, toured, and recorded since 1990.

Aside from lead singer Axl Rose, Reed is the longest-standing member of Guns N' Roses, and was the only member of the band to remain from their Use Your Illusion era until the 2016 return of guitarist Slash and bass guitarist Duff McKagan.

In 2012, Reed was inducted into the Rock and Roll Hall of Fame as a member of Guns N' Roses, although he did not attend the ceremony. He was also a member of the Australian-American supergroup The Dead Daisies with his Guns N' Roses bandmate Richard Fortus, ex-Whitesnake member Marco Mendoza, ex-Mötley Crüe frontman John Corabi and session drummer Brian Tichy.

== Early life ==
Reed was born as Darren Arthur Reed on June 18, 1963, in Hinsdale, Illinois, and was raised in Colorado. Reed was described as reclusive and introverted, however he has since denied this. His grandmother began teaching him to play the organ when he was a young child, and before he was out of elementary school, he formed small local bands.

== Music career ==
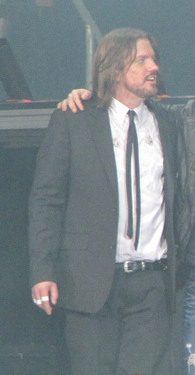
Reed after a Guns N' Roses concert in 2010.

As an adult, Reed pursued a music career in Los Angeles. He was a founding member of the club band The Wild in the 1980s, with whom he spent five years.

Reed met the classic lineup of Guns N' Roses in 1985 while the Wild rehearsed in a neighboring studio. He kept in touch, and in 1990 was invited by lead singer Axl Rose to join their recording of the two Use Your Illusion albums and their subsequent tour.

Reed soon became an accepted member of the group and appeared on every album from Use Your Illusion I onward. As a member of Guns N' Roses, Reed has become well known for his keyboard, piano, and backing vocal work on such songs as "Estranged", "Live and Let Die", "November Rain", "Garden of Eden", "Civil War", "Yesterdays", and "Knockin' On Heaven's Door". In addition to playing keyboards or piano, Reed frequently provides backup on percussion and vocals during live Guns N' Roses performances of older songs, such as "Mr. Brownstone", "Nightrain", "Welcome to the Jungle" and "Rocket Queen".

Reed continues to record and play live with the current Guns N' Roses line-up, and has now been a member of Guns N' Roses longer than any other member besides Rose. Although Reed did not co-write any songs during the Illusion sessions, for Chinese Democracy he co-wrote "Chinese Democracy", "Catcher in the Rye", "Street of Dreams", "There Was a Time", "I.R.S", and "Oh My God". It has also been confirmed that the unfinished demo that did not make the cut on Chinese Democracy, called "Silkworms", was written by Reed and the band's other keyboardist Chris Pitman. The song was re-worked and released as a single under the title "Absurd" in 2021.

=== Work outside Guns N' Roses ===
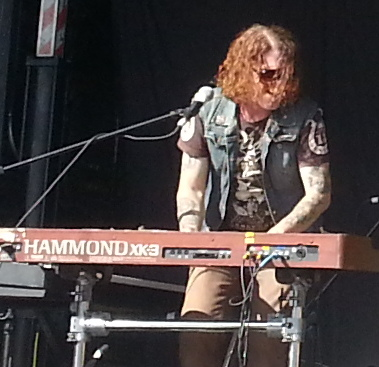
Reed playing with The Dead Daisies in 2013.

Outside of Guns N' Roses, Reed played on albums for his former bandmates Slash, Duff McKagan, and Gilby Clarke. He also guested on former Guns N' Roses bassist Tommy Stinson's 2004 solo effort Village Gorilla Head. Reed is additionally a fan of Larry Norman, a pioneer of Christian music, and played on Norman's Copper Wires album. He has composed music for the film scores The Still Life, released in 2006, and Celebrity Art Show (2008). His debut solo album was released on February 16, 2018.

When he is not touring or recording with Guns N' Roses, Reed frequently tours with his hard rock cover band Hookers & Blow, in which he plays keyboard and sings lead vocals. Hookers & Blow was formed in 2003 by Reed and Quiet Riot guitarist Alex Grossi. The Hookers & Blow lineup also consists of former Type O Negative and current Danzig and Quiet Riot drummer Johnny Kelly, W.A.S.P. bassist Mike Duda and Dizzy's wife Nadja. For his work with Hookers & Blow, Reed was named Outstanding Keyboardist of the Year at the 2007 Rock City Awards ("Rockies"). Hookers & Blow was also named Best Cover Band.

Reed has also dabbled in acting, appearing as 'Mumbles' in the 2005 film Charlie's Death Wish.

Reed was a member of The Dead Daisies alongside Guns N' Roses guitarist Richard Fortus. Both left the band in 2015 to focus on Guns N' Roses.

Reed played keyboard on the 2019 album You're Welcome by Cokie The Clown, a solo effort by NOFX frontman Fat Mike.

== Personal life ==
Reed was married for 20 years to wife Lisa. They divorced in 2010. They have two daughters. He also has a daughter and a son from a previous relationship.

In 2005, Reed took the unusual step of seeking admission to a college fraternity well after the traditional age of inductees, and on January 22, 2006, was admitted to the Cornell University chapter of Zeta Psi.

== Discography ==
=== Solo ===
Albums

Title	Release date	Label
Rock 'N' Roll Chose Me	August 22, 2025	50q records
Rock 'n Roll Ain't Easy	2018	Golden Robot Records

Other appearances

Year	Song	Album	Notes
1996	"Chopin's Raindrop"	Steinway to Heaven	Frédéric Chopin cover

=== with Guns N' Roses ===
Studio albums

Title	Release date	Label
Use Your Illusion I	1991	Geffen
Use Your Illusion II	1991	Geffen
"The Spaghetti Incident?"	1993	Geffen
Chinese Democracy	2008	Geffen

Extended Plays

Title	Release date	Label
The "Civil War" EP	1993	Geffen
Hard Skool EP	2021	Geffen
London 1991	2023	Geffen

Live albums

Title	Release date	Label
Live Era '87–'93	1999	Geffen
Appetite for Democracy 3D	2014	Interscope/Universal

Compilation albums

Title	Release date	Label
Greatest Hits	2004	Geffen

Non-album singles

- "Absurd" (2021)
- "Hard Skool" (2021)
- "Perhaps" / "The General" (2023)

Contributions

Song	Title	Release date	Label
"Sympathy for the Devil"	Interview with the Vampire soundtrack	1994	Geffen
"Oh My God"	End of Days soundtrack	1999	Geffen

=== with Johnny Crash ===
Title	Release date	Label
Unfinished Business	2008	Suncity Records

=== with The Dead Daisies ===
Title	Release date	Label
The Dead Daisies	2013	Spitfire Records
Revolución	2015	Spitfire Records

=== with Hookers and Blow ===
Title	Release date	Label
Hookers and Blow	2021	Golden Robot Records

=== Guest appearances ===
Title	Artist	Release date	Label
Coneheads soundtrack	various artists	1993	Warner Bros.
Believe in Me	Duff McKagan	1993	Geffen Records
Pawnshop Guitars	Gilby Clarke	1994	Virgin
Wish Across The Land	The Merchants of Venus	1994	WEA
Live At 14 Below	Mick Taylor	1995	Shattered Music
Coastin' Home	Mick Taylor	1995	Shattered Music
It's Five O'Clock Somewhere	Slash's Snakepit	1995	Fontana Records
Playtime	Michael Zentner	1995	Warped Disc
Not What I Had Planned	Maissa	1996	Sonic
Copper Wires	Larry Norman	1996	Solid Rock Records
Steinway to Heaven	various artists	1997	Magna Carta
Electrovision	Doug Aldrich	2001	Pony Canyon
Rock N' Roll Music	Col. Parker	2001	V2 Records
Hammered	Motörhead	2002	Castle
Ready to Go	Bang Tango	2004	Shrapnel
Village Gorilla Head	Tommy Stinson	2004	EMI
Strangeland	Court Jester	2006	Cellar Records
Bare Bones	The Blessings	2006	Basement Boy Records
The Still Life	various artists	2007	Albion Entertainment
Gilby Clarke	Gilby Clarke	2007	Spitfire
Backyard Babies	Backyard Babies	2008	Universal
Spirit of Christmas	Northern Light Orchestra	2009	VSR Music Group
One Man Mutiny	Tommy Stinson	2011	Done To Death Music
III	Atomirotta	2018	Monsp Records
Atomic Highway	DC4	2018	Highvolmusic Records
IV	Atomirotta	2020	Atomi Records
Punching the Sky	Armored Saint	2020	Metal Blade Records
Truth in Unity	Chris Catena's Rock City Tribe	2020	Grooveyard Records
When Life Was Hard And Fast	Ricky Warwick	2021	Nuclear Blast Records
