= Revolución (The Dead Daisies album) =

Studio album by The Dead Daisies
- Released: August 31, 2015
- Recorded: 2015
- Studio: Abdala (Havana, Cuba), Studios 301 (Sydney, Australia)
- Genre: Hard rock
- Length: 65:00
- Label: Spitfire Music
- Producer: Ben Grosse, Craig Porteils, The Dead Daisies

The Dead Daisies chronology
The Dead Daisies (2013)	Revolución (2015)	Make Some Noise (2016)

Singles from Revolución
- 1. "Mexico" Released: June 23, 2015; 2. "With You and I" Released: October 3, 2015; 3. "Something I Said" Released: October 7, 2015; 4. "Devil Out of Time" Released: February 6, 2016

Revolución is the second studio album by Australian–American hard rock band the Dead Daisies. It was released on August 31, 2015, by Spitfire Music and peaked at No. 52 on the ARIA Albums Chart.

== Track listing ==
Credits are adapted from disc booklet.

No.	Title	Writer(s)	Length
1.	"Mexico"	Richard Fortus, David Lowy, Marco Mendoza, Dizzy Reed, Jon Stevens	4:40
2.	"Evil" (Howlin' Wolf cover)	Willie Dixon	3:14
3.	"Looking for the One"	John Corabi, Fortus, Lowy, Mendoza, Reed	4:01
4.	"Empty Heart"	Jimmy Barnes, Tommy Boyce	3:45
5.	"Make the Best of It"	Fortus, Lowy, Mendoza, Reed, Stevens	4:06
6.	"Something I Said"	Fortus, Lowy, Mendoza, Reed, Stevens	5:17
7.	"Get Up, Get Ready"	Corabi, Fortus, Lowy, Mendoza, Reed	5:17
8.	"With You and I"	Corabi, Fortus, Lowy, Mendoza, Reed	4:37
9.	"Sleep"	Corabi, Matthew Lee Farley	4:40
10.	"My Time"	Corabi, Fortus, Lowy, Mendoza, Reed	4:57
11.	"Midnight Moses" (Sensational Alex Harvey Band cover)	Alex Harvey	4:30
12.	"Devil Out of Time"	Corabi, Fortus, Lowy, Mendoza, Reed	3:17
13.	"Critical"	Fortus, Lowy, Mendoza, Reed, Stevens	4:16
Total length:			65:00

== Personnel ==
The Dead Daisies

- Jackie Barnes – drums, percussion, backing vocals
- John Corabi – vocals, acoustic guitar
- Richard Fortus – guitar
- David Lowy – guitar
- Marco Mendoza – bass, backing vocals
- Dizzy Reed – keyboards, backing vocals

Additional personnel

- Jimmy Barnes – vocals on "Empty Heart"
- Yaimi Karell Lay – percussion on "Evil" and "Midnight Moses"
- Brian Tichy – drums on "Evil" and "Midnight Moses"

Production

- Ben Grosse – producer, engineer, mixing
- Craig Porteils – producer, engineer
- Owen Butcher, Dayana Rodríguez Hernández, Amhed Ali González Pérez – assistant engineers
- Paul Pavao – mixing assistant
- Tom Baker – mastering
