= Burn It Down (album) =

Studio album by The Dead Daisies
- Released: April 6, 2018 (International release); March 21, 2019 (Japanese release)
- Recorded: 2017
- Studio: Sienna Recordings, Nashville, Tennessee, US
- Genre: Hard rock
- Length: 41:51 (standard edition); 45:47 (Digipak edition)
- Label: Spitfire and SPV (International release); Ward Records (Japanese release)
- Producer: Marti Frederiksen

The Dead Daisies chronology
Live & Louder (2017)	Burn It Down (2018)	Locked and Loaded (2019)

Singles from Burn It Down
- 1. "Rise Up" Released: March 9, 2018; 2. "Dead and Gone" Released: June 22, 2018

Professional ratings
Review scores
Source	Rating
Blabbermouth.net	8/10
Classic Rock	7/10
Classic Rock Revisited	B+
KNAC	5/5
Metaltalk.net	10/10

Burn It Down is the fourth studio album from Australian-American hard rock band the Dead Daisies, released on April 6, 2018, by Spitfire Music.

== Track listing ==
Songwriting credits from liner notes. All tracks written by Doug Aldrich, John Corabi, Marti Frederiksen, David Lowy and Marco Mendoza unless otherwise noted.

No.	Title	Music	Length
1.	"Resurrected"		4:35
2.	"Rise Up"		4:30
3.	"Burn It Down"		5:48
4.	"Judgement Day"		4:13
5.	"What Goes Around"		4:02
6.	"Bitch" (the Rolling Stones cover)	Mick Jagger, Keith Richards	3:55
7.	"Set Me Free"		4:21
8.	"Dead And Gone"		3:27
9.	"Can't Take It with You"		3:07
10.	"Leave Me Alone"		3:53
Total length:			41:51

Digipak edition bonus track
No.	Title	Music	Length
11.	"Revolution" (the Beatles cover)	John Lennon, Paul McCartney	3:56
Total length:			45:47

== Personnel ==
Credits are adapted from liner notes.

- Doug Aldrich – guitar
- John Corabi – vocals
- David Lowy – guitar
- Marco Mendoza – bass guitar, backing vocals
- Deen Castronovo – drums, backing vocals

Additional personnel

- Marti Frederiksen – keys, percussion, backing vocals, production, additional engineering

Production

- Anthony Focx – mixing
- Tim Brennan – engineering
- Brent Mitschke – engineering assistance
- Lee Hollister – band technician and coordination
- Kari Smith – production assistance
- Howie Weinberg – mastering
- Sebastien Rohde – front cover, artwork, graphic design
- David Edwards – management

== Charts ==
Chart (2018)	Peak position
Austrian Albums (Ö3 Austria)	15
Belgian Albums (Ultratop Flanders)	150
Belgian Albums (Ultratop Wallonia)	105
Dutch Albums (Album Top 100)	199
French Albums (SNEP)	165
German Albums (Offizielle Top 100)	10
Hungarian Albums (MAHASZ)	24
Scottish Albums (OCC)	27
Spanish Albums (Promusicae)	100
Swiss Albums (Schweizer Hitparade)	15
UK Albums (OCC)	28
US Heatseekers Albums (Billboard)	6
US Independent Albums (Billboard)	19
US Top Album Sales (Billboard)	100
