= Richard Fortus =

American guitarist (born 1966)

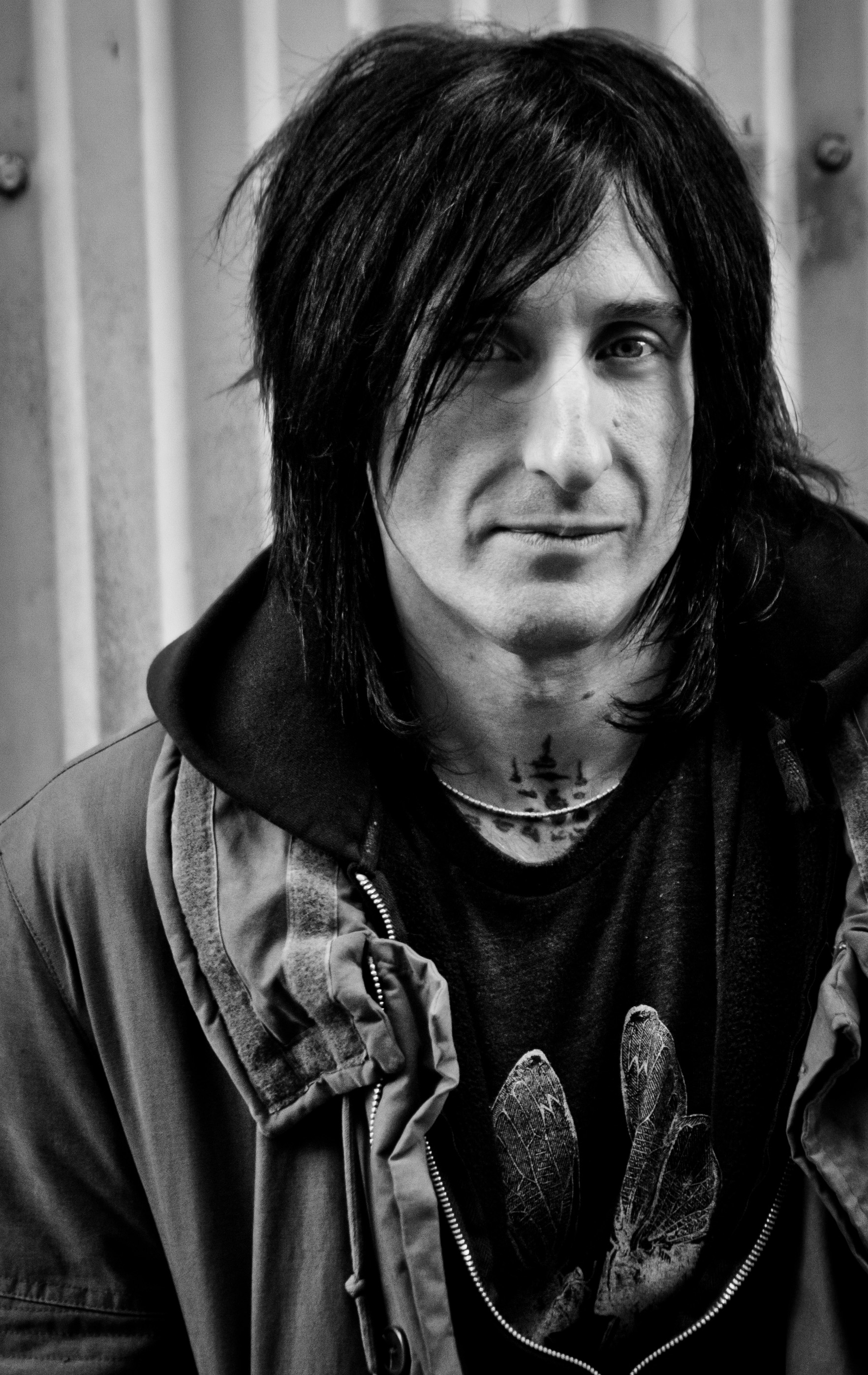
- Fortus in 2012

Background information
- Born: November 17, 1966 (age 59); St. Louis, Missouri, U.S.
- Genres: Rock; post-punk; heavy metal; new wave
- Occupations: Musician; songwriter; producer
- Instruments: Guitar; vocals
- Years active: 1984–present
- Labels: Atlantic; Geffen
- Member of: Guns N' Roses
- Formerly of: The Dead Daisies; Love Spit Love; The Psychedelic Furs; Thin Lizzy; The Eyes
- Spouse: Stephanie Howlett (m. 2016)
- Website: Official website
- Children: 2

Richard Fortus (born November 17, 1966) is an American guitarist. He has been a member of the hard rock band Guns N' Roses since 2002 and has recorded one studio album with them. Fortus has also collaborated extensively with The Psychedelic Furs frontman Richard Butler and former Guns N' Roses bandmate Frank Ferrer. Aside from lead singer Axl Rose and keyboardist Dizzy Reed, Fortus is the longest-tenured member of Guns N' Roses, having been with the band continuously since 2002.

Alongside his work in Guns N' Roses, Fortus is a former member of Love Spit Love, Thin Lizzy, and The Dead Daisies.

== Career ==
=== Early life and beginning career ===
Fortus was born in St. Louis, Missouri. He began learning violin at 4 years old and the drums a year later.

Fortus studied at the Conservatory of the Arts in St. Louis and Southern Illinois University and also played in several youth symphonies in the St. Louis area.

=== The Eyes/Pale Divine (1984–91) ===
Fortus founded the band The Eyes in 1984. The four-piece alternative band independently released Freedom in a Cage, which was produced by David Probst. After signing with Atlantic Records, they changed their name to Pale Divine. They subsequently toured the U.S. in support of their only album, Straight to Goodbye, opening for The Psychedelic Furs.

=== Love Spit Love and the Psychedelic Furs (1992–2000) ===
After the Psychedelic Furs split up, Fortus formed Love Spit Love with Richard Butler and Frank Ferrer in 1992. When the Furs re-formed in 2000, Fortus joined the group as second guitarist and played on the live album Beautiful Chaos: Greatest Hits Live. Love Spit Love went on an indefinite hiatus soon after.

Loup Garou (1995–98)

Fortus joined this NYC outfit for club dates and festivals over a three-year hitch that included dates in Europe and culminated with the recording of the band's third CD, Ten Wines from Job's Vineyard.

=== Guns N' Roses (2002–present) ===
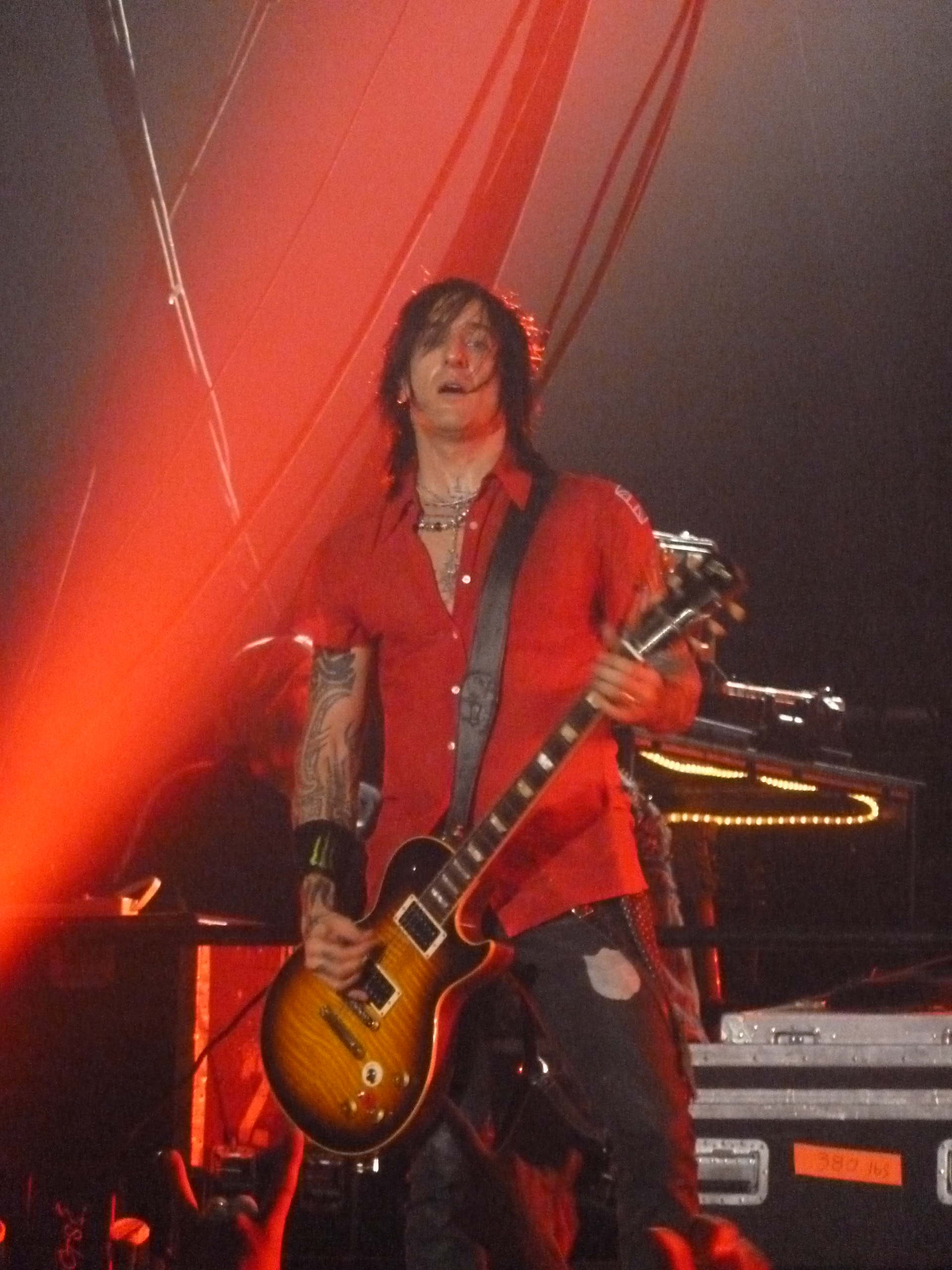
Fortus playing with Guns N' Roses in 2011

In 1999, Fortus was contacted by Guns N' Roses to audition as a potential replacement for the departing Robin Finck. However, the spot was ultimately filled by Buckethead. In 2002, guitarist Paul Tobias left Guns N' Roses, citing stress with touring. Fortus was touring Europe as guitarist for Enrique Iglesias in May 2002 when he got a call from his friend (and Guns N' Roses bassist) Tommy Stinson asking him to fly out to audition for the band. Fortus joined Guns N' Roses officially in July 2002.

In Guns N' Roses, Fortus plays both rhythm guitar and occasional lead guitar. Lead singer Axl Rose is very pleased with Fortus's work and has said, "He's an amazing lead player and very technically skilled. He really likes the pocket that Brain sets and the two of them click with Tommy so we finally have the real deal rhythm section, as Richard is a proven professional. Basically, Richard's the guy that we always were looking for."

Fortus recorded guitars for the band's 2008 album Chinese Democracy and appears on the live release Appetite for Democracy 3D.

Fortus has been present at every tour since 2002, most recently at the Not in This Lifetime... Tour, playing alongside classic-era members Slash and Duff McKagan.

=== The Dead Daisies (2013–16) ===
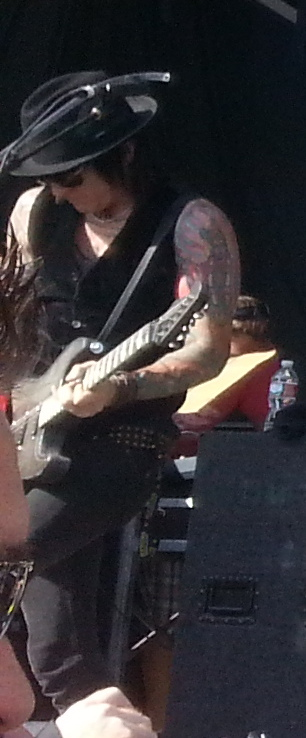
Fortus playing with the Dead Daisies in 2013

In 2013, Fortus joined the Dead Daisies with the likes of Jon Stevens and Dave Lowy as well as Guns N' Roses bandmates Frank Ferrer and Dizzy Reed. Their eponymous debut album was released on August 9, 2013. A second album, Revolucion, was released in 2015. Fortus left the Dead Daisies in 2016 to focus on Guns N' Roses.

=== Other projects ===
Fortus was in a group called Honky Toast with Frank Ferrer, singer Eric J. Toast, and bassist E.Z. Bake. The group released one album, 1999's Watcha Gonna Do Honky?.

Fortus has collaborated with techno-rock musician BT on several occasions, including touring with him in 2000.

In March 2008, Fortus was one of the guest guitarists for the reunion shows of X Japan at the Tokyo Dome. He played with them three more times in 2018: on April 10 and 11 at Zepp Divercity and on April 14 at Coachella.

In 2008, he joined the Danish rock/pop band the Storm on their tour. Fortus played guitar on their first record, Where the Storm Meets the Ground, and is a personal friend of lead singer Pernille Rosendahl and lead guitarist Johan Wohlert.

Fortus provided guitar for former The Replacements and Guns N' Roses bassist Tommy Stinson's two solo albums. Fortus also recorded a cover of the "James Bond Theme" for Guitar Hero World Tour and later played the song live as a solo spot during Guns N' Roses's 2012 tour.

He has collaborated with singer-songwriter Lásse Kvernmo in a project called Sáivu. Fortus has also recorded or toured with acts such as Rihanna, N*SYNC, Nena, and Ben Folds, among others.

Fortus is a member (alongside Ferrer) of New York–based band The Compulsions.

Fortus briefly joined Thin Lizzy as lead guitarist in 2011.

== Equipment ==
Guitars: Paoletti Richard Fortus Signature #2 Guitar in White Leather. Gibson '73 Les Paul Signature, Gretsch White Falcon, Leo Scala, Ivison Dakota One
Effects: Hiwatt Tape Echo, Lexicon PCM80
Pedals: Klon Centaur, Hermida Mosferatu
Amps: 2 channel Cornford, '73 Jose-modded Marshall 100, Plexi Marshalls (modified), Diezel

== Personal life ==
On November 5, 2005, Fortus's partner gave birth to a daughter, Paisley Piper Fortus. She gave birth to a second child, Clover Blue Fortus, on January 6, 2008.

In September 2015, he was seriously injured in a motorcycle crash, causing him to miss dates with the Dead Daisies. Fortus suffered a broken shoulder blade, a broken collarbone, six broken ribs, a broken toe, a bruised lung, a lacerated liver, and a concussion.

On December 10, 2016, Fortus married Stephanie Howlett, a St. Louis–based attorney. The couple resides in St. Louis County, Missouri, with their two daughters.

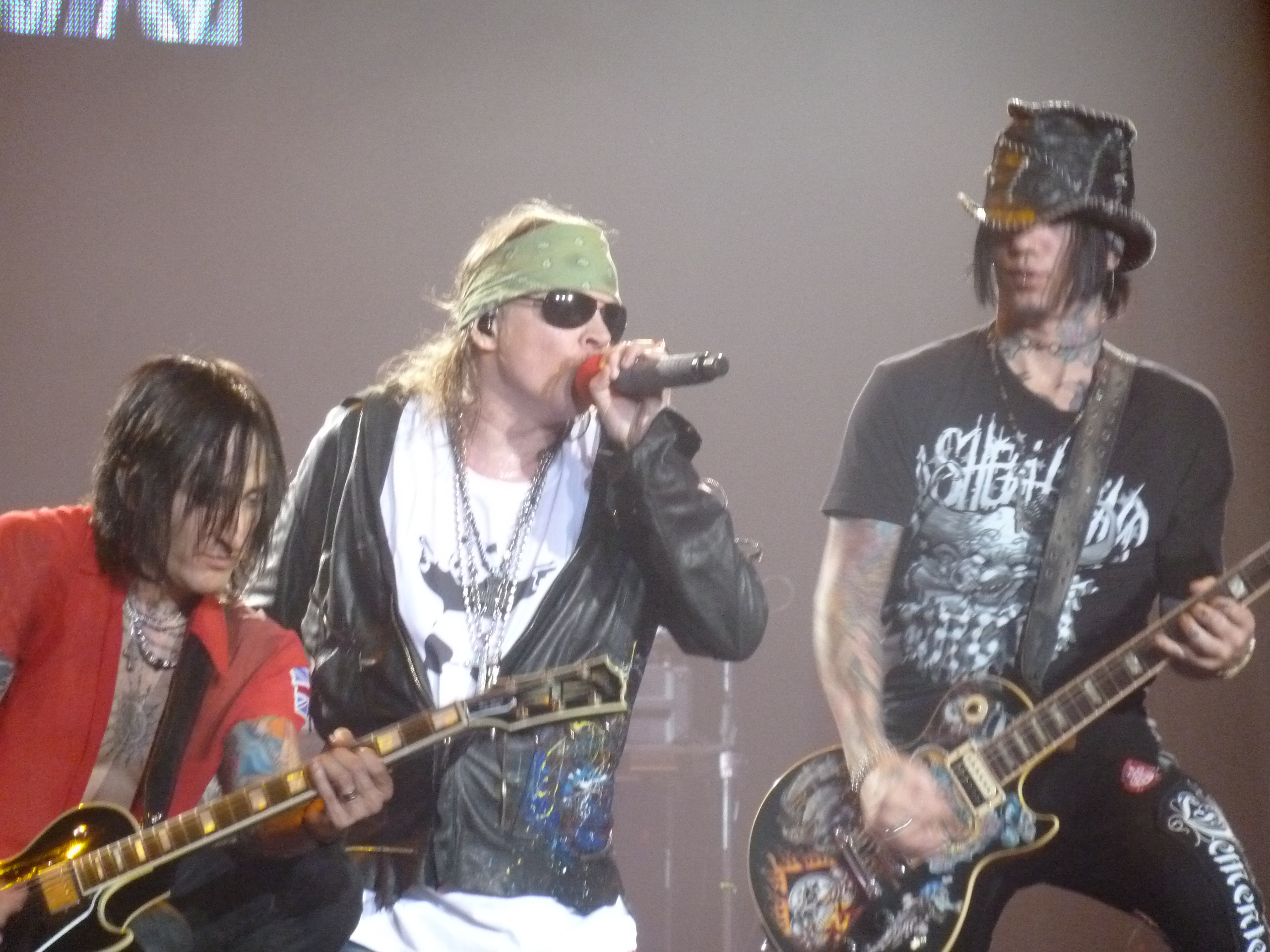
Fortus (left) with Guns N' Roses singer Axl Rose and guitarist DJ Ashba in 2011

== Discography ==
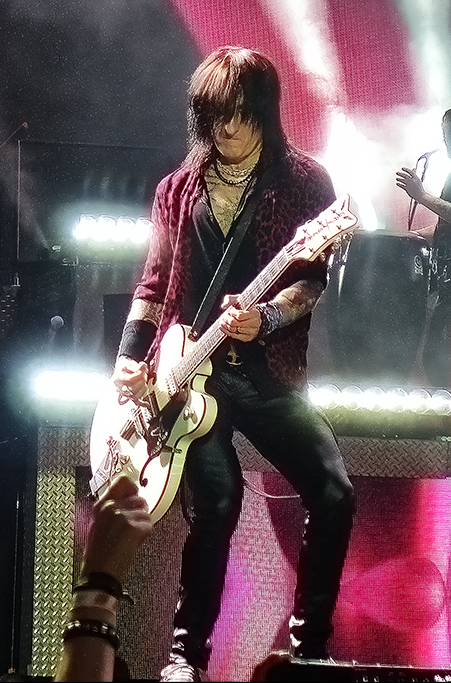
Fortus in 2023.

With The Eyes/Pale Divine

- Freedom in a Cage (1990)
- Straight to Goodbye (1991)

With Love Spit Love

- Love Spit Love (1994)
- Trysome Eatone (1997)

With Tommy Stinson

- Village Gorilla Head (2004)
- One Man Mutiny (2011)

With BT

- Movement in Still Life (1999)
- Emotional Technology (2003)

With Loup Garou:

- Ten Wines from Job's Vineyard (1996)

With Guns N' Roses:

- Chinese Democracy (2008)
- Appetite for Democracy 3D (2014)
- "Hard Skool" / "Absurd" (2021)
- "Perhaps" / "The General" (2023)
- "Nothin'" / "Atlas" (2025)

With Michael Monroe:

- Sensory Overdrive (2011)

With The Dead Daisies:

- The Dead Daisies (2013)
- Revolución (2015)

With The Compulsions:

- Dirty Fun (2015)

With The Psychedelic Furs:

- Beautiful Chaos: Greatest Hits Live (2001)
- Made of Rain (2020)

With Thin Lizzy:

- High Voltage Recorded Live: July 23rd 2011 (2011)

With The Feckers:

- Courage Of Conviction Part II: Live And Learn (2026)
- Courage Of Conviction Part III: In The Face Of Adversity (2028)
