= Marco Mendoza =

American bassist (born 1963)

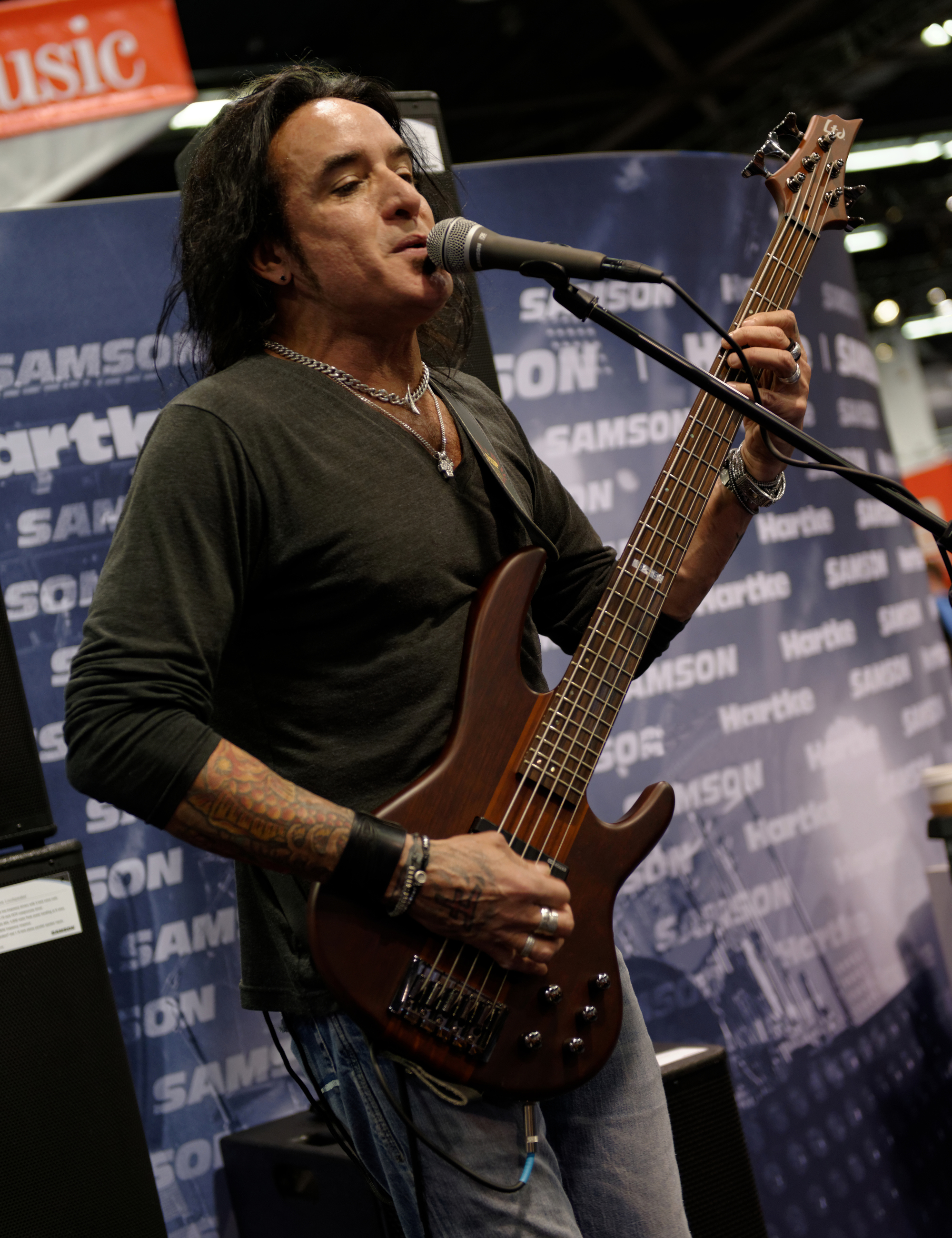
- Mendoza performing in 2014

Background information
- Born: May 3, 1963 (age 63); San Diego, California, U.S.
- Genres: Hard rock; heavy metal; jazz fusion; funk
- Occupation: Musician
- Instruments: Bass; vocals
- Years active: 1989–present
- Member of: Iconic
- Formerly of: Blue Murder; Thin Lizzy; Ted Nugent; Soul SirkUS; Whitesnake; Black Star Riders; The Dead Daisies; Journey
- Website: marcomendoza.com

Marco Mendoza (born 3 May 1963) is an American bass guitarist who has worked in diverse genres. He became a professional rock musician in 1989 and debuted on Black Sabbath drummer Bill Ward's solo album Along the Way. He has performed on a number of notable releases throughout his career, including Live... in the Still of the Night by Whitesnake, One Night Only by Thin Lizzy and Live in Concert at Lollapalooza by Journey.

== Career ==
Marco Mendoza started his professional career in 1989, playing bass for former Black Sabbath drummer Bill Ward's solo album Along the Way, which was released in January 1990. In 1991, he replaced former Heart bassist Steve Fossen in the band Alias in 1991. Mendoza played on the band's second album Never Say Never, but Alias was dropped by Capitol Records in 1992 and the album was shelved. He played in John Sykes' band Blue Murder, from 1992 until 1993. In 1994, he was recruited into a reformed lineup of Thin Lizzy, also featuring Sykes, with guitarist Scott Gorham, keyboard player Darren Wharton and drummer Brian Downey. After some preliminary one-off concerts, the band toured more consistently from 1996 until 2000, replacing the departing Downey with Tommy Aldridge and releasing the live album One Night Only.

From 2000 to 2003, Mendoza recorded and toured with Ted Nugent, and in 2004 he toured with Whitesnake, another band that once featured Sykes and Aldridge, and appeared on their DVD Live... in the Still of the Night. Also in 2004, Mendoza guested on keyboardist Derek Sherinian's solo album Mythology. However, he returned to Thin Lizzy in 2005, replacing Randy Gregg. He left the band in 2007, and subsequently toured with ex-Dokken guitarist George Lynch in his band Lynch Mob.

After Sykes left Thin Lizzy in 2009, Mendoza rejoined the band for a third stint, this time with Gorham, Wharton, Downey, singer Ricky Warwick and guitarist Vivian Campbell. This lineup of Thin Lizzy toured Europe throughout 2011, before a US tour at the end of the year, and a further tour of Europe in early 2012.

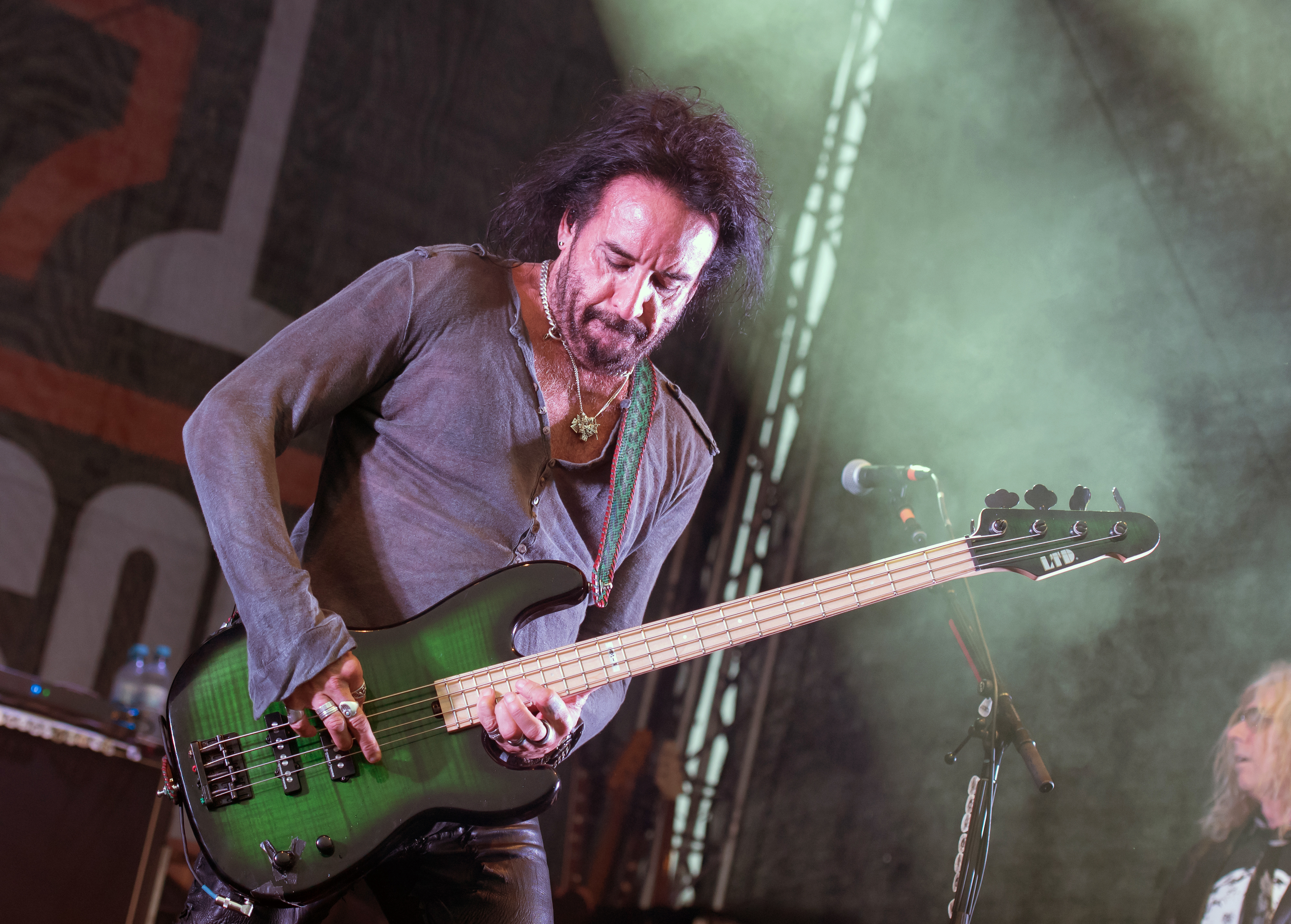
Mendoza performing with The Dead Daisies in 2017

On July 6, 2007, Mendoza released his first solo album Live for Tomorrow, through Frontiers Records in Europe. The record was produced and co-written by Richie Kotzen and features guest performances by Steve Lukather, Ted Nugent, Doug Aldrich, Tommy Aldridge, Brian Tichy, Marco Rentería of Jaguares, and others.

Mendoza has also played for the band Soul SirkUS and with many other artists from different musical backgrounds including: Bill Ward, Right Said Fred, Robert Williams, Roch Voisine, Dolores O'Riordan, Tim "Ripper" Owens, and Tommy Shaw.

When not touring, Mendoza has played with his band Mendoza Heredia Neto, featuring drummer Joey Heredia and keyboard player Renato Neto, on Tuesday nights at La Ve Lee Jazz Club in Studio City. The band has recorded a live CD, Live in L.A.

In December 2012, Mendoza co-founded the Thin Lizzy spin-off band, Black Star Riders. Black Star Riders' first album All Hell Breaks Loose was released in May 2013.

On May 30, 2014, it was announced that Mendoza was leaving Black Star Riders at the end of the contemporaneous US tour to work on other projects.

Mendoza joined Neal Schon's side project, Neal Schon's Journey Through Time, along with fellow The Dead Daisies member Deen Castronovo.

In April 2022, Mendoza was announced as the bassist for the supergroup Iconic, featuring Michael Sweet, Joel Hoekstra, Tommy Aldridge, and Nathan James. The band's debut album was called Second Skin. They released a lead single, entitled "Nowhere to Run".

In 2022, he was announced as the new bassist and vocalist for the Russian band Gorky Park.

Since 2022 he has also been touring regularly with the fusion guitarist Roman Miroshnichenko.

In June 2025, Mendoza joined the SatchVaiBand for their Surfing with the Hydra 2025 Tour.

== Discography ==
=== Solo albums ===
- Live for Tomorrow (2007)
- Casa Mendoza (2010)
- Viva La Rock (2018)
- Take It To The Limit (2022)

=== Other collaborations ===
- 1990 Ward One: Along the Way (Bill Ward)
- 1992 Never Say Never (Alias) shelved, independently released in 2009
- 1993 Nothin' But Trouble (Blue Murder)
- 1994 Screaming Blue Murder (Blue Murder)
- 1995 Real World (Tin Drum)
- 1995 Out of My Tree (John Sykes)
- 1996 Feels Good (Michael Ruff)
- 1996 Smashing! (Right Said Fred)
- 1996 Kissing Rain (Roch Voisine)
- 1997 Loveland (John Sykes)
- 1997 Sugar Cane (Rafael Aragon)
- 1997 20th Century (John Sykes)
- 1998 Date with the Devil's Daughter (Robert Williams)
- 1998 7 Deadly Zens (Tommy Shaw)
- 1998 Live in L.A. (Mendoza Heredia Neto)
- 2000 One Night Only (Thin Lizzy)
- 2000 Into the Light (David Coverdale)
- 2000 Nuclear Cowboy (John Sykes)
- 2001 Full Bluntal Nugity (Ted Nugent)
- 2002 Craveman (Ted Nugent)
- 2004 Mythology (Derek Sherinian)
- 2004 Bad Boy Live! (John Sykes)
- 2005 World Play (Soul SirkUS)
- 2006 Live... in the Still of the Night (Whitesnake)
- 2007 Are You Listening? (Dolores O'Riordan)
- 2009 Play My Game (Tim "Ripper" Owens)
- 2008 Earth Tones (Adrian Galysh)
- 2009 No Baggage (Dolores O'Riordan)
- 2009 Smoke and Mirrors (Lynch Mob)
- 2010 La Famiglia Superstar (La Famiglia Superstar)
- 2011 Brown Eyed Soul (Steve Saluto)
- 2013 All Hell Breaks Loose (Black Star Riders)
- 2014 So U (Neal Schon)
- 2014 Kill The King (WAMI)
- 2015 Revolución (The Dead Daisies)
- 2016 Make Some Noise (The Dead Daisies)
- 2016 Night Train (Jericho Summer)
- 2017 Live & Louder (The Dead Daisies)
- 2018 Burn It Down (The Dead Daisies)
- 2022 Second Skin (Iconic)

=== Tribute albums ===
- 1999 Little Guitars: A Tribute to Van Halen
- 2001 Metallic Assault: A Tribute to Metallica
- 2001 Stone Cold Queen: A Tribute
- 2002 Pigs and Pyramids: An All Star Lineup Performing the Songs of Pink Floyd
- 2002 One Way Street: A Tribute to Aerosmith
