= The Dead Daisies (album) =

Studio album by The Dead Daisies
- Released: August 9, 2013
- Studio: Studio Wishbone, Hollywood, California, Sing Sing Studios Melbourne, Australia (track 2)
- Genre: Hard rock
- Length: 44:25
- Label: Spitfire Music
- Producer: John Fields, Jon Stevens

The Dead Daisies chronology
The Dead Daisies (2013)	Revolución (2015)

Singles from The Dead Daisies
- 1. "Lock 'n' Load" Released: April 19, 2013; 2. "It's Gonna Take Time" Released: January 21, 2014; 3. "Angel in Your Eyes" Released: October 20, 2014

Professional ratings
Review scores
Source	Rating
Blabbermouth.net	7.5/10

The Dead Daisies is the debut album by the Australian-American rock band the Dead Daisies, featuring vocalist Jon Stevens and guitar player David Lowy. The album was produced by John Fields.

The album was released on August 9, 2013, and its lead single "Lock 'n' Load", featuring Slash, on April 19. It was also a bonus CD on the issue 191 of the UK music magazine Classic Rock.

== Track listing ==
All lyrics are written by Jon Stevens.

No.	Title	Music	Length
1.	"It's Gonna Take Time"	David Lowy, Vanessa Amorosi, John Fields	3:21
2.	"Lock 'n' Load" (featuring Slash)	Slash	4:38
3.	"Washington"	Lowy	3:19
4.	"Yeah Yeah Yeah"	Lowy	3:23
5.	"Yesterday"	Lowy	3:50
6.	"Writing on the Wall"	Lowy	3:19
7.	"Miles in Front of Me"	Lowy, Fields, Mike Reukberg	3:26
8.	"Bible Row"	Lowy, Amorosi	3:01
9.	"Man Overboard"	Lowy	3:03
10.	"Tomorrow"	Lowy, Amorosi, Fields	2:45
11.	"Can't Fight This Feeling"	Lowy, Amorosi, Fields	3:13
12.	"Talk to Me"	Lowy	3:07
Total length:			44:25

== Personnel ==
All credits adapted from the original release.

Musicians

- Jon Stevens – vocals, guitar, acoustic guitar and producer on "Lock 'n' Load"
- David Lowy – guitar
- John Fields – bass, guitar, keyboards, percussion, organ on "Lock 'n' Load", producer, engineer, mixing
- Kevin Savigar – keyboards
- Dorian Crozier – drums
- Isaac Carpenter – drums on "Yesterday" and "Tomorrow"
- Vanessa Amorosi – vocals
- Slash – lead guitar on "Lock 'n' Load"
- Simon Hosford – bass, electric and acoustic guitar, engineer on "Lock 'n' Load"
- Johnny Salerno – drums on "Lock 'n' Load"

Production

- Aaron Dobos, C. Todd Nielsen – assistant engineers
- Paul David Hager – mixing
- Howie Weinberg – mastering
