= The Dead Daisies =

Australian-American rock band

- The Dead Daisies

Background information
- Origin: Sydney, Australia
- Genre: Hard rock
- Years active: 2013–present
- Labels: Spitfire; SPV
- Members: David Lowy; Doug Aldrich; Tommy Clufetos; Kelly Hansen; Jimi Crutchley
- Past members: Alan Mansfield; Jon Stevens; Frank Ferrer; Jim Hilbun; Darryl Jones; Charley Drayton; John Tempesta; Bernard Fowler; Dizzy Reed; Richard Fortus; Marco Mendoza; Brian Tichy; Michael Devin; John Corabi; Deen Castronovo; Glenn Hughes
- Website: thedeaddaisies.com

The Dead Daisies are an Australian-American hard rock band formed in Sydney in 2013. Since their formation they have assembled a rotating lineup of musicians who have otherwise played with groups including Whitesnake, Black Sabbath, and Foreigner, among others. Although functioning as a sort of "supergroup" during its history, the band has been spearheaded by guitarist David Lowy while its various live and studio based releases have come out. The group's eponymous debut album was released by Spitfire Music in August 2013.

== History ==
=== Formation, debut album, and first tour (2013) ===
The Dead Daisies were formed in the city of Sydney within Australia by musicians Jon Stevens (formerly of the bands Noiseworks and INXS) and David Lowy (formerly of the bands Mink and Red Phoenix) in 2013. The singer-songwriter and guitarist got together after David Edwards, a music industry figure known for serving as ex-manager of INXS, had reintroduced them.

The band's self-titled debut album was recorded in two weeks at Wishbone Studios in Los Angeles in 2013 with American producer/engineer and multi-instrumentalist John Fields. The album was released in North America on 9 August 2013 through Caroline/Universal, and later released in the United Kingdom in mid-November 2013. "Lock N' Load", their first single, was co-written by Slash (the lead guitarist of Guns N' Roses), who also played guitar on the track. The song was a Rolling Stone magazine Daily Download on 25 July 2013 and was also available on the website of BBC Radio 2. The song's music video appeared on more than 20 outlets, including Much Music. The single was released in the United Kingdom on 28 October 2013.

The band toured in 2013, including opening for ZZ Top and joining Aerosmith on their Australian and New Zealand tour. This was followed by the 25-date Uproar Festival in August and September 2013 (with Jane's Addiction and Alice in Chains, among others). These shows were performed by the first full lineup of the band, which consisted of Lowy and Stevens along with drummer Frank Ferrer (also of Guns N' Roses), guitarist Richard Fortus (also of Guns N' Roses, formerly of Thin Lizzy and Psychedelic Furs), bassist Marco Mendoza (Whitesnake/Thin Lizzy), and pianist Dizzy Reed (from Guns N' Roses). Lead singer Stevens performed for a while with casts on his hand and leg as a result of an injury sustained when escaping from a crocodile on a fishing excursion in Australia.

=== Lineup changes and Cuba Rocks (2013–2015) ===
In the fall of 2013 the band played 18 shows in the United Kingdom with the Black Star Riders with new recruits Charley Drayton (who has performed with Divinyls, the Cult, the Rolling Stones, Mariah Carey, Johnny Cash, Miles Davis, Bob Dylan, Herbie Hancock, Janet Jackson, Chaka Khan, Courtney Love, Iggy Pop, Seal, Paul Simon, and Neil Young, among others) on drums and Darryl Jones (longtime supporting musician for the Rolling Stones) on bass (instead of Marco Mendoza). On 20 November, they played the Underworld rock club in Camden, their first UK show as headliners. The band finished off their touring schedule in 2013 with a gig at The Barby in Tel Aviv, Israel.

"Lock N' Load" was also played at football stadiums, including at Wembley Stadium in London during the sold-out NFL American football game between the Jacksonville Jaguars and the San Francisco 49ers on 27 October.

Coinciding with the tour of the UK, Britain's Classic Rock magazine included a feature on The Dead Daisies in its November 2013 issue. The band was also November's spotlight artist on the Metal Hammer and Classic Rock websites. In a Classic Rock magazine poll, "Lock N' Load" was voted 15th best song out of 100 songs of 2013.

In February 2014, The Dead Daisies regrouped with the line-up of Lowy, Stevens, Fortus, and Reed, with a returning Mendoza and new drummer John Tempesta (the Cult) to undertake their first full headline Australian tour, plus shows supporting Australian rocker Jimmy Barnes for two shows: Twilight At Taronga, at Taronga Zoo in Sydney, and at the Bateau Bay Hotel.

The band embarked on two US tours in 2014, joining the Bad Company and Lynyrd Skynyrd tour in July, followed by the Heroes Tour with Kiss and Def Leppard in August.

During the summer of 2014, The Dead Daisies released the EP Face I Love with four new recordings: "Face I Love", "Angel in Your Eyes", "Your Karma", and a cover of the Beatles' "Helter Skelter". Along with the EP, a Facebook app was launched where fans would send in pictures of themselves to try and win prizes.

At the end of October 2014, The Dead Daisies were invited to join the fourth Kiss Kruise, which sailed from Miami to the Bahamas.

The band finished their touring in 2014 with a second visit to New Zealand as guests of Jimmy Barnes under the banner of the 'Angel In Your Eyes' tour to coincide with the release of the same-titled single, with four dates in Auckland, Dunedin, Christchurch and Hamilton, followed by a headline tour of Australia. The Dead Daisies played their first ever headline shows in Perth on 4 December and Brisbane on 5 December.

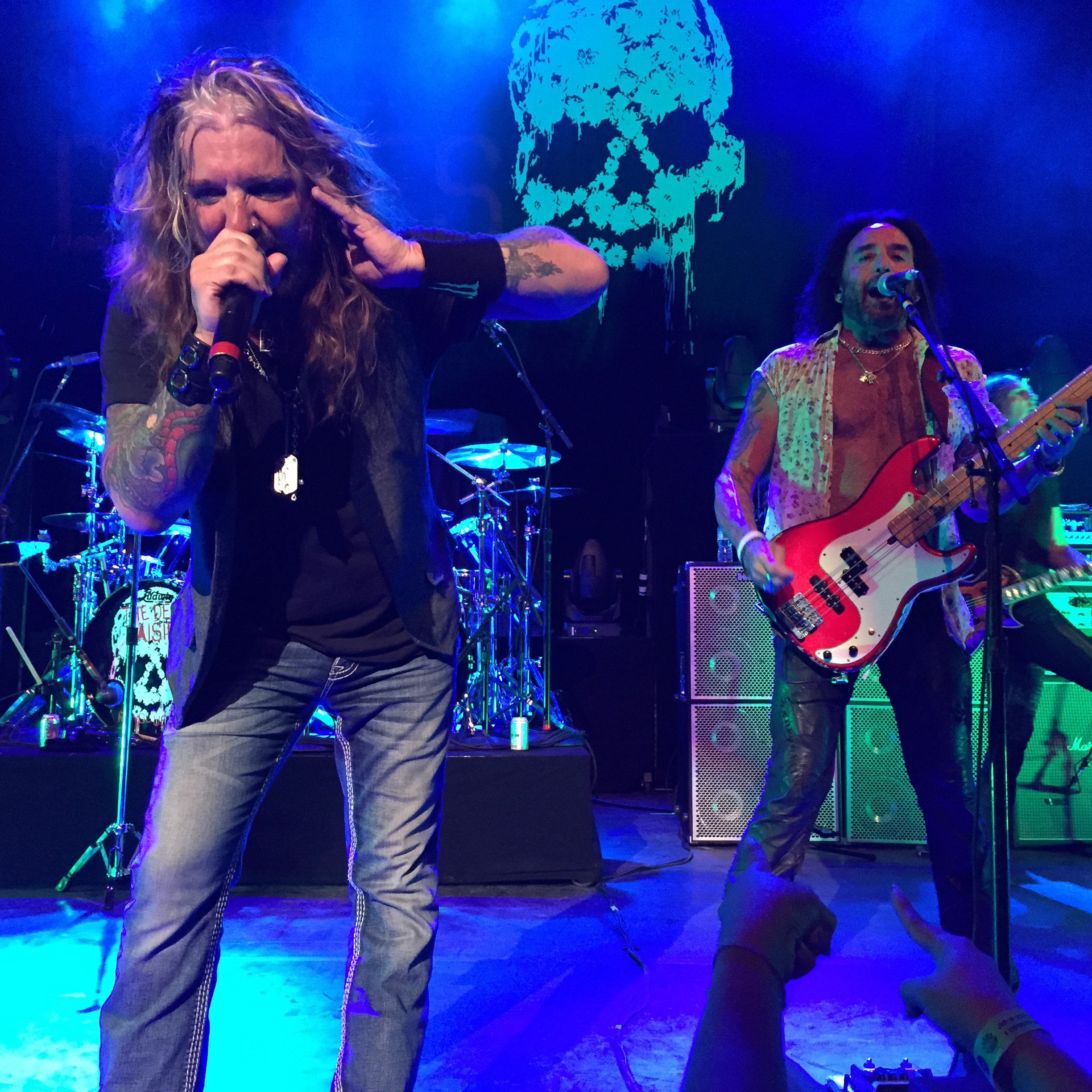
John Corabi and Marco Mendoza of The Dead Daisies performing at College Street Music Hall in New Haven, Connecticut, 2015

In late February 2015, The Dead Daisies became the first American rock band to play Cuba since the Obama administration reopened trade ties and made history as part of a cultural exchange as guests of the Cuban Ministry of Culture, Cuban Institute of Music and the Cuban Rock Agency. This tour saw Lowy, Fortus and Reed joined by returning bassist Darryl Jones, in addition to which vocalists John Corabi (frontman of Mötley Crüe for 1992–1996) and Bernard Fowler (longtime backing vocalist for the Rolling Stones) joined the band in place of the absent Stevens. During their visit, the band jammed in studio with Cuban musicians, played an energetic sold-out show at Havana's Maxim Rock Club, visited young Cuban musicians at the National Institute of Music, and finished with a performance at the Concert for Peace (Roc Por La Paz) in front of over 6,000 fans. David Lowy said the band members had immersed themselves in Cuban culture and it was "one of the best musical experiences of my life".

=== Jon Stevens' departure, John Corabi confirmation and Revolución (2015) ===
On 16 April 2015, The Dead Daisies officially announced John Corabi would remain with the band as lead vocalist, and that Jon Stevens would no longer be a member of the group. The band headed for Sydney, Australia, and with drummer Jackie Barnes, son of Jimmy Barnes, sitting in, booked into Studios 301 with co-producer Craig Porteils (Guns N' Roses/Billy Idol), to complete the recording of their second album, Revolución.

In June 2015 the band, featuring Tommy Clufetos (formerly with Black Sabbath, Ozzy Osbourne and Rob Zombie) on drums, supported Kiss again on their European tour, and also took in the Rock in Vienna Festival, Download Festival UK and Graspop Metal Meeting Belgium. The Dead Daisies continued to support the Kiss tour on its Australian leg in October 2015.

In late July 2015, The Dead Daisies joined Whitesnake for a limited tour in the US that ran until mid August. The groups met up for their first US show in Westbury, New York, and finished things off in St. Charles, Missouri, bringing American audiences the album Revolución as well as the world premiere of the documentary, titled the same, of their historic trip to Cuba on Twitter. In October 2015, The Dead Daisies joined Kiss for the Australian leg of the Kiss Tour finishing on the Kiss Kruise V. In November 2015, The Dead Daisies rejoined Whitesnake in Moscow, Russia touring across Europe, making a stop to join Judas Priest in Frankfurt, Germany.

=== Doug Aldrich, Make Some Noise, and Live and Louder (2016–2017) ===
On 28 January 2016, it was announced that Richard Fortus (2013–2016) and Dizzy Reed (2013–2016) would be taking part in the Guns N' Roses "Not in This Lifetime... Tour" and that Doug Aldrich (2016–present) would join the band on lead guitar. No replacement was announced for Dizzy Reed. Aldrich had also performed with Whitesnake, among others. With Aldrich, the band recorded their new album Make Some Noise in Nashville with producer Marti Frederiksen (Aerosmith, Gavin Rossdale, Mötley Crüe, Buckcherry) during February and March 2016. Make Some Noise was released globally on SPV Records on 5 August. The band also announced European dates and a US tour with Kiss for the summer as well as their first Japanese show at Loud Park festival in October.

The Dead Daisies kicked off their 2016 live appearances as special guests at Musikmesse Frankfurt with performances on the main stage followed by a guest slot with all-star band The Hollywood Vampires in Germany. On 14 July the group set off on the Make Some Noise Tour at Bang Your Head Festival in Balingen, Germany. The Dead Daisies played several more festivals as well as their own sold-out shows throughout the UK and Europe including an acoustic show at Hard Rock Cafe in Prague and at Maidstone's prestigious 'Ramblin' Man Fair' on 23 July 2016, finishing their European run at Komplex 457 in Zurich, Switzerland. The band released their much-anticipated third studio album, Make Some Noise, on 5 August 2016.

On 10 August 2016, The Dead Daisies joined Kiss on their "Freedom To Rock Tour" with shows across the US. For the first time, The Dead Daisies included headline concerts in Los Angeles at the famous Whisky-A-Go-Go and Webster Hall in New York. After doing a show for fans of the NFL team Arizona Cardinals, the album's title track, 'Make Some Noise', was adopted for their touchdown song.

In October, The Dead Daisies paid their first visit to Japan, to play the Loud Park Festival. They continued their journey with their first USO Tour playing shows for the US Military services in South Korea. In early November, the band rejoined Kiss on the Kiss Kruise VI for a record third time, then set off for a massive UK and European trek on a co-headline tour with Irish rock band the Answer to finish off 2016 with tickets selling out well in advance.

On 19 May 2017, The Dead Daisies released their new album, Live And Louder, featuring sixteen songs recorded during the UK/Europe Tour from the fall of 2016. Included is a 'Live And Louder' documentary DVD showcasing the 'Make Some Noise World Tour' and selected acoustic tracks along with a massive photo booklet. A headline tour throughout the world headed to the US via a special concert at Woodstock in Poland with a full orchestra.

The band has performed at the cream of the European Festivals including Download Festival, Sweden Rock Festival, Rock Hard Festival, Hellfest and Graspop Metal Meeting. Enthusiastic Japanese fans had clamored for the band to return to 'The Land of the Rising Sun' so they did to two sold-out shows in Osaka and Tokyo in July. After leaving Japan, the band headed to South America for the first time and played concerts in Brazil, Argentina and Chile before playing a sold-out gig in Mexico City.

In a major spectacular, the band played the Woodstock Festival in Poland along with the Gorzów Philharmonic Orchestra to hundreds of thousands in the audience before heading back to the US for their first headline tour. Aptly titled 'The Dirty Dozen' kicked off in August and saw the band storm through major cities across North America including New York, Chicago, Toronto, Los Angeles and finishing up in Las Vegas. They have partnered with sports organizations like the New York Yankees and NASCAR as well as working on a promotion with Harley-Davidson including three exclusive biker shows at Sturgis Full Throttle Saloon on 9 August and two shows at the start of September, the Easyriders Rodeo Tour in Ohio and the National HOG Rally in Milwaukee.

=== Deen Castronovo and Burn It Down (2017–2018) ===
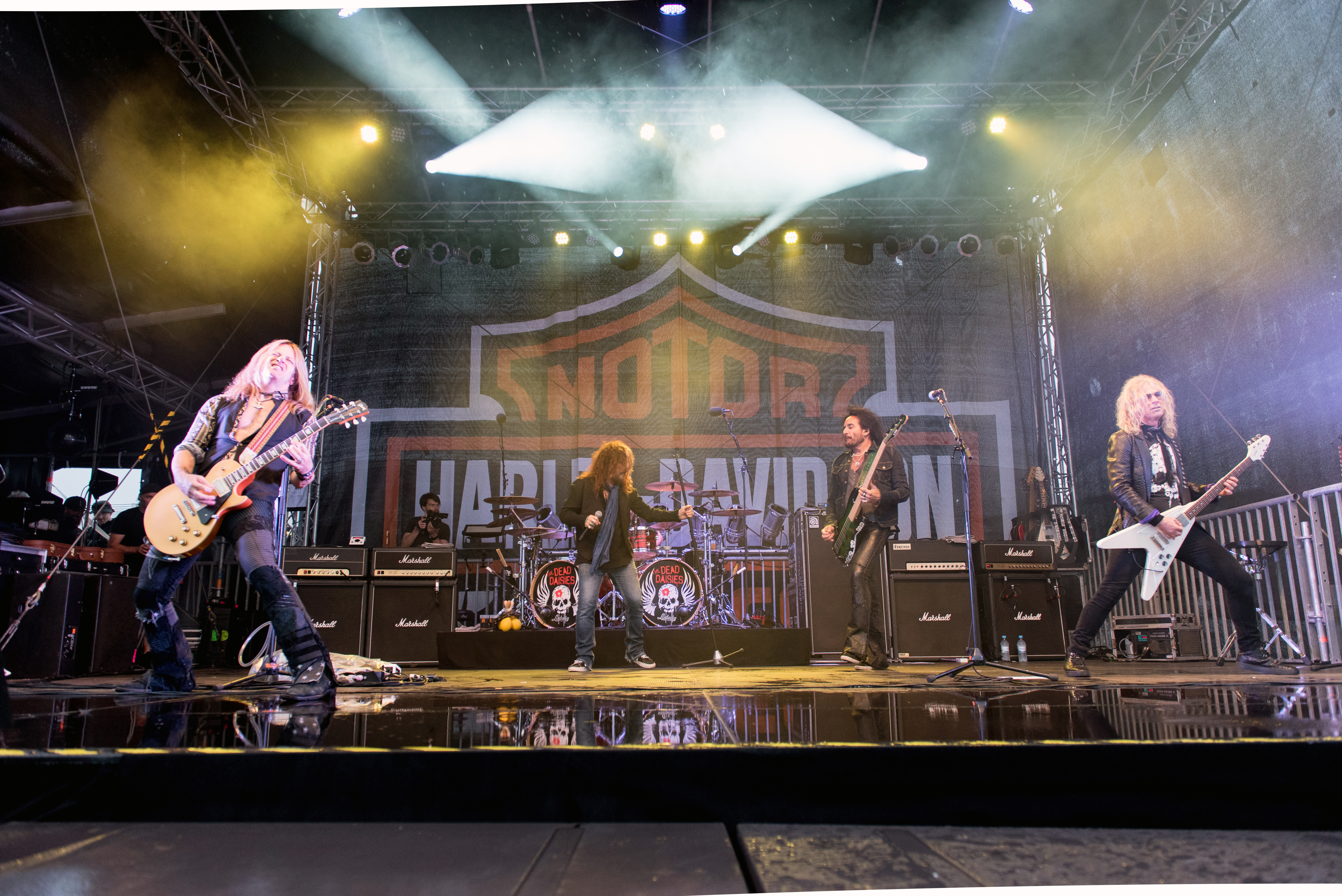
The Dead Daisies performing in 2017

On 4 November 2017, it was announced that Deen Castronovo, formerly of Journey and Bad English, would be taking over drumming duties moving forward. As of this date the band, with Corabi, Aldrich, Lowy, Mendoza and Castronovo, was in Nashville, Tennessee began the recording of a new album.

In January 2018, the band announced its pending album Burn It Down, released on 6 April. The album is available in multiple formats including CD, colored vinyl, picture disk vinyl and digital download. The band simultaneously announced a 26-date UK and European tour beginning 8 April in Glasgow, UK.

On 9 March, The Dead Daisies released the first single from the new album. The song, 'Rise Up', is a protest song asking everyone to rise up against everything that is wrong with the world today.

The band started a European tour on 16 April after spending a week in the UK playing their first sold-out tour. In June, the band played three shows in Japan. Throughout July, the band played a series of dates including festivals in Europe and guest slots with the Scorpions in Portugal and Guns N' Roses in Estonia.

The Dead Daisies began their North America tour on 15 August, touring 24 cities with former band member Dizzy Reed making a special appearance as part of the support act Hookers & Blow.

The band headed to the Kiss Kruise at the end of October for the fourth time, where they set sail for Key West and Nassau. After this they headed straight to the UK and Europe for a series of dates including Hard Rock Hell, Monstersfest and WinterStorm. Dates in Italy, France, Croatia, Hungary, Austria, Holland, Belgium, Spain, Portugal and Germany took them to the middle of December 2018 and the end of the tour.

=== Welcome to Daisyland and Locked and Loaded (2019) ===
February 2019 saw the launch of an online horror television series called 'Welcome to Daisyland'. The Dead Daisies feature in some of the episodes and their music from the 2018 album Burn It Down is used as the soundtrack. Some of the songs featured include 'Dead and Gone' and 'Burn It Down'. On 14 February, new single 'Dead and Gone' swamp version, which is an acoustic version of the track, was released in conjunction with the first episode.

With the various members of the band working on solo projects, the band are off the road. Apart from the 'Welcome To Daisyland' horror series, they have also released a series of cover songs recorded at acoustic performances which have included 'My Generation' by the Who, 'Ramble On' by Led Zeppelin, 'Maggie May' by Rod Stewart and 'We're An American Band' by Grand Funk Railroad. 'Song and a Prayer' and 'Fortunate Son' acoustic versions, which were originally recorded for an American Airlines promotion, were then released on Spotify.

On 7 June 2019, the debut album from 2013 was available for the first time on vinyl.

German music duo Twocolors did a mix of the track "Make Some Noise", released as a dance mix titled "Make It Louder".

On 23 August 2019, the band released Locked and Loaded, a collection of cover songs recorded both live and in the studio. "Fortunate Son" and "Join Together" were available on digital platforms before the album was released.

=== Glenn Hughes, "Righteous Days", Holy Ground and Radiance (2019–2022) ===
In September 2019, the band debuted a new track, 'Righteous Days', on Planet Rock Radio in the UK. It was also announced that Glenn Hughes would join the collective as lead singer and bassist.

In November 2019, the band headed to the south of France to begin writing and recording the next album, which would be the first with Glenn Hughes. They spent two weeks in November and two weeks in December at La Fabrique Studios in Saint-Rémy de Provence (south of France) working with producer Ben Grosse. The new album was to have been released in 2020.

At the beginning of 2020, finishing touches and final mixing of the next album was completed with producer Ben Grosse. In February, a European tour starting at the end of May 2020 and stretching into July was announced but later postponed due to the COVID-19 pandemic. In June it was announced that the band would be playing a few shows with Foreigner in Germany and Poland starting in Hamburg on 6 June 2021. In addition, it was announced that the band would also do a number of dates in Europe in summer 2021 with Judas Priest. On 17 April, 'Unspoken', the first single from the forthcoming album, was released. On May 15, US dance duo Dance With The Dead released a remix version of 'Unspoken'. On 17 July 2020 'The Lockdown Sessions' EP was released by the band on digital platforms. The band later announced that the release of Holy Ground, as well as a supporting tour, had been pushed back to 22 January 2021. The next single to be released by the band was 'Bustle and Flow' on 25 September. The song reached number 15 on the Billboard Mainstream Rock Chart. On 4 December the next single, 'Holy Ground', which is also the title track of the forthcoming album, was released and was added to the Planet Rock 'A' playlist. On 11 January the European tour due to start in February was postponed due to the worldwide pandemic.

2021 saw the release of the fifth studio album, Holy Ground. The album came out on 22 January and was met with global praise from both fans and music critics. Featuring 11 songs including three singles to date, the album reached the top 10 on many international rock charts. Castrovano left the band after suffering from back problems, and Tommy Clufetos, who had previously joined the band for the European tour in 2015, returned as his replacement. On 5 March, the latest song to be promoted by the band was 'Chosen and Justified', which had proved a popular track on the album among fans. On April 30 the band announced a set of warm-up dates around the US in June and July. On 7 May, The Dead Daisies had a series of big announcements and releases. 'Like No Other', the fifth single, was released with a new mix including returning drummer Tommy Clufetos on drums. This was accompanied by video animation which also tied into a new mobile video game, 'Daisys Revenge', which featured the band's music. Also announced was the World Tour for 2021/22 including dates in the UK, US, Japan and Europe. On 23 June, the band commenced their first tour in two and a half years with the US 'Get Out of the House' tour, starting at the Kelsey Theatre in Lake Park Florida. This was the first show with Glenn Hughes. On 6 August, the single 'My Fate' was released on digital platforms. On 13 August, a short film inspired by the recent US tour and song 'Like No Other' was premiered with an inspiring and positive message going forward and leading back to live music once more. The band kicked off the 'Like No Other' Tour 2021 in the US on 10 September 10 in Rockford Illinois. On 17 September 'Saving Grace' was released as a single on digital platforms and the October/November UK dates were announced. The band had a successful run of shows in the UK with packed audiences at the Shepherds Bush O2 Empire in London and Rock City in Nottingham, as well as Birmingham, Liverpool, Bristol, Oxford, Norwich and Cardiff.

2022 saw the band kick off the year with a Best Album Award at the Banger Awards in the United States. The first release of the year was a live recording of 'Rise Up' recorded in Nottingham on the UK 2021 Like No Other tour as part of a series of live tracks called Live from Daisyland.

On 3 June, the band embarked on their first European tour in over three years with some headline shows, festival shows and guest slots to Foreigner and Judas Priest. The band released their first new single from their forthcoming album at the end of May. 'Radiance' was released with a new animated video and online platform with the alternate version of the band, The Meta Daisies, with which one could spend some time in a virtual bar with fellow fans listening to the track. This was followed by the next single 'Shine On' to coincide with the European tour. This was followed by 'Hypnotize Yourself' in August with the fourth single 'Face Your Fear' coming on 2 September. The band embarked on their latest US Tour on 7 September starting at the Landis Theater in Vineland, New Jersey, and finishing at The Crocodile in Seattle on 24 September. On 30 September, the latest album 'Radiance' was released to favorable reviews. 11 November saw the release of the latest single 'Born To Fly', inspired by David Lowy's background as a pilot, ahead of the UK tour beginning on 3 December in Nottingham.

=== John Corabi returns, 'Best Of' album, tour and Light 'Em Up and Lookin' For Trouble (2023–present) ===
On 19 May 2023, it was announced that John Corabi had returned to The Dead Daises' line-up, and then, in addition, bassist Michael Devin joined the group for the first time. The latter musician had previously served in the band Whitesnake. A 'Best Of' album was released on 18 August of that year. The band set off on the Resurrected Tour in August with dates in Canada and US with the tour continuing in Japan from the end of October and then to Europe for a November tour. They returned in December for the final tour of 2023 finishing on 16 December at the Knock Out Festival in Karlsruhe, Germany.

During March 2024, the band returned to the studio to record the next album. The US Tour was announced on 18 March, starting on June 6 in New York with drummer Tommy Clufetos rejoining the band. On 26 April 2024, the band announced they would be releasing a new single, "Light 'Em Up", on 10 May; it is the title track to the band's upcoming new album, due on 6 September. The band announced both the UK and European tour on 26 April. After completing a successful US Tour in June, the band return to the road in September when they will commence the UK tour on 6 September and return to Europe in November. Along with the latest single, 'Light 'Em Up', released on 10 May, a new music video was also released. On 2 August, the latest single 'I'm Gonna Ride' was released along with a pre order for the new album 'Light 'Em Up'. The Light 'Em Up album was released on 6 September, the same day that the band began their UK tour.

In November 2024, the band toured Europe and performed shows in Austria, Belgium, Czechia, France, Germany, Hungary, the Netherlands, and Switzerland. Reb Beach filled in for Doug Aldrich due to the latter musician's health issues. Several of these concerts included special guest, the iconic Danish singer-songwriter Mike Tramp, with him being known for his work in groups such as White Lion.

The band announced a European tour for March 2025 where they played dates in Germany, Italy, Switzerland, Netherlands and France. On 14 February the band released the latest single from the 'Light 'Em Up' album, 'Love That'll Never Be'. This was followed on the 28th February with the release of a cover of the Robert Johnson Blues classic 'Crossroads' which came from their forthcoming Blues album. On 25 April the single 'Boom Boom' a cover of the John Lee Hooker blues classic was released. On 30 May the Blues album 'Lookin' For Trouble' was released worldwide. The band embarked on a second European tour in June where they played Graspop in Belgium. On August 13, the band commenced their latest UK tour in Belfast and played a total of 8 dates including a special guest slot at Stonedead festival on 23 August. 'Live At Stonedead' was released on the 14th November on all digital and streaming platforms. This was a live album recorded at the band's last concert of 2025 at the Stonedead Festival in Newark, England.

On December 5, 2025, the band announced a UK and European tour for March 2027 with shows in the UK, Germany, the Netherlands, the Czech Republic, Italy, France, and Switzerland.

Despite taking a break from touring, the band released Live Plus Five on May 1st 2026, capturing the energy of their acclaimed Stonedead Festival performance alongside additional live recordings from Europe the USA, and UK.

While Corabi was off recording and promoting a solo album, the band performed with their previous singer, Glenn Hughes under the name The Purple Daisies, playing songs by The Dead Daisies and Deep Purple. In mid-2026, Corabi said that he and Devin were unclear with their status with The Dead Daisies. Four days later, it was announced Corabi had parted ways the band.

On October 5, 2026, Kelly Hansen (formerly of Foreigner) was announced as the new vocalist for the band, and a new single, "Lift Me Up", was released worldwide. Tour dates for Europe, UK and the USA for 2027 were also announced. In the announcement, it was also revealed that Jimi Crutchley had joined the band, replacing bassist Michael Devin.

== Band members ==
Current members

- David Lowy – rhythm guitar (2013–present)
- Doug Aldrich – lead guitar, backing vocals (2016–present)
- Tommy Clufetos – drums (2015 touring, 2021–2022, 2024–present)
- Kelly Hansen – lead vocals (2026–present)
- Jimi Crutchley – bass, backing vocals (2026–present)

== Discography ==
Studio albums

- The Dead Daisies (2013)
- Revolución (2015)
- Make Some Noise (2016)
- Burn It Down (2018)
- Holy Ground (2021)
- Radiance (2022)
- Light 'Em Up (2024)
- Lookin' for Trouble (2025)
