= David Lowy =

Australian businessman and musician

David H Lowy AM
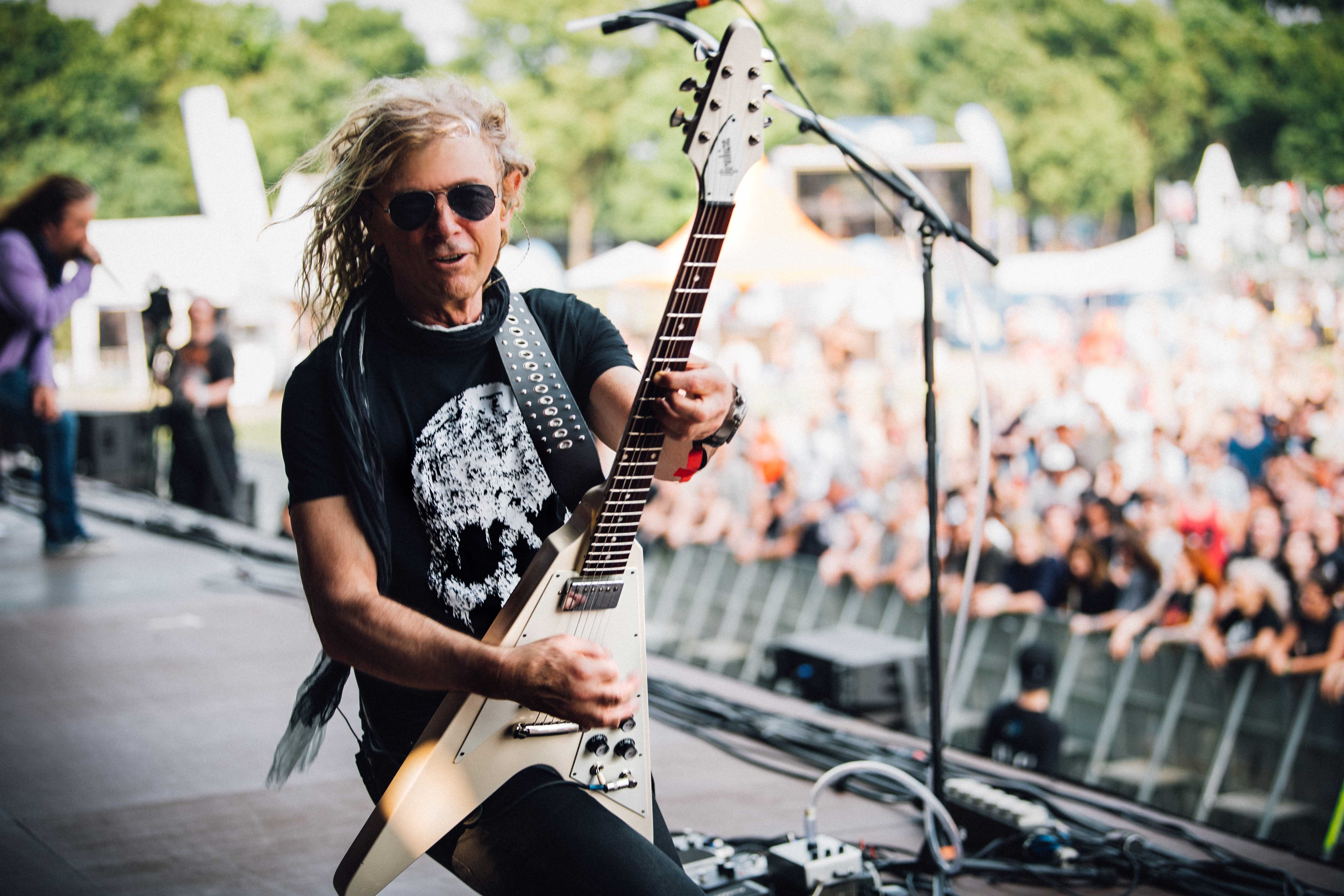
- Lowy in 2017
- Born: 1954 (age 71–72); Sydney, Australia
- Education: University of New South Wales BComm
- Parents: Frank Lowy AC (father); Shirley Lowy OAM (mother)
- Relatives: Steven Lowy (brother)
- Musical career
- Genre: Hard rock
- Occupation: Guitarist
- Years active: 2003–present
- Member of: The Dead Daisies
- Formerly of: Doc Neeson’s Angels; Red Phoenix; Mink

David Hillel Lowy AM (born 1954) is an Australian businessman, aviator and musician. He is the eldest son of Westfield Corporation co-founder Frank Lowy and a principal of Lowy Family Group (LFG), the Family Office and private investment group of the Lowy family. He holds a Bachelor of Commerce from the University of New South Wales. He is known for being a member of the band The Dead Daisies.

== Business ==
Prior to the founding of LFG, David Lowy worked for the Westfield Group from 1977 to 2000 in positions including Executive Director (1981 to 1987) and Managing Director (1987 to 2000). Lowy continued to serve Westfield as non-executive Deputy Chairman until his retirement from the Westfield Board in 2011. In 2000, he led the establishment of the Lowy family’s private investment entity, Lowy Family Group (LFG) and as a Principal continues to manage its international investment operations. LFG has offices in Sydney and New York. David is also a Director of the Lowy Institute for International Policy and the Lowy Medical Research Institute.

== Aviation ==
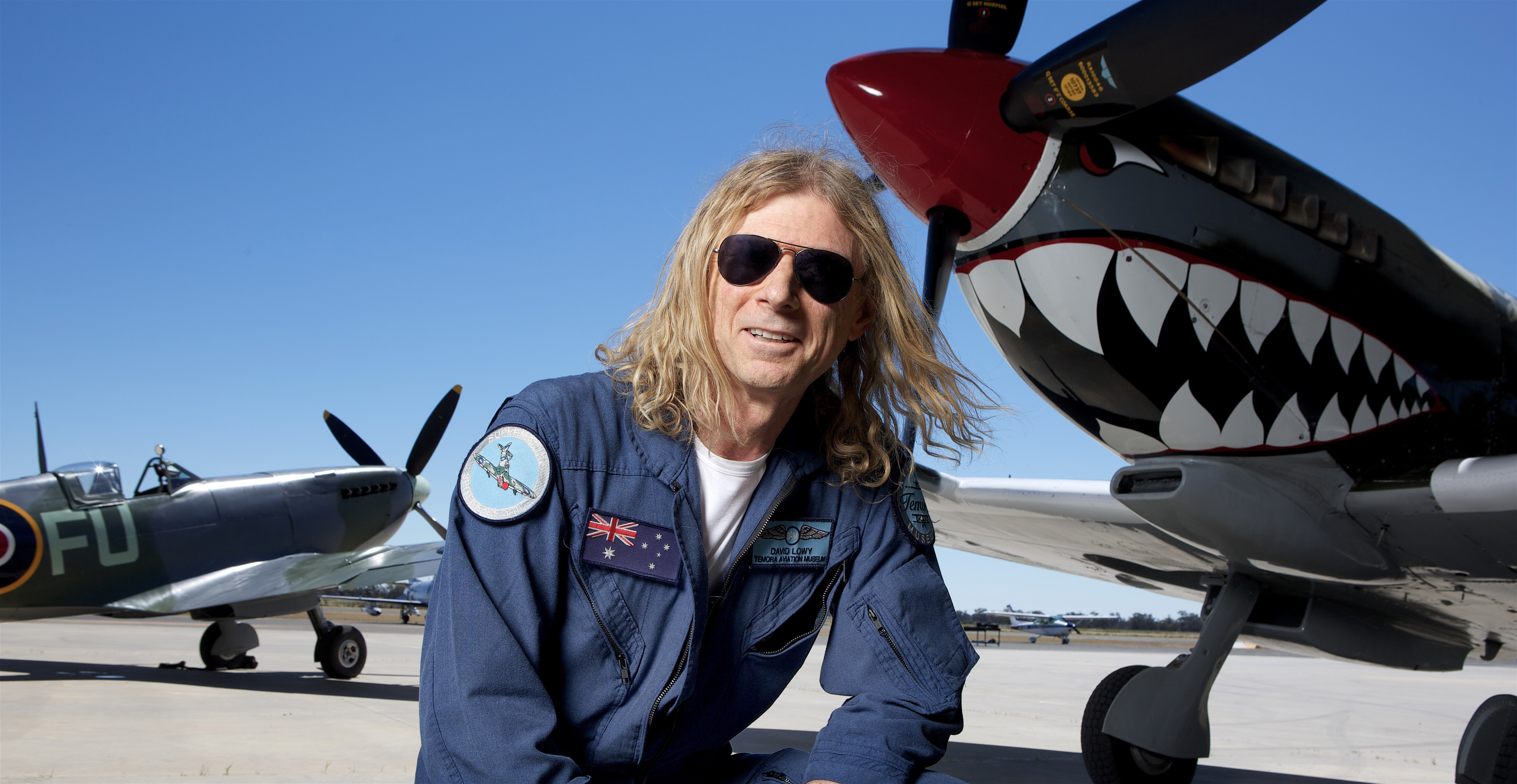

Lowy is the President and Founder of Temora Aviation Museum. (TAM) housed at the former site of the largest Royal Australian Air Force (RAAF) World War II training field in New South Wales, Australia. In 2003, Lowy was named a Member of the Order of Australia for his service to aviation, particularly the preservation and promotion of Australia’s aviation history through the establishment of the Temora Aviation Museum. In 2006 he received the Guild of Air Pilots and Air Navigators’ Australian Bicentennial Award, which recognises outstanding individuation contribution to Australian aviation. He became a Special Capabilities Officer in the RAAF Reserves (rank of Flight Lieutenant) in 2019.

Lowy is a former Australian Aerobatic Champion (Unlimited Division, 1998) and was selected to represent Australia at the World Aerobatic Championships in Trenčín, Slovakia in 1998; however he was unable to attend due to business commitments. Lowy has performed at airshows flying a WWII Spitfire as well as Vietnam War-era A37B Dragonfly ground attack jet. He was trained in aerobatics by the late Alan Hannah, who was a former RAAF F/A-18 Hornet and Caribou pilot.

Lowy also holds an FAA Airline Transport Pilot Licence (ATP) and pilots a Gulfstream 650 business jet. He began flying in 1985 after a ride in a British Aerospace Hawk inspired him to start his flying career. His interest in aviation began at age 5 after his mother gave him a balsa wood glider.

== Music ==
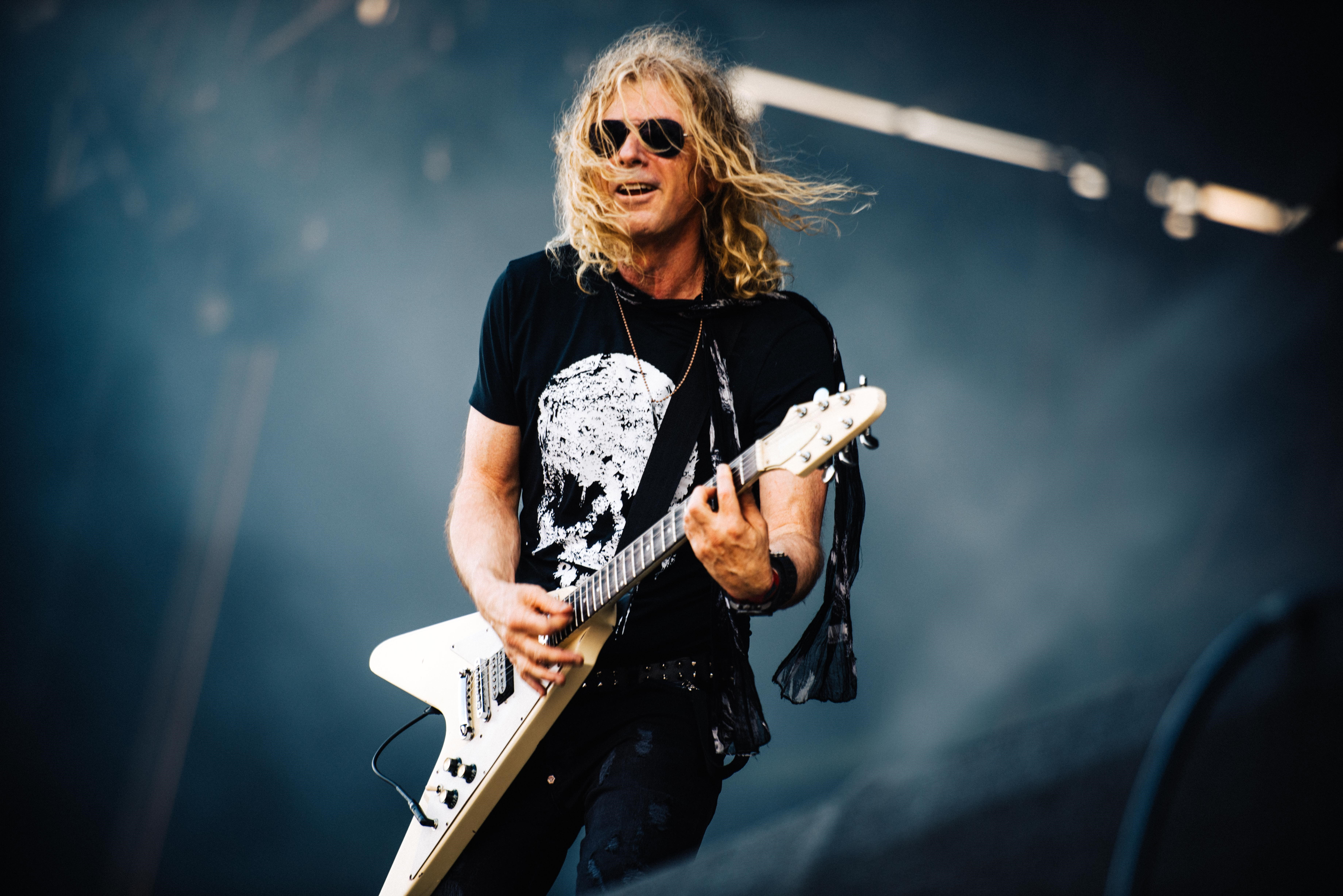
David Lowy (photographed by Oliver Halfin) performing with The Dead Daisies

Lowy is the founder of The Dead Daisies, a musical collective created by a rotating line-up that has featured numerous famous rock musicians. Since their inception in 2012, The Dead Daisies have released ten albums to date and touring alongside rock acts including: ZZ Top, Aerosmith, Lynyrd Skynyrd, Bad Company, Judas Priest, Kiss, Whitesnake, Def Leppard and the Hollywood Vampires. As of 2023 members include vocalist John Corabi, lead guitarist Doug Aldrich, drummer Tommy Clufetos, bassist Michael Devin, and David Lowy rhythm guitarist.

Before the founding of The Dead Daisies, Lowy has also played with Doc Neeson’s Angels (2003-2005) and written and recorded with the bands Red Phoenix (2005) and Mink (2006-2008).
