= Human Nature (Hardline album) =

Studio album by Hardline
- Released: October 14, 2016 (International edition); October 5, 2016 (Japanese edition)
- Recorded: 2015–2016
- Venues: Italy; United States
- Studios: Ivorytears Music Works, Somma Lombardo; The Box, CT
- Genre: Hard rock
- Length: 53:15 (International edition); 58:24 (Japanese edition)
- Labels: Frontiers (International edition); Avalon (Japanese edition)
- Producer: Alessandro Del Vecchio

Hardline chronology
Danger Zone (2012)	Human Nature (2016)	Life (2019)

Singles from Human Nature
- 1. "Where Will We Go From Here" Released: August 22, 2016; 2. "In The Dead Of The Night" Released: September 26, 2016; 3. "Take You Home" Released: October 3, 2016

Human Nature is the fifth album by American rock group Hardline with the modern line up featuring keyboardist Alessandro Del Vecchio, bassist Anna Portalupi, Francesco Jovino on drums and returning guitarist Josh Ramos with lead singer Johnny Gioeli. Originally it was announced during 2015 through a Facebook Video on their fan page from Johnny Gioeli and was originally titled Hardline 5, where they would be recording new songs "throughout the summer". It is the first Hardline album to feature returning guitarist Josh Ramos (who had returned to the band during their 2013 Danger Zone tour) replacing stand in guitarist Thorsten Koehne who previously played on Danger Zone. Ramos has not been featured on a Hardline record since 2009's Leaving the End Open.

During the making of the new Hardline record, lead singer Johnny Gioeli announced he was working on his first ever solo album called One Voice, where fans could support the album through the crowdfunding site Pledgemusic. During this time the new Hardline album title was announced to be called Human Nature.

On August 22, 2016, their label Frontiers Records released the new music video Where Will We Go from Here. On September 26 In The Dead Of The Night was revealed. A new track Take You Home was revealed as a music video by Gioeli and released on the Frontiers YouTube page a few months later on October 3, 2016. which would later on be revealed as Gioeli's personal favourite song on the album. The new CD was released on October 14, 2016. Gioeli likes to compare Human Nature to the sound of their first release, Double Eclipse, but with a fresh new twist.

== Tour ==
Hardline toured the new album starting from May 21, 2017, starting in Italy. During their May 23, 2017 show at The Robin 2, in Wolverhampton, England, they dedicated the song "Human Nature" to the victims of the Manchester Arena bombing which occurred a day before. They also celebrated the 25th anniversary of their debut album Double Eclipse by naming their new tour "Double Eclipse 25th Anniversary Tour" which also featured a mixture of new tracks from the new album Human Nature and a heavily focused set of songs from Double Eclipse. The next leg of the Human Nature tour was held through Germany and Switzerland during December 2017.

== Track listing ==
All songs written by Alessandro Del Vecchio and Johnny Gioeli.

No.	Title	Length
1.	"Where Will We Go from Here"	4:31
2.	"Nobody's Fool"	4:13
3.	"Human Nature"	4:14
4.	"Trapped in Muddy Waters"	5:20
5.	"Running on Empty"	4:08
6.	"The World Is Falling Down"	4:02
7.	"Take You Home"	4:19
8.	"Where the North Wind Blows"	4:29
9.	"In the Dead of Night"	5:28
10.	"United We Stand"	3:22
11.	"Fighting the Battle"	5:09
Total length:		53:15

Japanese edition bonus track
No.	Title	Length
12.	"Take You Home" (orchestral version)	5:09

== Personnel ==
- Johnny Gioeli - Vocals
- Alessandro Del Vecchio - Keyboards, backing vocals, producing, recording, mixing, mastering
- Anna Portalupi - Bass Guitar
- Josh Ramos - Guitars
- Francesco Jovino - Drums

=== Additional personnel ===
- Serafino Perugino - executive producer
- Stan-W D - artwork
- Riccardo Bernardi - photography
