= Sorry We're Late But We're Worth the Wait =

Sorry We're Late But We're Worth The Wait

Studio album by Magic Eight Ball
- Released: 8 November 2013; Re-released 13 April 2016
- Recorded: 2012–2013
- Genres: Rock, power pop
- Length: 1:07:15
- Label: Magic Cat Records
- Producer: Donnie Vie

Magic Eight Ball chronology
Mother Nature's Candy (2011)	Sorry We're Late But We're Worth The Wait (2013)	Last Of The Old Romantics (2014)

Singles from "Sorry We're Late But We're Worth The Wait"
- 1. "Russian Ballet (Русский балет)" Released: 2013; 2. "Monkey Bars" Released: 2014

Sorry We're Late But We're Worth The Wait is the debut studio album by the power pop band Magic Eight Ball. The songs "Monkey Bars" and "Russian Ballet" were released as singles.

== Background ==
The songs on Magic Eight Ball's debut album span a larger period of time than their subsequent releases. The earliest are "Before It Was Murder" and "Local Girls", which date back to 1999 in their earliest forms, whereas songs like "Russian Ballet", "Monkey Bars" and "Something Better Has Come Along" were mostly written in the year or so prior to the studio recordings for the album. Between 2007 and 2011, half of the songs on Sorry We're Late... were also recorded in their original versions for the band's first two EPs, A Peacock's Tale and Mother Nature's Candy. During that time, the band's frontman Baz Francis began working with Dave Draper as producer. Before recording was concluded, Francis went on the road in Europe with Donnie Vie on The Magical History Tour, and Vie contributed to the song "Before It Was Murder (You Got Me Talking)".

The album's name was coined by Francis:

After all those years of working on my songs, recording in various ways with different people, I was so proud in what we had all created here, and it just felt very apt and ridiculously pompous in a good way to call the record 'Sorry We're Late But We're Worth The Wait'

— Baz Francis

The album was re-released on iTunes on 13 April 2016.

== Track listing ==
All songs written by Baz Francis.

No.	Title	Length
1.	"Something Better Has Come Along"	3:25
2.	"Sunday Mornings"	2:27
3.	"Baby, Is It So?"	4:51
4.	"Big Star"	2:23
5.	"Never Need New Genes"	3:11
6.	"Monkey Bars"	3:14
7.	"Russian Ballet (Русский балет)"	3:30
8.	"Love Makes You Do Some Funny Things"	2:35
9.	"Before It Was Murder (You Got Me Talking) (ft. Donnie Vie)"	6:15
10.	"Local Girls"	5:53

Digital Download Bonus Tracks
No.	Title	Length
11.	"Monkey Bars (Acoustic Session)"	3:13
12.	"Russian Ballet (Русский балет) (Acoustic Session)"	3:43
13.	"Local Girls (Acoustic Live)"	5:45
14.	"Never Need New Genes (Acoustic Radio Session)"	3:28
15.	"Down By The River"	2:51
16.	"Disco Elementary"	1:28
17.	"Perils Of Honesty"	0:58
18.	"Rhubarb & Custard (Cats In My Home)"	2:50
19.	"L. N. E. (For The Love Of Three Girls) (Alternate Version)"	2:01
20.	"Rose-Tinted Eyes"	3:14

2016 iTunes Expanded Edition Bonus Tracks
No.	Title	Length
11.	"Monkey Bars (Acoustic Session)"
12.	"Russian Ballet (Русский балет) (Acoustic Session)"
13.	"Local Girls (Acoustic Live)"
14.	"Down By The River"
15.	"Disco Elementary"
16.	"Perils Of Honesty"
17.	"Rhubarb & Custard (Cats In My Home)"
18.	"Rose-Tinted Eyes"
19.	"Peacocks"

== Personnel ==
=== Musicians ===
- Baz Francis – Vocals, guitar, bass & other flourishes
- Jason Bowld – Drums

=== Additional musicians ===
- Robbie J. Holland – Backing vocals on "Sunday Mornings" and hand claps on "Big Star"
- Donnie Vie – Additional vocals on "Before It Was Murder (You Got Me Talking)"
- Kay Dougan – Handclaps on "Before It Was Murder (You Got Me Talking)"
- Oly Edkins – Handclaps on "Before It Was Murder (You Got Me Talking)"
- Dave Draper – Additional electric guitar on "Never Need New Genes"
- Matthew Colley – Piano on ‘Monkey Bars’
- Introductory hijinks on "Something Better Has Come Along" by Baz Francis, Robbie J. Holland, Kay Dougan & Oly Edkins

=== Production ===
- Dave Draper – Recording, mixing and mastering
- Donnie Vie – Executive Producer
- Sean Rea – Additional backing vocal arrangement on "Local Girls"
- Jack Jones – Original demo production for "Local Girls" and "Before It Was Murder (You Got Me Talking)"

=== Art direction ===
- Kay Dougan – All illustrations & Photo editing
- Tariq Hussain – Artwork layout
- Baz Francis – Original design concept
- Angel Dean Brown – Band photography & Photo editing
- Maryhèléna Francis – Centerfold calligraphy
