= Double Eclipse =

Studio album by Hardline
- Released: April 28, 1992
- Studios: A&M, Hollywood; NRG, Hollywood
- Genres: Hard rock, heavy metal
- Length: 54:10
- Label: MCA
- Producer: Neal Schon

Hardline chronology
Double Eclipse (1992)	II (2002)

Singles from Double Eclipse
- 1. "Takin' Me Down" Released: 1992; 2. "Hot Cherie" Released: 1992

Professional ratings
Review scores
Source	Rating
AllMusic	2.5/5 stars
Raw	3.5/5 stars
Rock Hard	8.5/10

Double Eclipse is the debut album by the American hard rock band Hardline, released in 1992.

The first single released from the album was "Takin' Me Down", written by Johnny and Joey Gioeli with Neal Schon. "Takin' Me Down" peaked at No. 37 on the Billboard Mainstream Rock Tracks chart in June 1992. The album's second single, a cover of a Mainstream Rock Tracks chart hit by Danny Spanos from 1983 and written by members of the band Streetheart, "Hot Cherie" rose to No. 25 on the Mainstream Rock Tracks chart in the fall of 1992.

The album has been described as heavy metal and hard rock. AllMusic praised the rockers such as "Hot Cherie" but panned the "wretched" ballads.

== Background ==
Journey guitarist Neal Schon joined the Gioeli brothers and toured for this album, which rocks a bit harder than most of his Journey and Bad English tracks had and features little synthesizer (even though it features two tracks co-written with the aforementioned bands' keyboardist, Jonathan Cain), but Schon departed for other projects after the band lost its record deal. Schon was replaced by former Storm guitarist Josh Ramos.

Hardline's 2002 album, II, and 2012 album, Danger Zone, each depict an eclipse as part of its cover artwork, an homage to Double Eclipse's ten-year and twenty-year anniversaries.

== In popular culture ==
The song "Can't Find My Way" (in its demo form) is featured during the montage love scene in the 1992 Brandon Lee action movie Rapid Fire. The song "I'll Be There" is played during the film's closing credits. The song "Hot Cherie" is used in episode 7 of Peacemaker season 1.

== Track listing ==
All tracks are written by Neal Schon, Johnny Gioeli, Joey Gioeli, except where noted.

No.	Title	Writer(s)	Length
1.	"Life's a Bitch"		4:22
2.	"Dr. Love"	Mark Baker, Brian Connors, Mike Slamer	5:31
3.	"Rhythm from a Red Car"		3:40
4.	"Change of Heart"		4:42
5.	"Everything"	Schon, Johnny Gioeli, Joey Gioeli, Eddie Money, Jonathan Cain, Tony Marty, Mark Tanner	3:55
6.	"Takin' Me Down"		3:34
7.	"Hot Cherie" (originally performed by Streetheart (band) then Danny Spanos)	Randy Bishop, Daryl Gutheil, Jeffrey Neill, Kenneth Shields, Ken Sinnaeve	4:47
8.	"Bad Taste"		4:23
9.	"Can't Find My Way"		5:28
10.	"I'll Be There"	Schon, Johnny Gioeli, Joey Gioeli, Cain	4:36
11.	"31-91"	Schon	1:32
12.	"In the Hands of Time"		6:18
Total length:			52:41

Japanese edition only album bonus track
No.	Title	Length
3.	"Love Leads the Way"	4:04
Total length:		56:45

== Personnel ==
Band members

- Johnny Gioeli – lead vocals, acoustic guitar, rhythm guitar, percussion
- Neal Schon – lead guitar, rhythm guitar, classical guitar, guitar synthesizer, backing vocals, producer, arrangement
- Joey Gioeli – rhythm guitar, backing vocals
- Todd Jensen – bass, backing vocals
- Deen Castronovo – drums, backing vocals

Production

- Tony Phillips – engineer, mixing
- John Aguto, Lee Manning, Mike Stock, Randy Wine – assistant engineers
- Bob Ludwig – mastering at Masterdisk, New York

== Charts ==
=== Weekly charts ===
Chart (1992)	Peak position
Japan (Oricon)	49
US AOR Albums (Radio & Records)	18
