= Magic Eight Ball (band) =

Power pop band

Background information
- Origin: Old Windsor, England
- Genres: Rock, power pop
- Years active: 2004–present
- Label: Magic Cat Records
- Members: Baz Francis; Robbie J. Holland; PD Doling
- Past members: Mike Corbyn; Diana Trochim; David Novan; Michael Gates; Sam Browne; Chris West; Ryan Peacher; Simon Freedman; Jack Jones; Andy Copper; Sean Rea; Kate Wilkinson

Magic Eight Ball is a power pop band formed in Old Windsor, England. They are now based in Egham, England.

== History ==
=== Early years (2004–2010) ===
The first incarnation of the band came together under the name Cartoon Monsters in 2004. A week later, they took up the name Magic Eight Ball. The band initially began performing live as a duo in 2005, then as a trio from 2006. During these years Magic Eight Ball experienced several lineup changes. In May 2007, their debut EP 'A Peacock's Tale' was independently released.

In early 2009 Magic Eight Ball are asked to record a cover of Depeche Mode's classic ‘Stripped’ for a website venture, and the band decides to release it as the A-Side to a new 2-song single featuring DJ Rex recording additional whispers for the lead track.

=== Sorry We're Late But We're Worth The Wait (2010–2013) ===
Having formed their own music label, Magic Cat Records, Magic Eight Ball then release their second EP in June 2011, the 5-track ‘Mother Nature's Candy'. Jody Stephens of seminal US-band Big Star then expresses his enjoyment of the song named in his band’s honour.

Magic Eight Ball and Baz Francis were selected as opening acts for Donnie Vie's inaugural UK Tour (Magic Eight Ball performing the first 4 shows, and Francis performing the final 3 solo in support of the singer.)

On 24 April 2012 Magic Cat Records released a remixed and remastered version of Magic Eight Ball’s 2007 debut EP, 'A Peacock's Tale'. The next month would see Magic Eight Ball going on a national tour in May 2012, followed by Magic Cat Records re-releasing their 2009 ‘Stripped’ single in June. In October of the same year the band began work on what would become their debut album. The 'Russian Ballet' single was released digitally on 22 October 2013, accompanied by the Emil Kunda-directed video that was filmed in London in the March of that year.

Through Magic Cat Records, Magic Eight Ball released their first album Sorry We're Late But We're Worth The Wait, featuring guest appearances from Jason Bowld (Bullet for My Valentine) and Donnie Vie on 22 November 2013. They launched their new album by supporting Spunge at the O2 Academy2 in London on 15 November 2013

=== Last Of The Old Romantics (2014–present) ===
On 27 January 2014, Baz Francis and Dave Draper began work on the second Magic Eight Ball album, whilst Baz also simultaneously worked on other projects. Later the recording of the new Magic Eight Ball album took an exciting turn with the narration of Baz’s poetry for the disc by comic legend, Rik Mayall in London on 7 May 2014. On 10 July the digital single "Monkey Bars", accompanied by an Oly Edkins-directed video and the exclusive b-side "Rose-Tinted Eyes" was released for a limited time.

Magic Eight Ball began a European tour on 11 July 2014 and played Belgium, Luxembourg and The Netherlands for the first time. They then returned to England to play on the Main Stage at Weyfest in Surrey on 30 August 2014 on the same bill as Glen Matlock of the Sex Pistols and Ian Anderson of Jethro Tull (amongst others).

After many months of work in the studio, Magic Eight Ball finally concluded the recording of their second album and Christmas single. In September they filmed a video for new song "Come Get Your Kicks" with fetish artist Zara DuRose and film-maker Oly Edkins in West Drayton, London. The video premiered on YouTube on 28 October 2014. 6 November saw the band shoot another video for their Christmas single at Brigidine School in Windsor with Oly Edkins, combining a live performance with all the staff and students.

After completing a year’s worth of recording for their sophomore effort, Magic Eight Ball officially released their collaboration with Rik Mayall and their second album, Last Of The Old Romantics both on CD and also for download with bonus tracks on 10 November 2014.

On 1 December 2014, Magic Eight Ball released their stand-alone two-song Christmas single "I Just Love You More At Christmas". On the same day, Cargo Records released Donnie’s Vie’s double-record, The White Album, featuring vocals from Baz Francis on the tracks "For Your Pleasure" and "Unforsaken".

Following mixing work done to a session recorded by Rachel Newton-John on 17 December the previous year, on 27 January 2015, Magic Eight Ball digitally released their stand-alone single track "Better Off Asleep".

In March, the band then embarked on another series of European live shows in Germany, France and Luxembourg as part of ‘The Last Of The Old Romantics - Dirty Weekends Around Europe’. Following a couple more dates back in England, the band concluded their first headlining tour in the summer with a run of dates in Wales.

Since then Baz Francis joined Donnie Vie on his White Album tour, and together with Rachel Newton-John the trio formed the band V8. After releasing a live EP, V8 Live In Europe 2015 and the single Mrs Vandevelde with V8, Francis and Magic Eight Ball have returned to the studio to record their 3rd album with Dave Draper.

== Discography ==
=== Studio albums ===
- Sorry We're Late But We're Worth The Wait (2013)
- Last Of The Old Romantics (2014)
- Richest Men In The Graveyard (2016)

=== EPs ===
- A Peacock's Tale (2007/2012)
- Mother Nature's Candy (2011)

=== Singles ===
- "Stripped" (2009/2012)
- "Russian Ballet" (2013)
- "Monkey Bars" (2014)
- "I Just Love You More at Christmas" (2014)
- "Better Off Asleep" (2015)
