= Last of the Old Romantics =

Last Of The Old Romantics

Studio album by Magic Eight Ball
- Released: 16 December 2014
- Recorded: 2014
- Studios: Tower Studios, Pershore & Resident Studios, London
- Genres: Rock, power pop
- Length: 51:38
- Label: Magic Cat Records
- Producers: Dave Draper & Baz Francis

Magic Eight Ball chronology
Sorry We're Late But We're Worth The Wait (2013)	Last Of The Old Romantics (2014)	Richest Men in the Graveyard (2016)

Last Of The Old Romantics is the second full-length album released by Magic Eight Ball.

== Background ==
Writing for Last Of The Old Romantics began while Magic Eight Ball's debut album "Sorry We're Late But We're Worth The Wait" was being recorded. Frontman Baz Francis and producer Dave Draper had established a working relationship during the creation of their first album. This encouraged the band to go back into the studio only three months after the first album was released to start working on their sophomore effort. Songs were already written, but deliberately left off 'Sorry We're Late...' as they felt the songs would fit better on their next release. Baz Francis believed the new material written at that point seemed like love letters from relationships past and present. He expanded upon that theme and chose to make the whole album just that; a journal of his romantic endeavors, both flawed and joyous. The idea of the album title, and the artwork concept stemmed from a heated argument over animal rights in which he loved the romance of the hunter becoming the hunted.

After former Enuff Z'Nuff front man Donnie Vie performed on the first record, the band felt they should continue to aim high when it came to the musical guest on their follow up. Bassist Robbie J. Holland and Baz compiled a list of possible contributors to 'Last Of The Old Romantics'.

We aimed really high and never in a million years thought we'd realistically get our Number One choice of narrator for the album, but we did the day Rik Mayall's agent gave us the green light. Little did any of us know that he'd pass away a month after his session with us and we'd be left with one of his final recordings on our album. The album then became bigger than all of us, and for the most personal music I'd ever worked on to have this additional significance to it too now was so scary and intensely poignant. Everything about the album was done to extremes, whether it be the provocative artwork which initially drew some complaints for being misinterpreted as pro-cruelty (something that I fought to defend, as it is the opposite) or the 'Come Get Your Kicks' video where I got beaten on for real by a dominatrix (to mock misogynistic music videos elsewhere). Personally, that record really was a case of me literally shedding blood, sweat and tears for my art. The pay-off was huge though, I believe.

— Baz Francis

== Track listing ==
All tracks are written by Baz Francis.

No.	Title	Length
1.	"See You Next Tuesday" (featuring Rik Mayall)	3:05
2.	"What Happened In '92"	2:33
3.	"Come Get Your Kicks"	3:04
4.	"Yeah, I'm Serious"	3:10
5.	"California In The Fall"	2:52
6.	"Wait Here A Second" (featuring Rik Mayall)	4:40
7.	"Losing My Faith In Human Nature"	3:08
8.	"Red Hair Wrapped Around Her Neck"	5:00
9.	"Good For Nothing Good"	3:36
10.	"On The Days That You Wish You Could End It All.." (featuring Rik Mayall)	2:54

Digital Download Bonus Tracks
No.	Title	Length
11.	"Red Hair Wrapped Around Her Neck" (Demo)	4:38
12.	"Good For Nothing Good" (Demo)	3:40
13.	"See You Next Tuesday" (Acoustic Live)	1:59
14.	"I Just Love You More At Christmas"	2:24
15.	"As My Heart Sinks"	2:18
16.	"Better Off Asleep"	2:37

2016 iTunes Expanded Edition Bonus Tracks
No.	Title	Length
11.	"Red Hair Wrapped Around Her Neck" (Demo)	4:38
12.	"Good For Nothing Good" (Demo)	3:40
13.	"On The Days You Wish You Could End It All..." (Acoustic Session)	2:59
14.	"I Just Love You More At Christmas"	2:18
15.	"As My Heart Sinks"	2:18
16.	"Better Off Asleep"	2:37

== Personnel ==
=== Musicians ===
- Baz Francis – Vocals, guitars, bass & keys
- Jason Bowld – Drums

=== Additional performers ===
- Rik Mayall – Introductions to tracks 1 & 6, Closing outro on track 10.
- Dave Draper – Additional outro guitar on ‘Losing My Faith In Human Nature’
- Hugh Thomas – Saxophone on ‘What Happened In ’92’ Rik Mayall: Very Special Master of Ceremonies
- Hugh Thomas – Additional brass arrangement on ‘What Happened In ’92’
- Jason Bowld – Additional backing vocal arrangement on ‘California In The Fall’

=== Production ===
- Dave Draper – Mixing & Mastering
- Dave Draper and Baz Francis – Programming
- Dave Draper and Baz Francis – Production

=== Art direction ===
- Kay Dougan – Live band photography
- Baz Francis – Original design concept
- Tariq Hussain – Artwork layout
- Stuart Anderson – Studio photo
- Kay Dougan – All illustrations
- Dave Draper – Photo editing
