= Live at the Gods Festival 2002 =

2003 live album by Hardline

Live album by Hardline
- Released: November 10, 2003
- Recorded: June 2, 2002
- Venue: Gods Festival in Bradford, England
- Genre: Hard rock
- Length: 75:03
- Label: Frontiers

Hardline chronology
II (2002)	Live at the Gods Festival 2002 (2003)	Leaving the End Open (2009)

Live at the Gods Festival 2002

Video by Hardline
- Released: November 10, 2003
- Genre: Hard rock
- Length: ≈ 80 min.
- Label: Frontiers
- Producer: Claire Swan, Simon Bennett

Live at the Gods Festival 2002 is a live album by Hardline, released on DVD and CD in 2003. It was recorded at the Gods Festival in Bradford, England on June 2, 2002, where Hardline was the headliner.

The CD version contains 3 bonus tracks, originally written for their second album, II. However, the bonus tracks were included without lead vocalist Johnny Gioeli's approval or knowledge. The DVD features the entire concert with no bonus footage; however, there is a slide show containing photos taken at the concert at the end after the credits, while the unreleased track "Hypnotized", which was originally written for II, plays in the background.

== Background ==
The Gods Festival was an all-day festival featuring eight other bands, including Jeff Scott Soto, who marked his first live performance as a solo artist, and Harem Scarem (Then known as "Rubber"). Hardline was the last band to play at 2 a.m. During the first couple of songs in the show, the band was suffering from technical and sound problems on stage. The microphones and equipment were worn out after being on all day. This affected the backup singers' microphones the most, causing them to not hear their own voices over the other music. Furthermore, lead vocalist Johnny Gioeli was recovering from a throat infection at the time, although his voice still sounded quite powerful on stage. While performing the ballad "Face the Night", Gioeli stormed off of the stage angerly to talk to the tech staff to fix the microphones, but then kept his cool as he came back on stage to perform the rest of the show. Three backup singers were used–two female, one male–at the concert. The female backup singers, Gudi Laos and Katja Kutz, also toured with Gioeli's other band, Axel Rudi Pell, on their 2002 Shadow Zone tour. The lineup for the band is the same as their second album, II, with the exception of bass player Christopher Maloney, who was busy promoting his first solo album. Maloney was replaced by producer Bob Burch.

Gioeli revealed in a 2002 interview regarding II that he had attempted to get the original Hardline lineup back together for both the new album and the Gods Festival, "Deen was contacted first and although he was interested in doing it he was petrified that Neal would be angry if he did it. I contacted Neal directly and he was all in favor of doing solos on the record based on him liking the songs. I said, 'Play on what you like and the fans will love it.' I had no way of knowing how to get in touch with Todd. I think he was back on the road with David Lee Roth. I just recently got word back from our keyboard player Michael that Todd would have been interested doing the record. It's a real kick in the ass but hey he couldn't have anyway being on the road. I almost had the whole band back. I tried for the Hardline fans."

== Track listing ==
1. "Intro" – 0:16
2. "Hot Cherie" – 6:15
3. "Life's a Bitch" – 4:33
4. "Everything" – 4:14
5. "Face the Night" – 4:30
6. "Takin' Me Down" – 4:00
7. "Weight" – 3:27
8. "In the Hands of Time" – 8:04
9. "Only a Night" – 4:10
10. "I'll Be There" – 4:00
11. "Drum Solo" – 4:13
12. "Rhythm from a Red Car" – 5:24
13. "Keyboards Solo" – 3:00
14. "Dr. Love" – 6:53

=== CD version bonus tracks ===
1. "Hypnotized" – 4:30
2. "Only a Night" (Acoustic) – 3:46
3. "Mercy" – 3:48

== Personnel ==
- Johnny Gioeli – vocals
- Josh Ramos – lead guitar
- Joey Gioeli – rhythm guitars
- Michael T. Ross – keyboards
- Bob Burch – bass guitar
- Bobby Rock – drums
