= Magic Eight Ball =

Magic Eight Ball may refer to:

- Magic 8 Ball, a toy
- Magic Eight Ball (band), a British band
