= Wrapped Around My Middle Finger =

Studio album by Donnie Vie
- Released: 2012
- Genre: Power pop, rock
- Label: Livewire/Cargo

Donnie Vie chronology
Extra Strength (2007)	Wrapped Around My Middle Finger (2012)	Goodbye: Enough Z'Nuff (2014)

Wrapped Around My Middle Finger is the second studio album released by Donnie Vie.

== Track listing ==
1. "Wrapped Around My Middle Finger"
2. "Wunderland"
3. "Lisa"
4. "Daddy’s Girl"
5. "Now Ya Know"
6. "No Escape"
7. "Lil’ Wonder"
8. "Flames Of Love"
9. "Rattle On"
10. "I Won’t Let You Down"
11. "Smokin’ Hot Lollipop"
