= One Voice (Johnny Gioeli album) =

Studio album by Johnny Gioeli
- Released: December 7, 2018 (International edition); November 28, 2018 (Japanese edition)
- Studio: Ivorytears Music Works, Somma Lombardo, Italy; The Box Studios, Connecticut, US; Bridge Night Studios, Pittsburgh, Pennsylvania, US
- Genre: Hard rock
- Length: 42:27 (International edition); 46:57 (Japanese edition)
- Label: Frontiers (International edition); Nexus and Seven Seas (Japanese edition)
- Producer: Alessandro Del Vecchio

Singles from One Voice
- 1. "Drive" Released: October 3, 2018; 2. "One Voice" Released: January 7, 2019

One Voice is the debut solo album by American hard rock singer Johnny Gioeli (Hardline, Axel Rudi Pell, Crush 40). It was released on December 7, 2018 via Neapolitan label Frontiers Records and it was produced by Italian multi-instrumentalist Alessandro Del Vecchio (Edge of Forever, Hardline, Silent Force, Jorn), also on keyboards. The entire album was written by Johnny Gioeli and guitarist Eric Gadrix. The band was completed by Italian musicians Nik Marzucconi (Edge of Forever, Labyrinth, Sunstorm) on bass and Marco Di Salvia (Edge of Forever, Hardline, Pino Scotto, Kee of Hearts).

The album was preceded by the single "Drive" on October 3, 2018.

== Track listing ==
All songs written by Johnny Gioeli and Eric Gadrix.

No.	Title	Length
1.	"Drive"	3:46
2.	"It"	3:45
3.	"One Voice"	4:23
4.	"Mind Melt"	3:36
5.	"Running"	3:40
6.	"Deeper"	3:02
7.	"Let Me Know"	3:09
8.	"Hit Me Once, Hit Ya Twice"	3:38
9.	"Price We Pay"	4:53
10.	"Out Of Here"	3:51
11.	"Oh Fathers"	4:44

Japanese edition bonus track
No.	Title	Length
12.	"Price We Pay" (acoustic version)	4:30

== Personnel ==
- Johnny Gioeli - vocals
- Eric Gadrix - guitars
- Alessandro Del Vecchio - keyboards, organ, producing, recording, mixing, mastering
- Nik Mazzucconi - bass guitar
- Marco Di Salvia - drums

=== Additional personnel ===
- Mark @ ASYLUMseventy7 - Artwork, Layout
- Ash Inhester, Bjorn Carlsson, Tommaso Barletta - photography
