= Better Off Asleep =

Single by Magic Eight Ball
- Released: January 27, 2015
- Recorded: December 17, 2014 at Burnham Mews
- Genre: Power pop, rock
- Length: 2:37
- Label: Magic Cat Records
- Songwriter(s): Baz Francis

Magic Eight Ball singles chronology
"I Just Love You More at Christmas" (2014)	"Better Off Asleep" (2015)

"Better Off Asleep" is a standalone single released by the band Magic Eight Ball.

== Track listing ==
All tracks are written by Baz Francis

No.	Title	Length
1.	"Better Off Asleep"	2:37

== Personnel ==
=== Musicians ===
- Baz Francis - Vocals, acoustic guitar and kazoo

=== Production ===
- Lewis John - Recording, engineering, mixing and mastering
- Baz Francis - Producing
- Phil John - Producing

=== Art direction ===
- Andrea Duarte - Cover photography
