= The Best of Donnie Vie =

Greatest hits album by Donnie Vie
- Released: 2015
- Genre: Rock, Power Pop,

Donnie Vie chronology
The White Album (2014)	The Best of Donnie Vie (2015)	! (2016)

The Best of Donnie Vie is a digital-only compilation album of Donnie Vie's solo material.

== Track listing ==
1. Spider Web
2. Forever
3. I'll Go On
4. That's What Love Is
5. Wasting Time
6. Wrapped Around My Middle Finger
7. Wunderland
8. Now Ya Know
9. Flames of Love
10. I Won't Let You Down
11. For Your Pleasure
12. Light Shine On
13. Better Love Next Time
14. My Love
15. Unforsaken
16. You're My Favorite Thing to Do
17. Almost Home
18. Victory (Demo)
19. Habit (Live)
20. My Dear Dream (UK Session)
21. Time to Let You Go (UK Session)
