= I Just Love You More at Christmas =

Single by Magic Eight Ball
- Released: December 1, 2014
- Recorded: 2014, Tower Studios
- Genre: Power pop, rock
- Length: 4:44
- Label: Magic Cat Records
- Songwriter(s): Baz Francis

Magic Eight Ball singles chronology
| "Monkey Bars" (2014) | "I Just Love You More at Christmas" (2014) | "Better Off Asleep" (2015) |

"I Just Love You More at Christmas" is a single released by the band Magic Eight Ball.

== Music video ==
A music video was shot on November 6, 2014, for their Christmas single at Brigidine School in Windsor with Oly Edkins, combining a live performance for all the staff and students in the process.

== Track listing ==
All tracks are written by Baz Francis.

| No. | Title | Length |
|---|---|---|
| 1. | "I Just Love You More At Christmas" | 2:25 |
| 2. | "As My Heart Sinks" | 2:19 |

== Personnel ==
=== Musicians ===
- Baz Francis - Vocals, guitars, bass and keys
- Chris West - Sleigh bells and gang vocals on track 1
- Jason Bowld - Drums on track 1
- Robbie J. Holland - Live bass

=== Production ===
- Dave Draper - Recording, programming, mixing & mastering
- Baz Francis - Programming, re-arrangement
- Mike Corbyn - Re-arrangement
- Sam Browne - Re-arrangement
- Chris West - Programming

=== Art Direction ===
- Oly Edkins - Music video director
- Baz Francis - Artwork design & photography
- Tariq Hussain - Artwork layout
