= DVieD-EP =

EP by Donnie Vie
- Released: 2006
- Genre: Power pop
- Label: Cargo

Donnie Vie chronology
This & That (2004)	DVieD-EP (2006)	Extra Strength (2007)

DVieD-EP (pronounced "DVD EP") is an EP and the third release by Donnie Vie as a solo artist.

== Track listing ==
All original songs written by Donnie Vie

1. "Code Red" - 5:02
2. "Country Roads" (John Denver) - 3:55
3. "If You Could Read My Mind" (Gordon Lightfoot) - 3:00
4. "I Love the Way" - 3:25
5. "Lucy in the Sky with Diamonds" (The Beatles) - 4:14
6. "Somewhere" - 4:09
