= Just Enough! =

Studio album by Donnie Vie
- Released: September 17, 2003 (U.S.), September 24, 2003 (U.K.)
- Genre: Power pop
- Label: Cargo

Donnie Vie chronology
Just Enough! (2003)	This & That (2004)

Alternative Cover

Just Enough! is the first solo album released by Donnie Vie.

== Track listing ==
All songs written by Donnie Vie and Andrew Rollins

1. "Spider Web" - 4:11
2. "Better Days" -4:30
3. "Forever" - 4:56
4. "Jesus In Drag" - 4:21
5. "Wintergreen Eyes" - 4:02
6. "I'll Go On" - 3:15
7. "Alice In A Jam" - 4:29
8. "Don't Bring Me Down" - 4:07
9. "That's What Love Is" - 4:38
10. "Night Of Day" - 4:22
11. "Blowin' Kisses In The Wind" - 4:07
12. "Wasting Time" - 3:23

== Overview ==
The album was produced by Andrew Rollins and co-produced by Donnie Vie. The song, "Jesus in Drag" includes the hym, Jesus Loves Me as its introduction. The album included former Enuff Z'Nuff bandmate, Chip Z'Nuff on bass guitar. Former Dweezil Zappa bassist Christopher Maloney played bass on "Spider Web", "I'll Go On", and "Alice In A Jam".
