= Goodbye: Enough Z'Nuff =

Live album by Donnie Vie

Live album by Donnie Vie
- Released: February 24th, 2014
- Recorded: 2013
- Venue: The Garage; Ebbw Vale Institute; Burnham Mews
- Genre: Power pop, rock
- Label: Livewire/Cargo

Donnie Vie chronology
Wrapped Around My Middle Finger (2012)	Goodbye: Enough Z'Nuff (2014)	The White Album (2014)

Goodbye: Enough Z'Nuff is the Donnie Vie's sixth solo release. It is a live album and DVD recorded during Vie's Magical History Tour after his departure from the band Enuff Z'Nuff in 2013.

== Track listing ==
1. "For Now"
2. "Holly Wood Ya"
3. "These Days"
4. "You Got A Hold Of Me (Featuring Baz Francis)
5. "The Beast"
6. "Rainy Day"
7. "You And I"
8. "Fly High Michelle"
9. "If I Can't Have You"
10. "There Goes My Heart"
11. "New Thing (Featuring Baz Francis)"
12. "Time To Let You Go"
13. "Someday (Featuring Baz Francis)"
14. "Goodbye (Featuring Baz Francis)"

== DVD track Listing ==
- "My Dear Dream (Montage/New Recording)"
- "I've Fallen In Love Again"
- "Daddy's Girl (Live - Cremona)"
- "Donnie's riding a bike (Clip - Ipswich)"
- "Altered States (Live - Ahoghill)"
- "I Touch Myself (Clip Englefield Green)"
- "Black Coffee In Bed (Clip - Lucca)"
- "These Daze (Live - Ahoghill)"
- "Donnie & Baz admiring a John Lennon street drawing (Clip - Camden)"
- "Can't Take My Eyes Off You (Clip - Camden)"
- "Cat scratch (Clip - Englefield Green)"
- "That's What Love Is (Live - Englefield Green)"
- "Sanibel Island ( Live - Englefield Green)"
- "Tea-making with Baz Francis (Clip - Englefield Green)"
- "Barrie Anne Lost His Baby (Clip - Englefield Green)"
- "Time To Let You Go (Live - Englefield Green)"
- "Fuck off! (Clip - Camden)"
- "Home Tonight (Live - Englefield Green)"
- "Saying farewell (Clip - Englefield Green)"
- "Goodbye (Live - Englefield Green)"
- "New Thing (Intro)"
- "New Thing (Video)"
- "Fly High Michelle (Intro)"
- "Fly High Michelle (Video)"
- "She Wants More (Intro)"
- "She Wants More (Video)"
- "Baby Loves You (Intro)"
- "Baby Loves You (Video)"
- "Mother's Eyes (Intro)"
- "Mothers Eyes (Video)"
- "Right By Your Side (Intro)"
- "Right By Your Side (Video)"
- "You Got A Hold Of Me (Intro)"
- "You Got A Hold Of Me (Video)"
- "Bullet From A Gun (Intro)"
- "Bullet From A Gun (Video)"
- "Life Is Strange (Intro)"
- "Life Is Strange (Video)"
- "Wheels (Intro)"
- "Wheels (Video)"
- "Freak (Intro)"
- "Freak (Video)"
- "There Goes My Heart (Intro)"
- "There Goes My Heart (Video)"
- "Credits"

== Personnel ==
=== Musicians ===
- Donnie Vie - Vocals, Guitar
- Baz Francis - Vocals and guitar on tracks 4, 11, 13 & 14

=== Production ===
- Lewis John - Mixing & Mastering
- Baz Francis - Mixing on tracks 4, 11, 13 & 14
