= Russian Ballet (song) =

Single by Magic Eight Ball
- Released: October 22, 2013
- Genre: Rock, power pop
- Length: 6:02
- Label: Magic Cat Records
- Songwriter(s): Baz Francis

Magic Eight Ball singles chronology
"Stripped" (2009)	"Russian Ballet" (2013)	"Monkey Bars" (2014)

"Russian Ballet" is a song by Magic Eight Ball released as a digital single in support of their debut album Sorry We're Late But We're Worth The Wait. It contains an acoustic version of the band's song "Big Star" on the B-side.

== Music video ==
A music video directed by Emil Kunda & Baz Francis was released for the single.

The song is actually about my wonderful first trip to St. Petersburg in 2010, but I wanted the video to tell a dramatised version of what happened on my nightmare return the following year. I actually think the positivity of the song and negativity of the video combine really well and help create an overall picture of my Russian experiences. Emil's great work has a lot to do with that though.

— Baz Francis

== Track listing ==
All tracks are written by Baz Francis.

No.	Title	Length
1.	"Russian Ballet (Русский балет)"	3:31
2.	"Big Star (Acoustic Session)"	2:31

== Personnel ==
=== Musicians ===
- Baz Francis: All vocals, guitars and bass
- Jason Bowld: Drums

=== Production ===
- Dave Draper - Mixing & Mastering, Production, Additional guitar arrangement on 'Russian Ballet (Русский балет)
- Baz Francis - Production
- Executive Producer - Donnie Vie

=== Art direction ===
- Emil Kunda - Music video Directing, Editing, Filming
- Baz Francis - Single Artwork, Music video directing.
- Karol Łakomiec - Filming
- Sandra Sventina - Shoot assistance
- Kay Dougan - Shoot Assistance
- Andrea Duarte - Single Artwork
