= Johnny Gioeli =

American rock singer (born 1967)

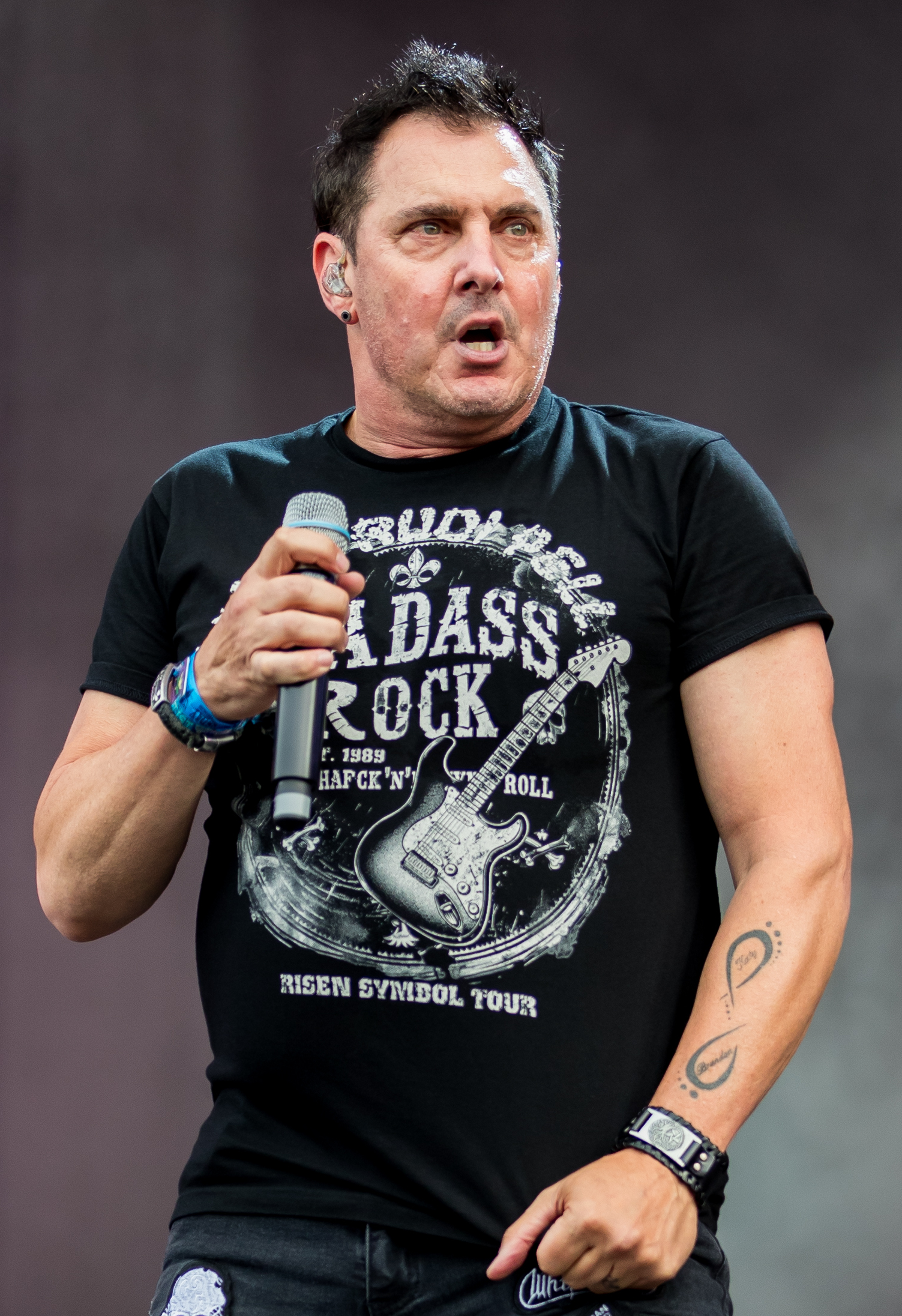
- Gioeli in 2024

Background information
- Born: October 5, 1967 (age 59); Brooklyn, New York, U.S.
- Genres: Arena rock; heavy metal; hard rock; glam metal; power metal; melodic rock; orchestral rock
- Occupations: Singer; songwriter
- Years active: 1983–present
- Member of: Hardline; Crush 40; Axel Rudi Pell

Johnny Gioeli (/ˌdʒiːoʊˈɛli/ JEE-oh-EL-ee; born October 5, 1967) is an American rock singer. He is the lead vocalist of Hardline, Crush 40, and Axel Rudi Pell's backing band. He is known for his musical contributions to the Sonic the Hedgehog video game series since 1998, as part of Crush 40.

== Biography ==
Gioeli's musical career began in the early 1980s after forming the band Phaze with his older brother, Joey. In 1983, at the age of 16, he started drumming and sharing vocal duties with Joey with the band Killerhit. The four-piece act hit the East Coast club circuit with an enormous amount of success, earning enough by 1987 to purchase their own lighting rig, truck and tour bus (purchased from Jimmy Buffett's guitar player in Memphis).

Killerhit re-located to Hollywood and met with bandmate and guitarist Christopher Paul's friend Bret Michaels, Poison's lead singer. He introduced them to his former publicist Debra Rosner, who instantly became the band's manager. Realizing the band needed for a front man, Gioeli left the drum stool for center stage. Las Vegas native Darek Thomas Cava took his place behind the drum kit. After they changed their name to Brunette, the band broke The Doors and Van Halen's single-weekend attendance records on the Sunset Strip in Hollywood, California. This brought the band attention and they were courted by top record executives. Difficulties developed in the band before a recording deal could be secured, and Brunette broke up in 1991.

Gioeli started working with his brother Joey on songs for an album they were going to call Brothers. However, Neal Schon, Journey's guitarist (who was married to their sister) met with them and asked if he could play with them, and they agreed. In 1992, they formed as a band and called themselves Hardline, they released their first effort, Double Eclipse. It was not successful enough to get into the mainstream, especially considering its post-Nirvana release.

They began writing songs for a second album but called it quits while recording the songs due to troubles with their manager and Neal Schon. Gioeli had all but disappeared from the music scene until, in 1998, German guitarist Axel Rudi Pell found himself in need of a vocalist after the departure of Jeff Scott Soto. Pell had admired Gioeli for a long time, stating he always thought Gioeli's vocals would go well with his music. Pell eventually found means of contacting Gioeli and flew him to Germany to record vocals for his Oceans of Time CD, which up to date has been considered as one of the best Pell albums. He is now the permanent lead vocalist of the band and shows no signs of leaving.

He also participated in Michael Voss's compilation album titled Voices Of Rock - MMVII, released on July 20, 2007, on which he performed the song "Phoenix Rising". In 1994, Gioeli also collaborated with musician Doug Aldrich, who had performed live as a guest guitarist for Brunette, and performed the vocals for the song "Face Down" featured on Aldrich's Highcentered album, later included again on Aldrich's 2002 album Alter Ego. Gioeli released his first solo album, entitled One Voice, which was released through PledgeMusic on December 7, 2018.

=== Hardline's returning album ===
After considerable success of their debut CD, Double Eclipse, the band was dissolved for ten years during which Gioeli and his brother followed a career in internet business. After he met with further success in Axel Rudi Pell's band, Gioeli and his band Hardline returned with a new lineup to release their second album entitled II, released in 2002, followed by the live CD/DVD in 2003, named Live at the Gods Festival 2002. Their third album, Leaving the End Open, was released April 17, 2009. On December 22, 2011, Gioeli confirmed, via Frontiers Records official site, that he and Italian producer and keyboard player Alessandro Del Vecchio would release Hardline's fourth studio album Danger Zone on May 18, 2012, yet again with a new lineup. On October 14, 2016, Hardline's fifth studio album, Human Nature, was released. In 2019, Gioeli officially announced Hardline's sixth album, Life, which was released on April 26, 2019. This will be the first Hardline album featuring a cover song since the debut album's track "Hot Cherie". This time, the cover is Queen's "Who Wants to Live Forever", a personal favorite of Gioeli's.

=== Crush 40 ===
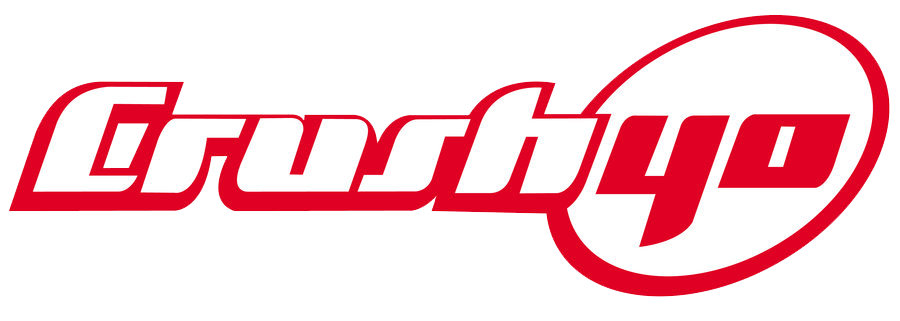
Logo of Crush 40

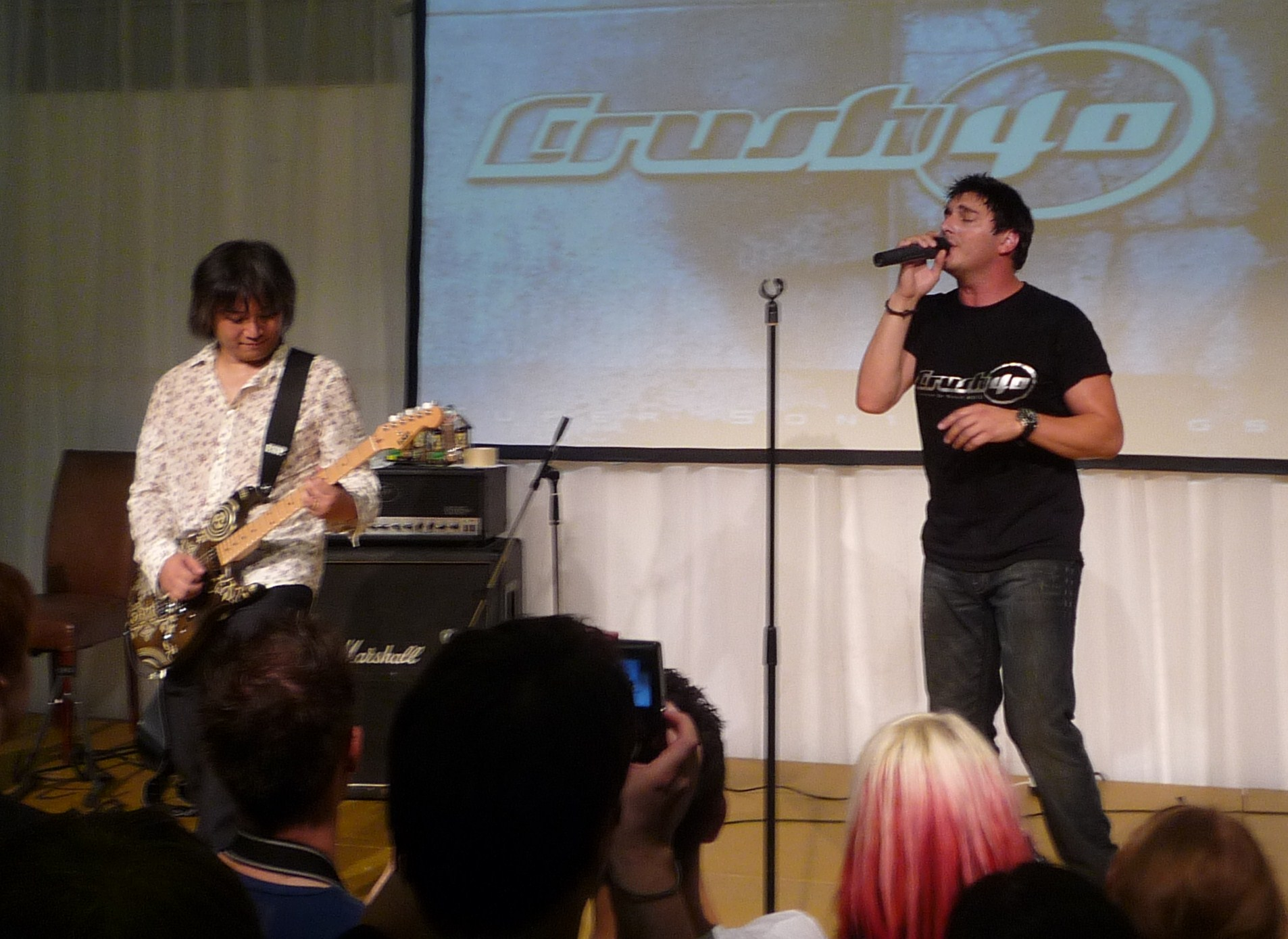
Gioeli as the vocalist of Crush 40, with lead guitarist Jun Senoue. The band has written and performed songs inspired by and for the Sonic the Hedgehog series.

In addition to being a vocalist for two bands, he has also been working with video game composer and musician Jun Senoue and has delivered his vocals in the Sons of Angels CD; Thrill of the Feel, released in 2000. The band has since changed their name to Crush 40. They have written and performed several songs from the Sonic the Hedgehog series produced by Sega and Sonic Team, such as the theme tune "Sonic Heroes" from the game of the same name, a bright, melodic song and in contrast to "What I'm Made Of...", a distinctly dark, energetic hard rock song for the final battle against Metal Overlord. He was also the vocalist for the songs "Open Your Heart", the main theme of Sonic Adventure, "Live and Learn", the main theme of Sonic Adventure 2, "I Am... All of Me", the main theme of Shadow the Hedgehog, the ending theme "Never Turn Back", a cover of the band Magna-Fi's "All Hail Shadow", for the ending theme of Shadow's story in Sonic the Hedgehog 2006, and "Knight of the Wind", the main theme of Sonic and the Black Knight as well as the ending theme "Live Life". Additionally, Gioeli has worked with Senoue to produce a cover of Steve Conte's "Seven Rings in Hand" (the main theme of Sonic and the Secret Rings), which was featured exclusively on the Japan-only release True Blue: The Best of Sonic the Hedgehog. He also wrote the chorus for the Sonic the Hedgehog theme song "His World" and recorded a version of the song with Crush 40 (featured as a bonus track on the game's official soundtrack).

Gioeli provided his vocals on the soundtrack to the game Sonic and the Black Knight on the tracks "Fight the Knight" and "Through the Fire". In October 2008, Gioeli and Senoue took the stage at the Tokyo Game Show to perform some of their most popular Sonic-based songs in front of a live audience for the first time. Gioeli and Senoue have since created a YouTube account and uploaded video footage of the event.

In 2009, a new Crush 40 album was released entitled The Best of Crush 40 – Super Sonic Songs. This compilation album contains most of the band's Sonic the Hedgehog releases as well as a mixture of old tracks from the NASCAR Arcade game and some brand new songs including a cover of "Un-Gravitify", the main theme of Sonic Riders: Zero Gravity, a cover of the Cult's "Fire Woman", and an original ballad entitled "Is It You". The album also contains remixed tracks of "Open Your Heart", "I Am... All of Me", "His World", and "Knight of the Wind".

In 2010, Gioeli performed with Senoue as Crush 40 at the 2010 Summer of Sonic convention in London on August 7, 2010. It was Crush 40's first full-length performance and their first performance outside Japan. In that same year, they recorded a cover of "Free", the main theme of Sonic Free Riders originally performed by Chris Madin, as a bonus track in the game's official soundtrack. In 2011, the band performed at Sonic Boom to celebrate Sonic's 20th anniversary. In addition to this, they also performed in Tokyo at Live Stage Guilty stage, of which many concert videos were produced In 2012, the band performed at two conventions. The first of which being at the Summer of Sonic 2012 convention in Brighton and at the Sonic Boom convention in San Diego during San Diego Comic-Con. The band released their first live album on October 3, 2012, entitled Live!, which featured songs from their concerts in Tokyo in March of that same year. In 2013, the band performed in St. Louis for the Sonic Boom 2013 event, along with another performance at the Japan Game Music Festival in January of that year. In 2015, the band released 2 Nights 2 Remember featuring four brand new songs and thirteen songs from their 2N2R live tour in 2014. They appeared in 2016 at the House of Blues in San Diego to play several tracks for the 25th anniversary of the Sonic series. In 2017 and 2018, Gioeli performed solo at TooManyGames.

In 2018, Sega announced a new Sonic racing game titled Team Sonic Racing which features a new Crush 40 song called "Green Light Ride", which serves as the game's main theme. The game was released on May 21, 2019. In an interview, Gioeli stated that a second Crush 40 "Best of" album was currently in the works and would be known as Driving Through Forever: The Ultimate Crush 40 Collection, which was released on July 24, 2019. The album contains a brand new song called "Call Me Crazy". To honor 30 years of the Sonic franchise, the Sonic the Hedgehog 30th Anniversary Symphony took place on June 23, 2021, with Crush 40 as one of the acts. Gioeli provided his vocals for the song "Crushing Thirties" by The Chalkeaters, a three-man music group out of Saint Petersburg, Russia. The song is also themed to Sonic's 30th anniversary, however, it features Sonic facing a midlife crisis at thirty years old.

In 2024, Gioeli confirmed the band's song "Live and Learn" would be in the film Sonic the Hedgehog 3. That December, he sued Sega for unpaid royalties from Live and Learn's use in ports of Sonic Adventure 2 and subsequent games and media. Gioeli contends that while Sega owns the lyrics, he owns the composition and master recording. He claims Sega owes him $1 million in restitution and damages. On 28th August 2025, the lawsuit was dismissed in favor of Sega, after failure to file timely opposition to summary judgment.

=== Gio Brando ===
In February 2026 Gioeli has started his first Nerdcore duo Gio Brando with the composer Brandon Yates who's known for his work on Death Battle, It was released on February 5 on Yates' YouTube channel. The track also features Matt Bernal from Yates' team as a session guitarist. They released their new track in April titled "The Otter Side" which also features Victor Borba.

== Discography ==
=== Guest / feature performances ===
- Highcentered with Doug Aldrich (1994)
- Episode 2: In Search of the Little Prince with Genius (2004)
- She's On Fire with Accomplice (2006)
- MMVII with Voices of Rock (2007)
- Cry Wolf with Wolfpakk (2013)
- Herman Rarebell: Let It Shine (feat. Al Crespo) (2014)
- Set the World on Fire with Deen Castronovo (2018)
- Robert Rodrigo Band: Living for Louder (2018)
- Restless Spirits (2019)
- Dreams and Nightmares with FB 1964 (2020)
- Britannia with Legado de una Tragedia (2020)
- Jaded with Svetlana Bliznakova Sevi (2021)
- Circus of Rock: Come One, Come All (2021)
- Jeff Scott Soto: The Duets Collection, Vol. 1 (2021)
- Crushing Thirties with The Chalkeaters (2022)
- Fastest Thing Alive with Chewie (2022)
- Restless Spirits: Second to None (2022)
- Bring You Back with Emi Jones (2022)
- Drowning with Sevi (2022)
- She Has Rainbow Eyes with PACCBETOB (2023)
- Keep it Real with Zakkujo (2023)
- Darker Side of Me with Victor McKnight, BillyTheBard11th & Joshua Taipale (2023)
- Tournament Arc (2024)
- What About My Reward with Bob Birthisel (2024)
- GI Joe: Wrath of Corba with Tee Lopes (2024)
- The Machine with Alessandro Del Vecchio (2024)
- Feel the Fire with Eresse (2024)
- Kill a Man with Sevi (2024)
- Unspoken Words with Глутницата / Glutnitsata (2024)
- Ride Like Lightning (Crash Like Thunder) [feat. Tony Hernando] with HIGH KINGS RISING(2024)
- Out Of This World (with Arcade Dreams) (2024)
- Mike Tramp – Songs Of White Lion (Vol. II) (2024)
- Rain Must Fall [feat. Tony Hernando] with HIGH KINGS RISING (2025)
- It's Going Down Now (with GameCage) (2025)
- Sonic - You Can Do Anything (with Fabian) (2025)
- Breath In, Breath Out (with David Johnson Kim) (2025)
- Unknown Trials (with Pauly B & UltraSonicHero) (2025)
- Rings of Saturn (with Kamikaze B****) (2025)
- THE BATTLES THAT MADE US [feat. Tony Hernando] with HIGH KINGS RISING (2025)
- Point of no Return (with GDubA) (2025)
- Pokémon Theme (with Friends with Bennys & ToxicxEternity) (2025)
- DON'T BLINK (with AstraNova & ThatGuyNamedPanther) (2025)
- Jean Paul's Dream Vision: Reminiscences (2025)
- Brace Yourself (with Better Kenney & Tristantine the Great) (2026)
- Hangin' In The Balance (with BobTheGUYYYYY & Dad's Last Nerve) (2026)
- Super Sonic Hero (with aerozity & dyno_19) (2026)
- Watch Me Burn (with Brandon Yates) (2026)
- I Remain (with David Johnson Kim) (2026)
- Heart of Sorrow (with REXORIA) (2026)
- BREAK THE LIMITS (with Ashly28) (2026)
- Breaking Point (with bucketmakesmusic, ace_hedge, & dmbomb) (2026)
- FINAL ESCAPE (with Chron Delta, 𝙰𝚔𝚑𝚝., Joshua Taipale & Juanemus) (2026)
- Thobias Wiklund: The Gates of Heaven (2026)
- Chaos Strikes Back (with Brandon Yates & Anthony DiGiacomo) (2026)

=== Brunette ===
- Demos 1989–1990 (2014)
- Rough Demos (2014)

=== Hardline ===
- Double Eclipse (1992)
- II (2002)
- Live at the Gods Festival 2002 (Live CD/DVD) (2003)
- Leaving the End Open (2009)
- Danger Zone (2012)
- Human Nature (2016)
- Life (2019)
- Life Live (2020)
- Heart, Mind and Soul (2021)
- Shout (2026)

=== Axel Rudi Pell ===
- Oceans of Time (1998)
- The Ballads II (1999)
- The Masquerade Ball (2000)
- The Wizard's Chosen Few (Compilation) (2000)
- Shadow Zone (2002)
- Knights Live (Live CD) (2002)
- Knight Treasures (Live and More) DVD (2002)
- Kings And Queens (2004)
- The Ballads III (2004)
- Mystica (2006)
- Diamonds Unlocked (2007)
- Live Over Europe 2008 DVD (2008)
- Tales of the Crown (2008)
- The Best of Axel Rudi Pell: Anniversary Edition (2009)
- One Night Live DVD (2010)
- The Crest (2010)
- The Ballads IV (2011)
- Circle of the Oath (2012)
- Live on Fire (Live CD/Live DVD) (2013)
- Into the Storm (2014)
- Magic Moments (Live CD/Live DVD) (2015)
- Game of Sins (2016)
- The Ballads V (2017)
- Knights Call (2018)
- XXX Anniversary Live (2019)
- Sign of the Times (2020)
- Diamonds Unlocked II (2021)
- Lost XXIII (2022)
- The Ballads VI (2023)
- Risen Symbol (2024)
- Ghost Town (2026)

=== Crush 40 ===
- Thrill of the Feel (as Sons of Angels) - (2000)
- Crush 40 (European release of Thrill of the Feel) - (2003)
- The Best of Crush 40 - Super Sonic Songs (2009)
- Rise Again (2012)
- Live! (2012)
- 2 Nights 2 Remember (2015)
- Driving Through Forever: The Ultimate Crush 40 Collection (2019)

=== Solo ===
- One Voice (2018)
- Colorblind - EP (2018)
- Heaven in Flames - Single (2024)
- SOS (with Joshua Taipale) (2026)

=== Enemy Eyes ===
- Here We Are - Single (2022)
- History's Hand (2022)

== Gaming appearances ==
=== Main appearances ===
Games to which Johnny Gioeli specifically contributed to as a songwriter and/or performer.

- Sonic Adventure (1998) - Vocalist (Open Your Heart)
- NASCAR Arcade (2000) - Vocalist (all songs), lyricist (Watch Me Fly, Fuel Me)
- Sonic Adventure 2 (2001) - Vocalist, lyricist (Live & Learn)
- Sonic Heroes (2003) - Vocalist, lyricist (Sonic Heroes, What I'm Made Of...)
- Pro Yakyuu Team o Tsukurou! 3 (2005) - Lyricist (Batter Up!, Mr. Baseball), backing vocalist (Batter Up!)
- Shadow the Hedgehog (2005) - Vocalist, lyricist (I Am... All of Me, Never Turn Back)
- Sonic the Hedgehog (2006) - Lyricist (His World), vocalist (All Hail Shadow)
- Sonic and the Black Knight (2009) - Lyricist (all songs), vocalist (Knight of the Wind, Through the Fire, Fight the Knight, Live Life)
- Sonic Free Riders (2010) - Lyricist (Free)
- Team Sonic Racing (2019) - Vocalist, lyricist (Green Light Ride)
- Jitsu Squad (2022) - Vocalist
- G.I. Joe: Wrath of Cobra (2024) - Vocalist
- Toree Saturn (2025) - Vocalist (Rings of Saturn)
- Outcome Memories (2025) - Vocalist (Don't Blink, Super Sonic Hero)
- Eternal Nightmare (2026) - Vocalist, Lyricist (Breaking Point)
- Cassette Beasts 2002 (2026) - Vocalist (Ages of Change)

=== Other appearances ===
Games that had Gioeli's music reused from other titles.

- Phantasy Star Online (2000)
- Super Smash Bros. Brawl (2008)
- Mario & Sonic at the Olympic Winter Games (2009)
- Yakuza 4 (2010)
- Sonic Generations (2011)
- Mario & Sonic at the London 2012 Olympic Games (2011)
- Phantasy Star Online 2 (2012)
- Yakuza 5 (2012)
- Mario & Sonic at the Sochi 2014 Olympic Winter Games (2013)
- Maimai (2014)
- Super Smash Bros. for Nintendo 3DS and Wii U (2014)
- Sonic Runners (2015)
- Mario & Sonic at the Rio 2016 Olympic Games (2016)
- Super Smash Bros. Ultimate (2018)
- Mario & Sonic at the Olympic Games Tokyo 2020 (2019)
- Fist of the North Star LEGENDS ReVIVE (2019)
- Monster Hunter Rise (2021)
- Sonic Frontiers (2022)
- Shadow Generations (2024)
- Sonic Racing: CrossWorlds (2025)
