= Mother Nature's Candy =

EP by Magic Eight Ball
- Released: June 1, 2011
- Recorded: 2010–2011
- Studios: Langshot; Hill Place; The Panic Room; Burnham Mews; Silent Hill Rehearsal Studios; Radio Bronglais; Radio Reverb; The Cellar Bar; Brooklands FM
- Genres: Rock, power pop
- Label: Magic Cat Records

Magic Eight Ball chronology
A Peacock's Tale (2007)	Mother Nature's Candy (2011)	Sorry We're Late But We're Worth The Wait (2013)

Mother Nature's Candy is an EP released by Magic Eight Ball. It is also their first release on their own record label, Magic Cat Records.

== Track listing ==
All tracks are written by Baz Francis.

No.	Title	Length
1.	"Perils Of Honesty"
2.	"Big Star (Original Version)"
3.	"Sunday Mornings (Original Version)"
4.	"Love Makes You Do Some Funny Things (Original Version)"
5.	"Rhubarb & Custard (Cats In My Home)"

Digital Download Bonus Tracks (No Longer Available)
No.	Title	Length
6.	"Perils Of Honesty (Acoustic Radio Session)"
7.	"Big Star (Acoustic Live Radio Session)"
8.	"Sunday Mornings (Live)"
9.	"Love Makes You Do Some Funny Things (Live)"
10.	"Rhubarb & Custard (Cats In My Home) (Acoustic Radio Session)"

== Personnel ==
=== Musicians ===
- Baz Francis - All vocals, guitars, bass and keyboards (except where stated otherwise below)
- Kate Wilkinson - Drums/percussion on tracks 1–4, additional backing vocals on track 3
- Michael Gates: Percussion on track 5 and live drums on iTunes bonus tracks 8 and 9
- Andy Copper: Live bass on iTunes bonus tracks 8 and 9
- Dave Draper - Triggers and drum samples on tracks 1–4

=== Production ===
- Dave Draper - Mixing & Mastering, Production & Engineering on tracks 2–5
- Baz Francis - Production on tracks 1–5, engineering on tracks 2 & 4, Engineering & additional mixing on tracks 1, 2, 4 & 5
- Kate Wilkinson - Production, Engineering & Additional mixing on tracks 1–4
- Michael Gates - Production on track 5

=== Art Direction ===
- Giles Edwards - Artwork design & Concept
- Julia Petrova - Inside modelling, photographs
- Maryhèléna Francis - Illustrations
- Baz Francis - Artwork concept, photographs
- Patricia Board - Photographs
- Charlie Brown - Photographs

=== Additional Credits ===
- Custard Francis - Opening sound on track 5
- Rhubarb Francis - Closing sound on track 5
