= Danger Zone (Hardline album) =

Studio album by Hardline
- Released: May 18, 2012 (International edition); May 30, 2012 (Japanese edition)
- Studio: Ivorytears Music Works, Somma Lombardo; Impronte Sonore, Cascina; COP Studio, Bielefeld; The Box, CT
- Genre: Hard rock
- Length: 57:38 (International edition); 63:00 (Japanese edition)
- Label: Frontiers (International edition); Rubicon Music (Japanese edition)
- Producer: Alessandro Del Vecchio

Hardline chronology
Leaving the End Open (2009)	Danger Zone (2012)	Human Nature (2016)

Professional ratings
Review scores
Source	Rating
Classic Rock	7/10 stars
Rock Hard	7.5/10
Screamer Magazine	(favourable)

Danger Zone is American hard rock band Hardline's fourth studio album, and their first since Leaving the End Open. Johnny Gioeli is the sole returning member from the Leaving the End Open lineup, and is joined by keyboardist and producer Alessandro Del Vecchio, guitarist Thorsten Koehne, bassist Anna Portalupi, and drummer Francesco Jovino. Danger Zone was released in Europe on May 18, 2012, and in America on May 22, both through Frontiers Records.

Unlike previous Hardline albums, Johnny Gioeli did not initiate the project, nor was he the primary songwriter. The project came to fruition when Alessandro Del Vecchio, a longtime fan of Hardline, of Eden's Curse and Edge of Forever wrote and composed songs with Gioeli's vocals specifically in mind, then proceeded to record demos to send to Frontiers Records president Serafino Perugino. Perugino, after listening to and approving the demos, sent them to Gioeli, who immediately became interested in reforming Hardline and recording the songs for a new album. Gioeli and Del Vecchio were joined by Thorsten Koehne, also of Eden's Curse, Anna Portalupi of Lionville, and Francesco Jovino, also of Edge of Forever.

Gioeli has noted that he plans for Hardline to be significantly more active than it has been since its revival in 2001, and that he and Del Vecchio began writing for a follow-up album during the summer and making plans for a tour to initiate during the winter of 2012. This marks the first time in the band's history that a second album will closely follow a release, as well as the band's first tour since 1992, and first live performances since Live at the Gods Festival 2002. Until further touring plans come to fruition, Hardline's only scheduled live performances are the Sweden Rock Festival on June 7, 2013, and the 2013 "FireFest" Melodic Rock Festival in Nottingham, UK from October 18–20. Axel Rudi Pell drummer Mike Terrana and returning Hardline guitarist Josh Ramos perform in place of Thorsten Koehne and Francesco Jovino.

== Track listing ==
No.	Title	Writer(s)	Length
1.	"Fever Dreams"	Alessandro Del Vecchio	5:14
2.	"10,000 Reasons"	Matti Alfonzetti, Daniel Flores	4:13
3.	"Danger Zone"	Del Vecchio	6:03
4.	"What I'd Like"	Del Vecchio	4:22
5.	"Stronger Than Me"	Christer Gustavsson, Emil Vaker	4:58
6.	"Never Too Late for Love"	Curt Cuomo, Harry Paress	4:22
7.	"Stay"	Del Vecchio	5:39
8.	"I Don't Wanna Breakaway"	Chris Laney, Johan Becker	3:55
9.	"Look at You Now"	Johan Stentorp	4:02
10.	"Please Have Faith in Me"	Fred Hendrix	4:48
11.	"Show Me Your Love"	Del Vecchio	4:59
12.	"The Only One"	Del Vecchio	5:03
Total length:			57:38

Japanese edition bonus track
No.	Title	Writer(s)	Length
13.	"Danger Zone" (acoustic version)	Del Vecchio	5:22

== Personnel ==
- Johnny Gioeli - lead vocals
- Alessandro Del Vecchio - keyboards, backing vocals
- Thorsten Koehne - guitars
- Anna Portalupi - bass
- Francesco Jovino - drums
