= Leaving the End Open =

Studio album by Hardline
- Released: April 17, 2009 (International edition)
- Genre: Hard rock
- Length: 52:01 (International edition); 56:57 (Japanese edition)
- Label: Frontiers (International edition); Nexus (Japanese edition)
- Producer: Bob Burch

Hardline chronology
Live at the Gods Festival 2002 (2003)	Leaving the End Open (2009)	Danger Zone (2012)

Leaving the End Open is the third studio album by the American rock group Hardline. This is their first album since 2002's II. The new line up for the album features two new band members, Jamie Brown on bass guitar and Atma Anur on drums. The album was released on April 17, 2009, in the UK and it was released in the USA on May 2, 2009, and in Japan on May 27, 2009.

Japanese guitarist and video game musician Jun Senoue from Gioeli's other band, Crush 40, is listed as a special guest on the song "Before This," where he is credited for the guitar solo.

== Background ==
The album was called "Just Add Water" when it was in the works for several years, beginning in 2004, but Johnny Gioeli gave the title tentatively while planning a different title. During early development in 2004, Rudy Sarzo was slated to record bass, as suggested by Michael T. Ross, but was unable to contribute due to a busy schedule consisting of touring with Yngwie Malmsteen and Ronnie James Dio. Joey Gioeli had also planned to contribute lyrics and rhythm guitar, but seemingly retired from the music industry to manage the Gioeli brothers' companies full-time. Leaving the End Open is the last of Hardline's albums produced by veteran studio man Bob Burch, as well as featuring keyboardist Michael T. Ross.

Eight known songs were to be included on the album, as revealed in 2006: "My Heart," "Hold On," a demo originally recorded by Hardline's predecessor, Brunette, "Hole in My Head," "Save Me," "Falling Rain," "Looking at the World," "I Surrender," and "What If." "Hole In My Head" is the only aforementioned song that is confirmed to have been included on the final release. "I Surrender" would go on to be released on Hardline's seventh album, Heart, Mind and Soul, in 2021.

== Track listing ==
All songs by Johnny Gioeli and Josh Ramos, except where noted.

No.	Title	Writer(s)	Length
1.	"Voices"		4:30
2.	"Falling Free"		4:41
3.	"Start Again"		5:28
4.	"Pieces of Puzzles"		3:55
5.	"Bittersweet"		5:22
6.	"She Sleeps in Madness"		4:56
7.	"In This Moment"	Gioeli	3:20
8.	"Give in to This Love"		4:07
9.	"Before This"		3:52
10.	"Hole in My Head"	Gioeli, Johnny Montgomery	5:35
11.	"Leaving the End Open"		5:45

Japanese edition bonus track
No.	Title	Length
12.	"She Sleeps in Madness" (remix)	4:09

== Personnel ==
- Johnny Gioeli - Vocals
- Josh Ramos - Guitars
- Michael T. Ross - Keyboards
- Jamie Brown - Bass
- Atma Anur - Drums
- Jun Senoue - Guitars ("Before This")

== Charts ==
Chart (2009)	Peak position
Japanese Albums (Oricon)	218
