= Christopher Maloney =

American singer-songwriter

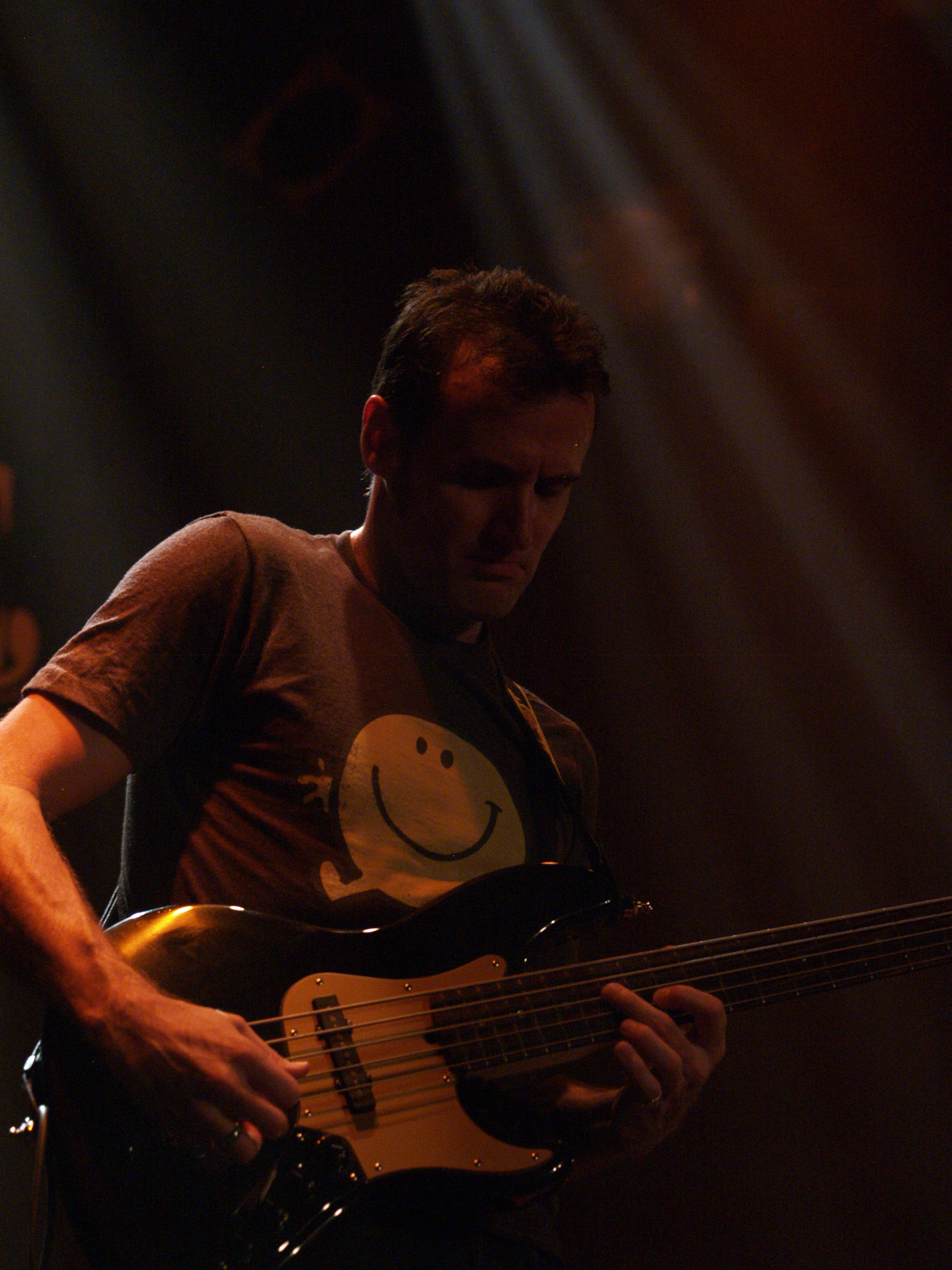
- Christopher Maloney in Japan with Cosmosquad, September 2008

Background information
- Born: Christopher Patrick Maloney; March 22, 1969 (age 57)
- Origin: Syracuse, New York, United States
- Genres: Rock, Pop, Fusion, Funk
- Instruments: Bass guitar, guitar
- Years active: 1993–present
- Label: Sunset Records
- Website: Christopher Maloney Official website

Christopher Patrick Maloney is an American singer-songwriter, bass guitarist and music educator. He is widely known for his work with instrumental hard rock band Cosmosquad, his stints in Hardline and with Dweezil Zappa, as an independent solo artist, an instructor at the Musicians Institute, the co-owner of Absolute Music Studios and the co-creator of the online music education site Practice Warriors.

== Biography ==
=== Early life and education ===
Christopher Maloney was born in Syracuse, New York on March 22, 1969. Both his father and mother were from families of Irish descent, the former from Limerick and the latter from Kilkenny. After failed attempts at the recorder and drums, Christopher discovered the bass guitar at age 13 and began performing in local bars and clubs. While attending East Syracuse-Minoa High School, he won a citation from the International Association of Jazz Educators (IAJE), the Louis Armstrong Jazz Award, and performed for then-Vice President George H. W. Bush. He attended Oswego State University from 1987 until 1991 graduating with a double major in Music and Broadcasting. It was here that he was mentored by jazz composer Stan Gosek, who helped shape Maloney's skills in composition, odd meter, reading, performing and music business.

Maloney relocated to Los Angeles in 1993 to attend the Musicians Institute. He studied with many notable musicians, including Jeff Berlin, Steve Bailey, Scott Henderson, Joe Diorio and visiting artists Victor Wooten, Gary Willis and many others. He graduated with Vocational Honors in 1994 as the bass program's Outstanding Student of the Year.

=== Bass career ===
Maloney spent much of the mid to late 1990s working as a freelance bass player in Los Angeles. His first major label recording was with drum prodigy Jacob Armen on his Drum Fever CD, which was released on Prince's NPG Records/Warner Bros. label. In 1996, after a lengthy audition process, he was asked to join brothers Dweezil Zappa and Ahmet Zappa in their band "Z" to promote the album Music For Pets. Maloney spent much of 1997 recording dozens of songs for a Dweezil solo album. From those sessions, only "Automatic" (featuring Blues Saraceno) and "Dick Cinnamon's Office" (featuring Lisa Loeb) were included on the Favored Nations release, Automatic. He concluded the 90's by doing recording and performing with Jon Stevens (INXS), Donnie Vie (Enuff Z'Nuff), and jazz keyboardist Lao Tizer.

Maloney's recording and performing career continued to rise in the 2000s. He performed or recorded with Hardline, featuring Journey guitarist Neal Schon, Gilli Moon, Chieli Minucci, UFO singer Phil Mogg (in the band $ign of 4), Lao Tizer, New Kids on the Block singer Joey McIntyre, Jack Avalon, and Cosmosquad among others. Maloney's work with Lao Tizer netted two albums (to which he is credited as co-writer) and numerous US festival tours, including shows with Wayne Shorter, George Benson, Al Jarreau, Spyrogyra, Chris Botti, The Rippingtons, Average White Band, Jethro Tull, Tom Scott and others. His work with Cosmosquad, and its guitarist Jeff Kollman, brought him to Europe and Japan and produced three albums. Cosmosquad released their first live DVD Light...Camera...Squad! in 2008, with Maloney also handling all the video editing duties. During this time, he continued to record and perform as a sideman to independent artists in Los Angeles. Over the years, Maloney has been endorsed by Linc Luthier, Carvin and Fender Basses, Trace Elliot and SWR amplifiers, and Dean Markley and D'Addario Strings.

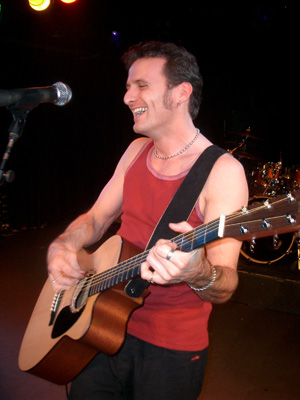
Christopher Maloney performing an acoustic set in Hollywood, CA circa 2004

=== Solo career ===
In 2000, Maloney decided to begin to make a solo album that would not feature his bass playing, but his voice and song writing skills. Although joined by his friends, drummer Shane Gaalaas and guitarist Brett Garsed, Maloney played most of the instruments himself. The result was the CD Control, released in 2002 on Sunset Records. Spending much of 2002 on the road with Lao Tizer, Cosmosquad and $ign of Four, Maloney had to wait until 2003 to promote the album. He did so mostly by performing solo acoustic shows in coffeehouses throughout Southern California.

In 2004, Maloney continued to promote Control while writing songs for a new album, entitled The Terrors of Intimacy. The album was released in March 2005 on Sunset Records, and Maloney promoted it by doing a solo acoustic tour of the southwest US and full band shows in Southern California.

In addition to writing songs for his solo albums, Maloney has made three production music CDs for De Wolfe Music in England: Rock Styles (2003), Rock Styles 2 (2005), and Indie Rock Chart (2008). Songs from these CDs have been placed in television and films in over 50 countries, with US usage including Saturday Night Live, CNN, biography, NBC Sports and more. He is also a three-time ASCAP award-winner songwriter. Maloney's writing of his third CD, titled Lost And Found, was interrupted by his work with De Wolfe Music, tours and recording with Cosmosquad, producing the television pilot Backstage Pass, running a music school in south Florida and starting his online music education site Practice Warriors. It was finally released on September 18, 2025, on Sunset Records.

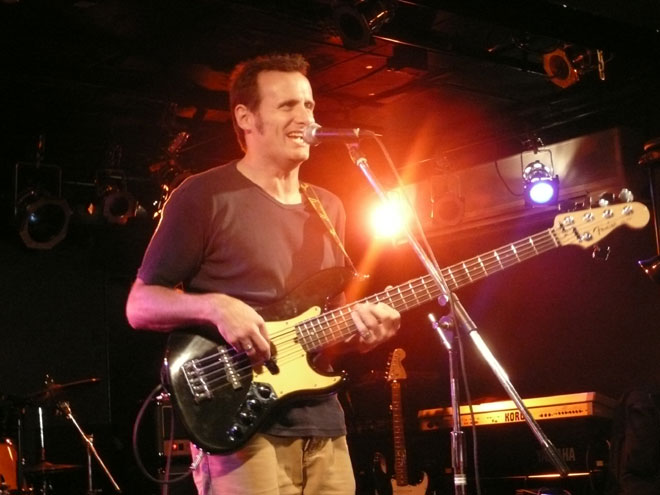
Christopher Maloney performing an educational concert/clinic in Tokyo

=== Education career ===
In addition to his work as a bassist and singer-songwriter, Maloney has been very passionate about music education. Upon his graduation from Musicians Institute, he was immediately invited to join the faculty at the school. Maloney's long affiliation with MI has included him teaching bass, songwriting, music theory and vocal classes as well as being the head of the school's Encore Program. He has also traveled internationally to promote the school through concerts and clinics. Maloney's outgoing personality and music education experience helped him to develop a strong interviewing style, which he took advantage of at MI. His Q&A session with Duran Duran bassist John Taylor during an MI event was so engaging that Taylor included it as part of his solo album MetaFour in 2002. Maloney also interviewed his friend Glenn Hughes (Deep Purple) as part of an interview-style television pilot called Backstage Pass in 2007.

Maloney has toured as a clinician for many of his endorsing companies, including Fender and Linc Luthier basses. He created the Interactive Band Workshop in 2004, which was an interactive educational experience he conducted at music stores throughout south Florida. Maloney has also written an instructional book for Hal Leonard Publishing entitled Progressive Rock Bass, which was released in January 2010.

In September 2008, Maloney wanted to expand his knowledge of music and education, and he once again enrolled full-time at the Musicians Institute. He spent nine months studying his fellow instructors' teaching methods in voice, keyboards, drums and guitar. In doing so, Maloney has the unique distinction in being the only person in MI history to be a full-time student and full-time instructor simultaneously.

In August 2009, Maloney and his fiancee (now wife) Kristina opened Absolute Music Studios, a state-of-the-art music lesson facility in Jupiter, Florida. The studio focused on modern teaching techniques with an emphasis on contemporary music, as well as recording commercial albums for many of their students. Notable former students include The Voice and American Idol contestant Allegra Miles and Nashville bassist Morgan Beers. One former teacher, Chris Condon, moved on to be musical director for Billy Ray Cyrus. Many famous musicians have endorsed Absolute Music Studios, including members of the Red Hot Chili Peppers, Pink Floyd, Tears For Fears, Korn, Alan Parsons and many others. The Maloneys closed the studio in March 2022 to focus on their online music education site Practice Warriors.

=== Charity Work ===
Maloney is the vice president of the charity Peace, Love & Music, Inc., a 501(c)(3) organization founded by his wife, Kristina. In addition to offering scholarships for private music lessons, the charity provides educational clinics and instruments to public school music programs, after-school programs, summer camps and other organization that work with those underserved in their community.

=== Practice Warriors ===
In 2022, Christopher and Kristina Maloney launched their music education site Practice Warriors. The site includes a masterclass on How To Practice Music, hundreds of video lessons covering essential musical skills, interviews with top session players (who have worked with everyone from Thelonious Monk to Katy Perry), interactive Q&A sessions and a membership forum.

== Musical equipment ==
=== Basses/Guitars ===
Maloney had a long affiliation with Linc Luthier Basses, being one of the more high profile bassists to play the unique, high-end instruments. In 2000, Maloney started working with SWR amplifiers after playing through the company's 6x10 Goliath Senior cabinet at the LA jazz club The Baked Potato. In 2007, he started endorsing a variety of Carvin products, including the B5 Bass, mixing board, PA systems and power conditioners. In 2008, Maloney started his affiliation with Fender Musical Instruments by conducting clinics around the US with Cosmosquad, playing at Fender University and performing two years in a row at the annual Bass Bash. In 2009, Maloney switched to D'Addario Strings. For his solo acoustic shows, Maloney has exclusively used his Martin JC16-GTE acoustic guitar.

- Fender – Deluxe V
- Carvin – B5
- Linc Luthier – 4 and 5 string fretted and fretless bass
- Yamaha Electric Guitar
- Martin Acoustic Guitar – JC16-GTE

=== Effects ===
- Digitech – Whammy Pedal
- Digitech – Digital Delay
- Boss – RC-20 Loop Station
- Tech 21 – Sansamp Bass Driver

=== Amplifiers ===
- SWR Goliath SR 6x10
- SWR 350 watt head
- SWR 2x10 extension cabinet
- Fender – Deluxe Reverb

== Discography ==
=== Solo work ===
- Control – 2002
- The Terrors of Intimacy – 2005
- Lost And Found – 2025

=== with Jeff Kollman/Cosmosquad ===
- Bleeding The Soul – 2004
- Guitar Screams Live – 2006
- Acid Test – 2007
- Lights...Camera...SQUAD!! (Live DVD) – 2008

=== Selected discography with other artists ===
- Jacob Armen – Drum Fever – 1994
- Jacob Armen – Breakthrough – 1998
- Jack Avalon – Headnoise – 1999
- Gilli Moon – Temperamental Angel – 2000
- Dweezil Zappa – Automatic – 2000
- Lao Tizer – Golden Soul – 2000
- Jack Avalon – Strange Kind of Light – 2001
- Hardline – II – 2002
- John Taylor – MetaFour – 2002
- Donnie Vie – Just Enough! – 2003
- Lao Tizer – Diversify – 2006
- Debbie Hennessey – Good As Gone – 2006
- Jack Avalon – Six of the Best – 2008
- Arlene Kole – One Day – 2008
- Jami Lula – There's a Healin Goin On – 2009
- Lucero Almazan – One Day – 2018
- Allison Valentine Fernandes - Beacon Of Light - 2020
- Sally Fox Maple - Upswell - 2021
- Keith Calveric - Untold - 2022
