= Life (Hardline album) =

Studio album by Hardline
- Released: April 26, 2019 (International edition); April 17, 2019 (Japanese edition)
- Venue: Italy; United States
- Studio: Ivorytears Music Works, Somma Lombardo; The Box Studio, CT; Tanzan Music, Ospedaletto Lodigiano; Batcave Studios, Panama City Beach, FL
- Genre: Hard rock
- Length: 50:07 (International edition); 55:16 (Japanese edition)
- Label: Frontiers (International edition); Nexus and Seven Seas (Japanese edition)
- Producer: Alessandro Del Vecchio

Hardline chronology
Human Nature (2016)	Life (2019)	Life Live (2020)

Singles from Life
- 1. "Who Wants to Live Forever" Released: February 24, 2019; 2. "Take a Chance" Released: March 7, 2019; 3. "Page of Your Life" Released: April 26, 2019

Professional ratings
Review scores
Source	Rating
Metal Heads Forever	81/100
CD & Festival reviews	7/10 stars

Life is the sixth album by American-Italian hard rock band Hardline. It was released on April 26, 2019 and was produced by Italian multi-instrumentalist Alessandro Del Vecchio via Neapolitan label Frontiers Records with the single Page of Your Life. This is the first album with Italian musicians Mario Percudani on guitar & Marco Di Salvia on drums respectively instead of Josh Ramos and Francesco Jovino.

It was preceded by the release of the singles "Who Wants to Live Forever" (Queen cover) on February 24, 2019, and "Take a Chance" on March 7, 2019.

The first leg of tour dates on their 2019/2020 Life tour began in Italy at the Frontiers Rock Festival with Johnny Gioeli performing an acoustic set on the first night with original Hardline drummer Deen Castronovo and the current lineup performing the following night. The band was touring throughout Europe and Germany but stopped because of the COVID-19 pandemic. These postponed dates were rescheduled to 2021. The album received positive reviews. Hardline released a live CD/DVD from this tour, called "Life Live". It was recorded at Frontiers Rock Festival 2019.

== Track listing ==
All tracks are written by Alessandro Del Vecchio, Mario Percudani and Johnny Gioeli, except where noted.

Life track listing
No.	Title	Writer(s)	Length
1.	"Place to Call Home"		3:34
2.	"Take a Chance"		3:36
3.	"Helio's Sun"		3:42
4.	"Page of Your Life"	Del Vecchio, Gioeli	4:42
5.	"Out of Time"	Del Vecchio, Gioeli	3:53
6.	"Hold on to Right"	Del Vecchio, Gioeli	4:53
7.	"Handful of Sand"		4:23
8.	"This Love"		5:09
9.	"Story of My Life"		3:48
10.	"Who Wants to Live Forever" (originally performed by Queen)	Brian May	3:53
11.	"Chameleon"		5:24
12.	"My Friend"		4:03
Total length:			50:07

Japanese edition bonus track
No.	Title	Length
13.	"This Love" (acoustic version)	5:09

== Personnel ==
- Johnny Gioeli - lead vocals
- Alessandro Del Vecchio - keyboards, backing vocals, producing, recording, mixing, mastering
- Anna Portalupi - bass guitar
- Mario Percudani - guitar, backing vocals
- Marco Di Salvia - drums, backing vocals

=== Additional personnel ===
- Serafino Perugino - executive producing
- Andrea Seveso - studio assistant
- Riccardo Bernardi - pictures
- Stan-W Decker - artwork, layout
