= The White Album (Donnie Vie album) =

Studio album by Donnie Vie
- Released: December 01, 2014
- Genre: Power pop
- Label: Cargo

Donnie Vie chronology
Goodbye: Enough Z'Nuff (2014)	The White Album (2014)	The Best Of Donnie Vie (2015)

The White Album is a double album and the third studio album released by Donnie Vie.

== Track listing ==
=== Disc 1 ===
1. "I Wanna Do It To You"
2. "Handy Dandy"
3. "For Your Pleasure"
4. "Happy Days"
5. "Crash And Burn"
6. "Light Shine On"
7. "Better Love Next Time"
8. "My Love"
9. "When Will You Love Me Again"
10. "Haunted"
11. "Unforsaken"

=== Disc 2 ===
1. "25 Or 6 To 4 (Chicago Cover)"
2. "You're My Favorite Thing To Do"
3. "Almost Home"
4. "Imagine (John Lennon Cover)"
5. "Angel Eyes (Outtake)"
6. "Without You (Outtake)"
7. "Big Brother"
8. "Freaky Deaky"
