= Hardline (band) =

American rock band

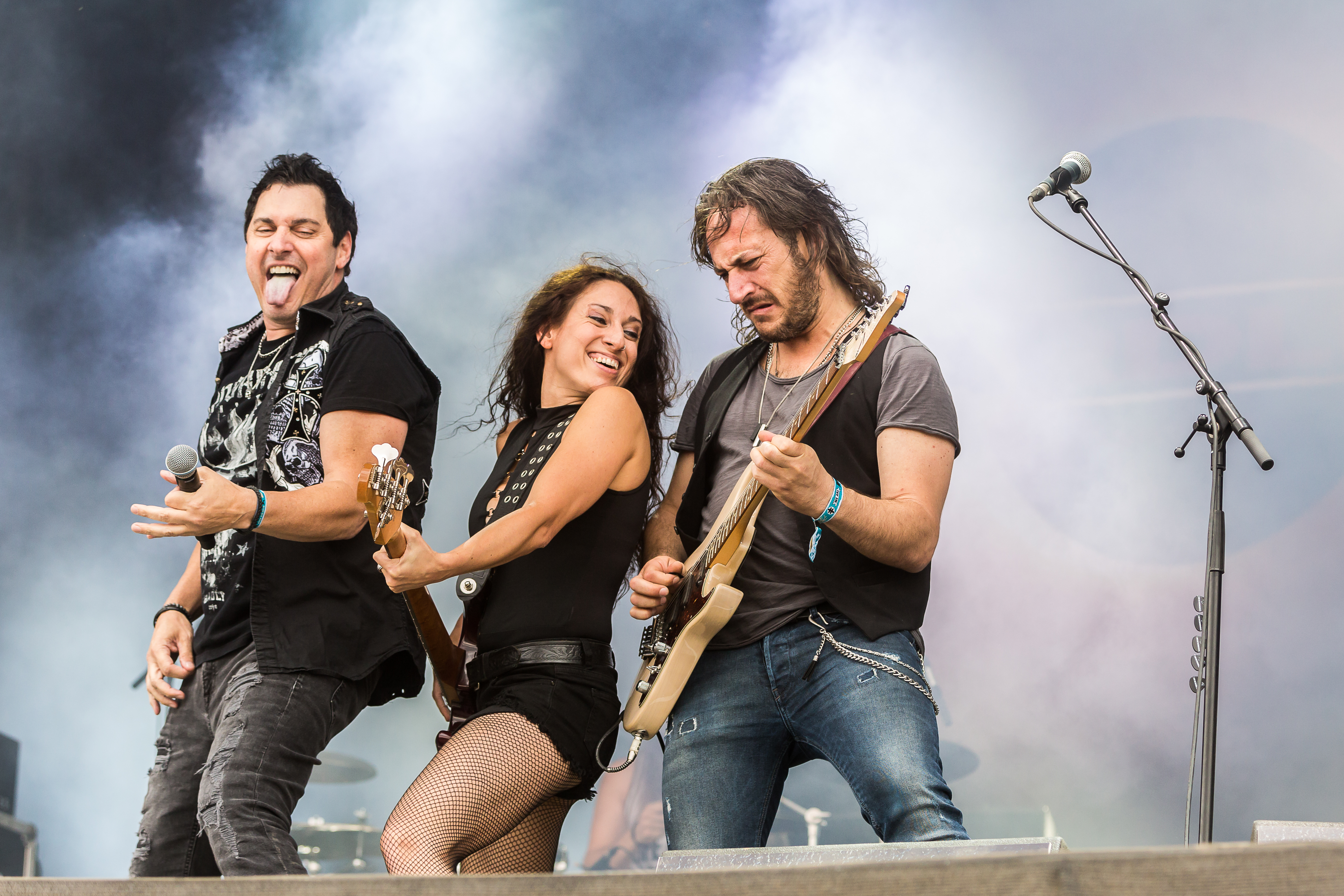
- Hardline performing at Rockharz Open Air 2019 in Germany

Background information
- Origin: Los Angeles, California, U.S.
- Genres: Hard rock; AOR
- Years active: 1991–1992; 1999–2009; 2011–present
- Labels: MCA; Frontiers; SPV
- Members: Johnny Gioeli; Alessandro Del Vecchio; Anna Portalupi; Luca Princiotta; Marco Di Salvia
- Past members: Joey Gioeli; Neal Schon; Deen Castronovo; Todd Jensen; Bobby Rock; Michael T. Ross; Jamie Brown; Atma Anur; Christopher Maloney; Josh Ramos; Bob Burch; Thorsten Koehne; Mario Percudani; Joey Tafolla; Rudy Sarzo; Mike Terrana; Francesco Jovino; Andrea Saveso
- Website: hardlinerocks.com

Hardline is an American-European hard rock band. Originally formed in 1991 by brothers Johnny Gioeli and Joey Gioeli, the band consisted of five members, Johnny Gioeli, Joey Gioeli, Neal Schon, Todd Jensen and Deen Castronovo. The band's most recent album is Shout!, which was released in April 2026. Joey Gioeli has not appeared on a Hardline album since 2002's II, after retiring from music to focus on the family business. Since 2003, Johnny Gioeli is the only remaining original member of the band, while he, bassist Anna Portalupi, and keyboardist/backing vocalist Alessandro Del Vecchio are the longest running members of the band, the latter two having joined in 2011 and have performed in five studio albums since.

== History ==
=== Formation, debut album and first breakup (1991–1992) ===
Hardline is a band created by brothers Johnny Gioeli and Joey Gioeli, who had previously played in the bands Killerhit and Brunette, starred in the unreleased Roman Coppola film 'Smash Crash & Burn' as the band Royal Smash, and later played in the band Gravity, and have since returned to Hardline. The band originally also included guitarist Neal Schon of Journey and Bad English, bassist Todd Jensen (ex-Sequel), and drummer Deen Castronovo. The group's sound was a mainstream commercialized mixture of glam metal and AOR. Two of the group's first songs were played in the movie Rapid Fire which starred Brandon Lee, the son of martial arts expert, Bruce Lee, at the actor's request.

Their debut album Double Eclipse was released on April 28, 1992, and was well received by audiences and had extensive radio airplay at the time. It consisted of many tracks suitable for the album-oriented rock genre. They toured with artists such as Mr. Big and Extreme across America. Several music videos such as "Hot Cherie", "Takin' Me Down", and "Can't Find My Way" were made to promote the album. The Streetheart / Danny Spanos cover of "Hot Cherie" was their most famous performance. The Japanese edition of the album featured the bonus track "Love Leads the Way". Although they mainly performed as opening acts for artists, they did do their own shows too. Plans for a Japan tour were also made but folded after the band broke up in late 1992. Extensive touring in other countries such as Europe were also planned, but again did not materialise after the band's initial break up.

On November 2, 1992, the Hardline song "In the Hands of Time" was played in its entirety during a montage on the "Princess of Tides" episode of the TV serial, Baywatch.

=== Reunion attempts, new line-up and II (1995–2003) ===
After Hardline lost its record deal, Neal Schon departed to begin several projects before finally rejoining Journey. Former Jag Panzer and Shrapnel Records legend Joey Tafolla was approached to join but was unable to participate at the time due to his work schedule, consisting primarily of building his southern California merchandising company. Todd Jensen and Deen Castronovo left to join Ozzy Osbourne's backing band, though Jensen was replaced by Geezer Butler. Eventually, Deen Castronovo also joined Journey.

Drummer Bobby Rock played on Hardline's second album, II. He had previously played several times with the Gioeli brothers in the band Brunette, replacing their regular drummer. They met via Rock's former Vinnie Vincent Invasion bandmate Dana Strum, who produced one of Brunette's demos, on which Rock played some drum tracks. Rock suggested his friend, LA session bassist Christopher Maloney, who had previously worked with Dweezil Zappa, to handle the bass duties on II. Due to Maloney's focus on promoting his solo album Control as well as working with other artists, he was unable to join the band for "The Gods Festival" in Bradford, England in June 2002. Producer Bob Burch played bass at the festival in his stead.

Angel keyboardist Michael T. Ross, a friend to Tafolla, joined the band for II and the live DVD. Former The Storm guitarist Josh Ramos was signed up to play lead guitar for Hardline at "The Gods Festival," and, when Tafolla was unable to finish recording lead guitar for II, was brought in and, in two long, pressure-packed days, laid down all the leads for the album. Johnny Gioeli was displeased with the performance at The Gods festival, and often discredits it. The band tried to revive the original Hardline line up for the performance, but things didn't go to plan. He could not stop the DVD and CDs from being released due to the Frontiers record label's demands, the two bonus tracks "Hypnotised" and "Mercy" were released without his permission. The acoustic version of "Only a Night" is also available on the CD version, which was also an exclusive bonus track from Japan.

=== Changes, Leaving the End Open and second breakup (2009–2010) ===
Hardline's third studio album, Leaving the End Open, was released on April 17, 2009, in Europe and on May 19 in the United States, after much delay. It was originally slated for release in Spring 2006. Recording began in 2004, then under the title "Just Add Water". They initially asked ex Ozzy Osbourne and Quiet Riot bassist Rudy Sarzo to join the band, but he was busy with other projects at the time. Instead, White Fang bassist Jamie Brown took his place, with Atma Anur on drums and returning member Michael T Ross on keyboards. The album could be described as a co-project between Gioeli and Ramos, the latter having contributed significantly to the lyrics and concept of the project. The album's artwork is also the first album cover by the group that doesn't include a reference to their first album, Double Eclipse. Johnny Gioeli expressed interest for touring for this album but plans never materialised, as he was busy touring with Axel Rudi Pell at the time. This line up is one of the only eras of Hardline that never played live on stage with the members of this album.

=== Italian new era with Alessandro Del Vecchio (2011–2025) ===
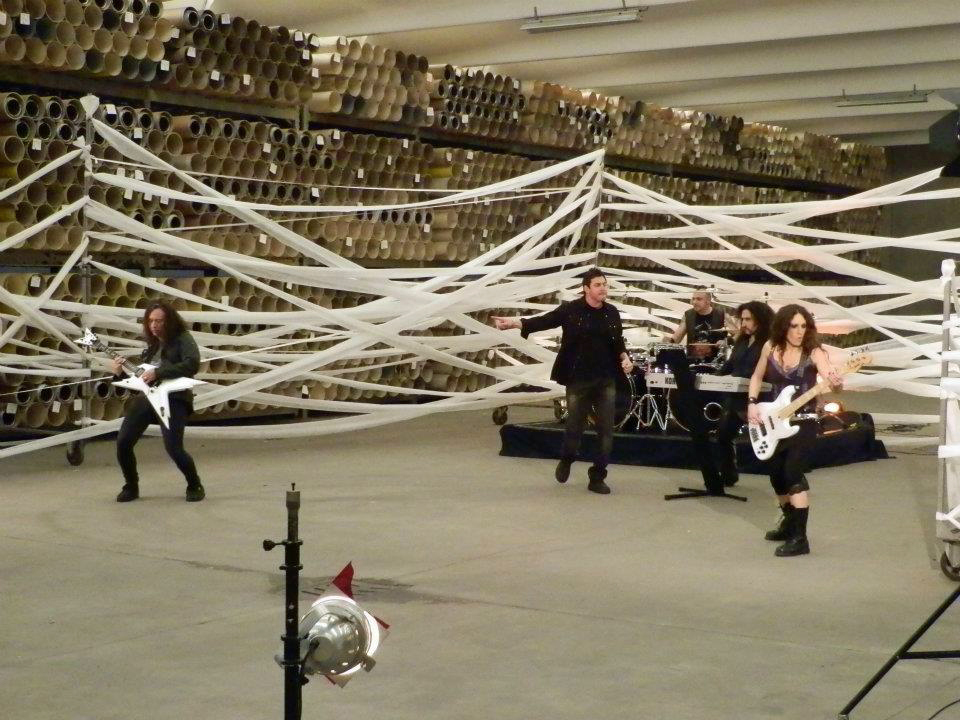
Hardline recording the music video for "Fever Dreams" in 2012

On December 22, 2011, Johnny Gioeli confirmed, via the Frontiers Records official site, that it had been announced that he and Italian keyboard player and producer Alessandro Del Vecchio of Edge of Forever and Eden's Curse would release Hardline's fourth studio album in mid-2012. Entitled Danger Zone, the new album's art features an eclipse to commemorate the twentieth anniversary of the debut album Double Eclipse and was released on May 18, 2012, by Frontiers Records. Del Vecchio commented that he had written the lyrics and music for the album with Gioeli's vocals in mind, and sent demos to Frontiers president Serafino Perugino, who then sent the demos to Gioeli, who immediately became interested in reforming Hardline once again. Music video shooting for the track "Fever Dreams" began on April 15, and the final video was released on May 18. Via Frontiers Records's official electronic press kit for Danger Zone, Johnny Gioeli and Alessandro Del Vecchio announced that "by the time you watch this, we will already be working on the next [album]."

Hardline appeared live, for the first time since "The Gods Festival," at the Sweden Rock Festival on June 7, 2013. Axel Rudi Pell, drummer Mike Terrana, and returning Hardline guitarist Josh Ramos joined the band in place of Thorsten Koehne and Francesco Jovino to play ten songs from all four Hardline albums, notably performing songs from Leaving the End Open and Danger Zone live for the first time. Additionally, Hardline played in person at the tenth anniversary of the Melodic Rock Festival "Firefest" in Nottingham on October 19, 2013, as the headlining band. Drummer Mark Cross stood in for Mike Terrana for the performance, and bass player Nikola Mazzucconi stood in for Anna Portalupi.

On October 14, 2016, Hardline released their fifth album called Human Nature with returning guitarist Josh Ramos, first time performing on a Hardline album since 2009's Leaving the End Open but had been continuously touring with the group since 2013. Human Nature was received quite positively by fans and critics, with offering homages to their 1992 debut album Double Eclipse with a fresh new sound. They performed only 2 shows in 2016, but toured extensively for the new record throughout Europe during 2017. A Japanese edition of Human Nature was also released which includes a special orchestral arrangement of Take You Home. During 2017 their Human Nature tour was changed to the Double Eclipse 25th Anniversary Tour which was also that year, however newer songs from Human Nature were also still performed. These tours were very successful.

On May 6, 2018, it was announced that long time guitarist since 2002, Josh Ramos would leave Hardline, due to conflicts over production reasons and creative differences. Ramos was quickly replaced with the guitarist Mario Percudani who appeared on the Gioeli - Castronovo side project album (which also featured original Hardline member Deen Castronovo on drums & guest vocals) and is now a permanent member. On August 14, 2018, Johnny Gioeli confirmed during a new update video for his Pledgemusic campaign for his upcoming solo album that Hardline were working on their sixth album titled Life, which was eventually released April 26, 2019. It is the first album to feature their new guitarist. It also contains a cover of the Queen song "Who Wants To Live Forever" as Gioeli often exclaims that Freddie Mercury is a huge influence on his voice, and many Hardline fans often compare the two singers that sound alike. The cover was also a dedication to Mercury and Queen. An extensive tour of the Life album followed, which began in 2019 majorly across Europe and Germany, and still continues in 2020, but was halted in the middle of the year due to the COVID-19 pandemic. It is confirmed that the postponed dates will take place in 2021. A forthcoming live CD and DVD set, 'Life [Live]' was recorded and filmed at the Frontiers Rock Festival in 2019 in Milan Italy, featuring tracks from the Life album performed live for the very first time, as well as classics from Double Eclipse, and special guest appearance by Deen Castronovo on drums for certain songs from the Double Eclipse era tracks. Released in February 2020, it will be their first official live recording since the Live at the Gods Festival 2002 CD & DVD release in 2003.

On April 29, 2021, with the first single, "Fuel to the Fire", the band had announced the new studio album, Heart, Mind and Soul, that was released on July 9, 2021, via Frontiers Music SRL.

In April 2022, guitarist Mario Percudani announced his departure from Hardline via Facebook, but left on good terms. Andrea Seveso became his fill in until a permanent member was found. In May 2023, Luca Princiotta (previously a guitarist with Blaze Bayley and Doro) definitively replaced Andrea Seveso on guitar.

Record label and stylistic shift (2025-present)

On April 6, 2025, it was announced that Hardline were working on a new studio album, revealing a departure from their long time record label Frontiers Records, and had re-signed to SPV/Steamhammer (the same record label that releases Axel Rudi Pell albums, another group that also features Gioeli on vocals), with a new album expected to release in early 2026. On April 17, 2026, Shout!, Hardline's eighth studio album released, which is being followed by a supporting tour across Europe. Shout is a noticeable departure from the sound of the previous four albums, being much harder in tone, more akin to Gioeli's work with Axel Rudi Pell, rather than the melodic hard rock/AOR sound used from Danger Zone to Heart, Mind and Soul. The first single, Rise Up, released on February 20th, with the second single, When You Came Into My Life releasing exactly one month later, and the album's titular song Shout releasing as the third single on April 9th, one week before the album dropped.

== Members ==
Hardline live at Rockharz Open Air 2019, Germany

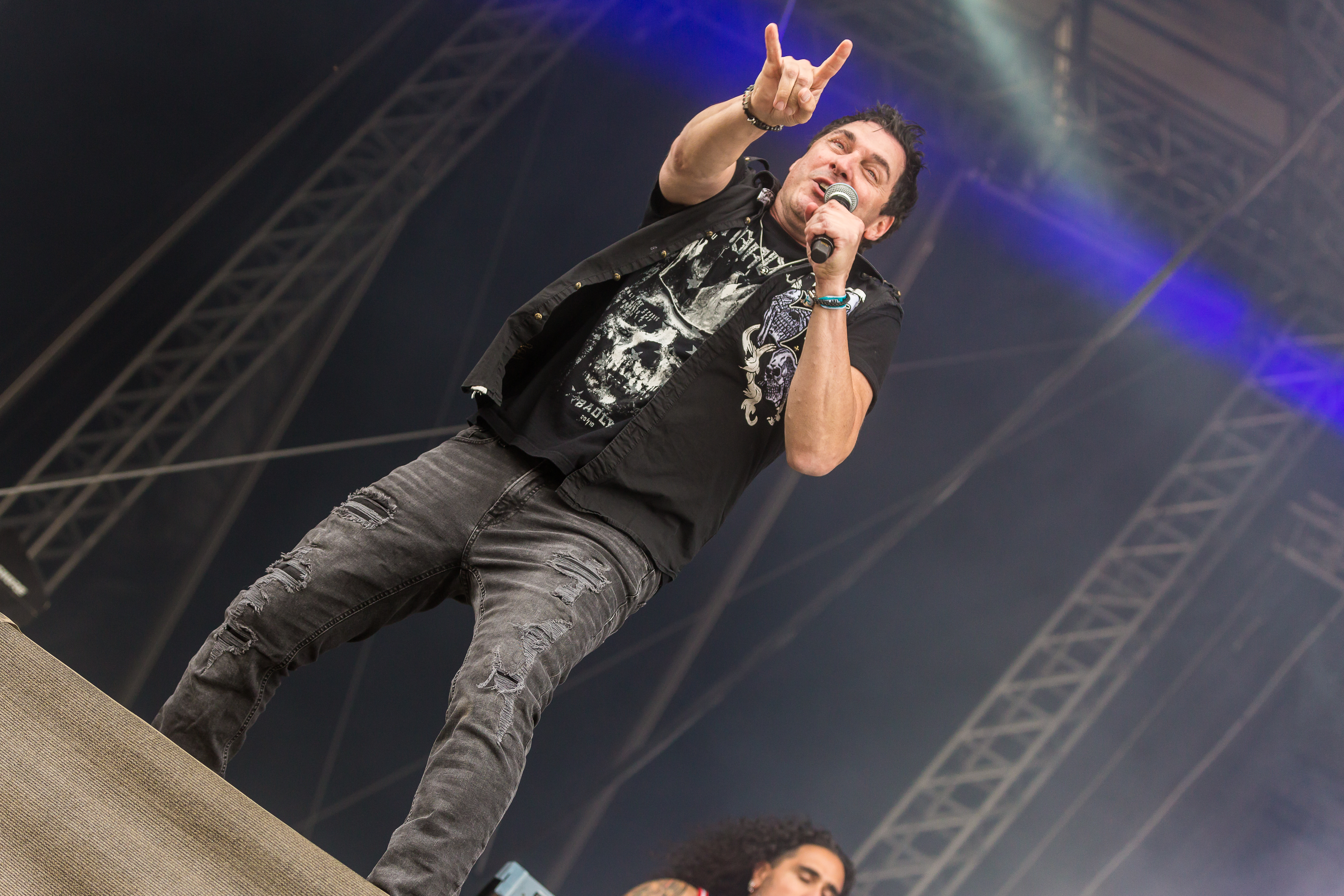
Johnny Gioeli

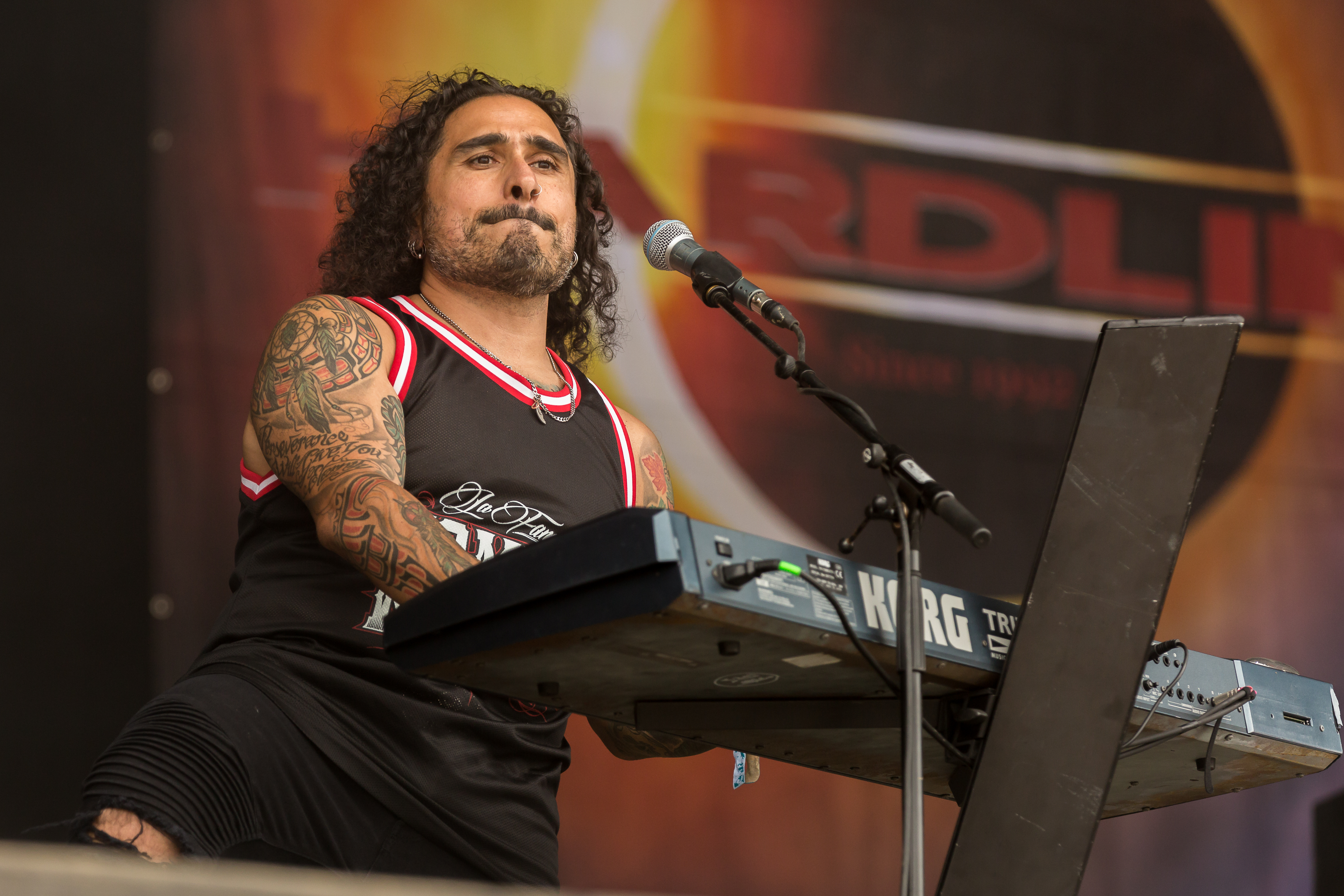
Alessandro Del Vecchio

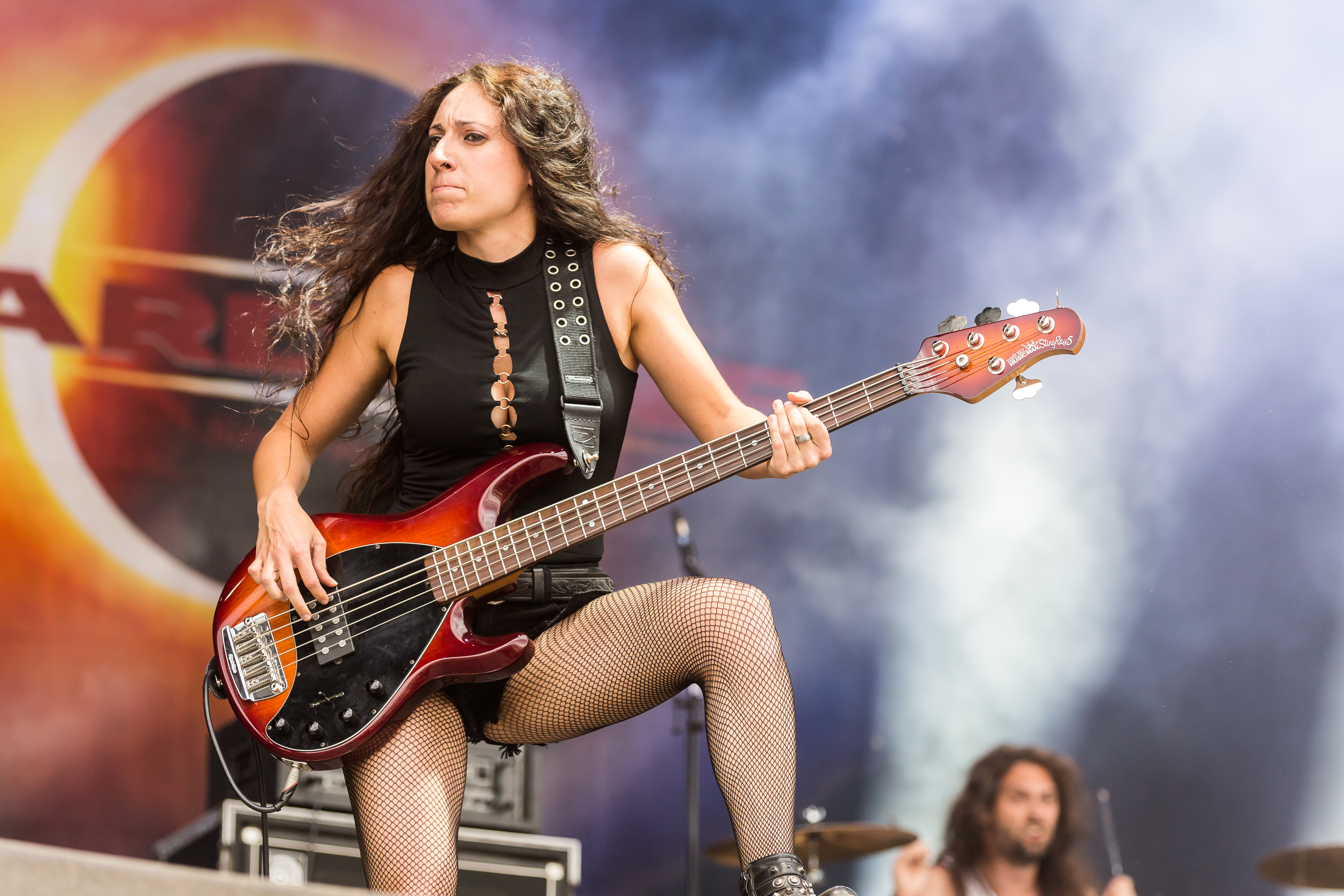
Anna Portalupi

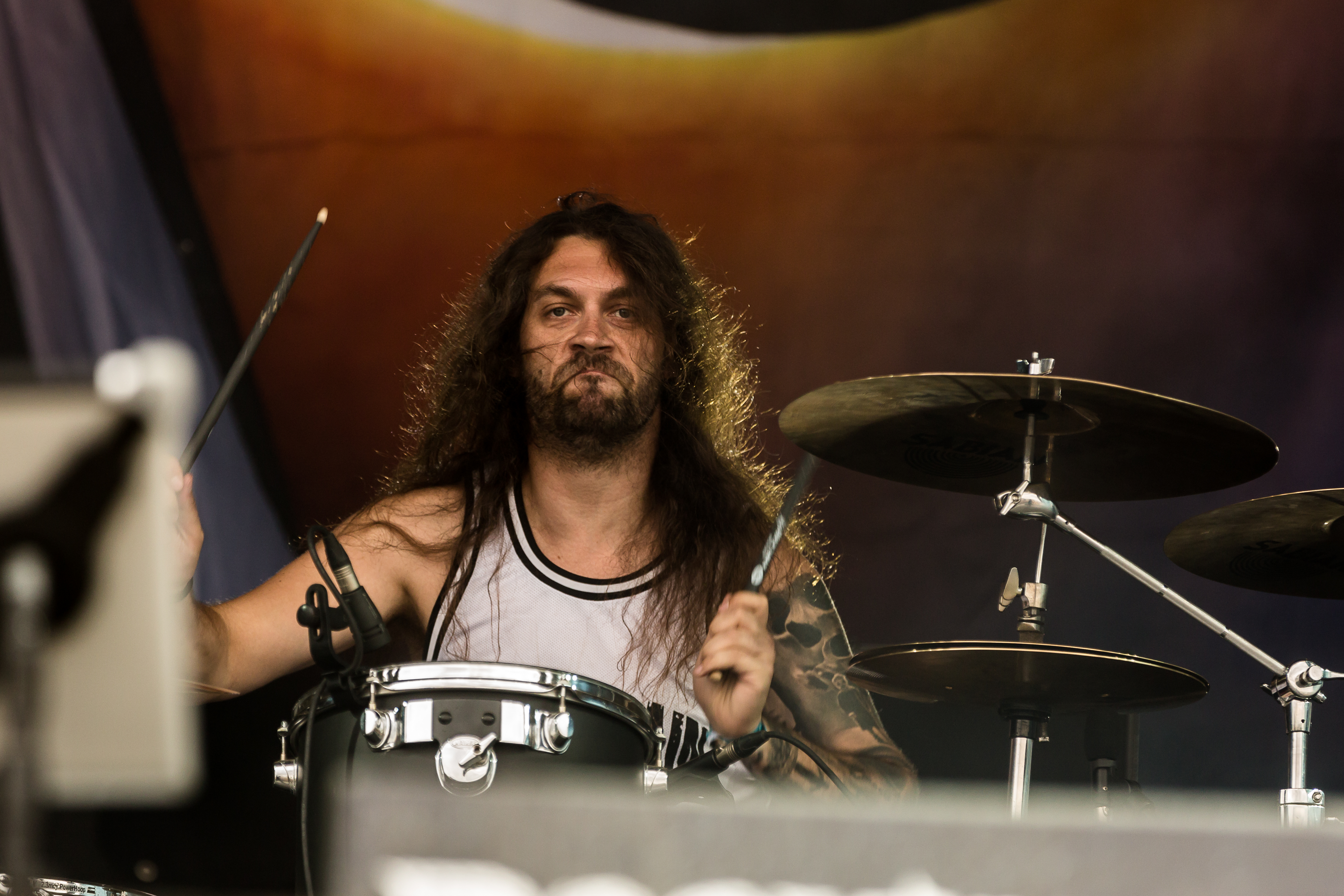
Marco Di Salvia

=== Current members ===
- Johnny Gioeli – vocals (1991–1992, 1999–2009, 2011–present)
- Alessandro Del Vecchio – keyboards, backing vocals (2011–present)
- Anna Portalupi – bass (2011–present)
- Marco Di Salvia – drums (2018–present)
- Luca Princiotta - guitar (2023–present)

=== Former members ===
==== Guitars ====
- Joey Gioeli (1991–1992, 1999–2003)
- Neal Schon (1991–1992)
- Joey Tafolla (2000–2002)
- Josh Ramos (2002–2009, 2012–2018)
- JJ Links (2003–2004)
- Thorsten Koehne (2011–2012)
- Mario Percudani (2019–2022)
- Andrea Seveso (2022–2023)

==== Bass ====
- Todd Jensen (1991–1992)
- Christopher Maloney (2001–2002)
- Bob Burch (2002, live only)
- Rudy Sarzo (2004)
- Jamie Brown (2005–2009)

==== Keyboards ====
- Michael T. Ross (2001–2009)

==== Drums ====
- Deen Castronovo (1991–1992, 2019)
- Bobby Rock (2001–2002)
- Atma Anur (2004–2009)
- Francesco Jovino (2011–2012, 2014–2015, 2016-2018)
- Mike Terrana (2012–2013)
- Matthias Montgomery (2015–2016)

=== Recording timeline ===
| Role | Album | | | | | | | |
| Role | Double Eclipse (1992) | II (2002) | Leaving the End Open (2009) | Danger Zone (2012) | Human Nature (2016) | Life (2019) | Heart, Mind and Soul (2021) | Shout (2026) |
|---|---|---|---|---|---|---|---|---|
| Lead vocals | Johnny Gioeli | Johnny Gioeli | Johnny Gioeli | Johnny Gioeli | Johnny Gioeli | Johnny Gioeli | Johnny Gioeli | Johnny Gioeli |
| Lead guitar | Neal Schon | Josh Ramos | Josh Ramos | Thorsten Koehne | Josh Ramos | Mario Percudani | Mario Percudani | Luca Princiotta |
| Rhythm guitar | Joey Gioeli | Joey Gioeli | Josh Ramos | Thorsten Koehne | Josh Ramos | Mario Percudani | Mario Percudani | Luca Princiotta |
| Bass | Todd Jensen | Christopher T. Maloney | Jamie Brown | Anna Portalupi | Anna Portalupi | Anna Portalupi | Anna Portalupi | Anna Portalupi |
| Keyboards | - | Michael T. Ross | Michael T. Ross | Alessandro Del Vecchio | Alessandro Del Vecchio | Alessandro Del Vecchio | Alessandro Del Vecchio | Alessandro Del Vecchio |
| Drums | Deen Castronovo | Bobby Rock | Atma Anur | Francesco Jovino | Francesco Jovino | Marco Di Salvia | Marco Di Salvia | Marco Di Salvia |

== Discography ==
=== Studio albums ===
- Double Eclipse (1992)
- II (2002)
- Leaving the End Open (2009)
- Danger Zone (2012)
- Human Nature (2016)
- Life (2019)
- Heart, Mind and Soul (2021)
- Shout (2026)

=== Live albums ===
- Live at the Gods Festival 2002 (2003)
- Life Live (2020)
