= A Peacock's Tale =

EP by Magic Eight Ball
- Released: May 15, 2007; April 24, 2012 (re-released)
- Recorded: 2006–2007
- Studios: The Priory; Still Meadow; No Machine Studios
- Genre: Power pop
- Length: 27:18
- Label: Magic Cat Records

Magic Eight Ball chronology
A Peacock's Tale (2007)	Mother Nature's Candy (2011)

A Peacock's Tale is the first studio release by Magic Eight Ball. It's a 4-song EP originally released in 2007, but was later re-released under the band's Magic Cat Records label.

== Background ==
Prior to the formation of Magic Cat Records, the band originally released 'A Peacock's Tale' on CD in 2007 (and later digitally as well with slightly different bonus tracks). The 2012 re-release of the EP on Magic Cat Records was remastered by Dave Draper using one of the original 2007 Neil Sadler mixes and three of Neil's new 2012 remixes.

P.S. The instrumental 'L. N. E. (For The Love Of Three Girls)' has since been renamed and re-recorded as 'Peacocks'.

== Track listing ==
All tracks are written by Baz Francis.

No.	Title	Length
1.	"Baby, Is It So?"	5:00
2.	"Never Need New Genes"	3:33
3.	"Down By The River"	2:52
4.	"L. N. E. (For The Love Of Three Girls)"	2:26

Digital Download Bonus Tracks (No Longer Available)
No.	Title	Length
5.	"Baby, Is It So? (Semi-Acoustic Radio Session)"
6.	"Never Need New Genes (Acoustic Radio Session)"
7.	"Down By The River (Neil Sadler Semi-Acoustic Mix)"
8.	"L. N. E. (For The Love Of Three Girls) (Alternate Version)"

== Personnel ==
=== Musicians ===
- Baz Francis - Vocals, guitars & piano
- Mike Corbyn - Drums
- Robbie J. Holland - Live bass

=== Production ===
- Dave Draper - Remastering for 2012 release at The Panic Room
- Neil Sadler Mixing and engineering at No Machine Studios
- Produced by Neil Sadler, Baz Francis, Mike Corbyn & Robbie J. Holland

=== Art direction ===
- Kate Wilkinson - Design layout by Kate Wilkinson
- Maryhèléna Francis - Illustrations and band photography
- Jeremy Parish - Original CD packaging design
- Baz Francis - Design concept & peacock feathers photograph
- Artwork alterations by Giles Edwards, Jeannine Wyss, Joseph Conlon & Tariq Hussain

=== Additional credits ===
- Remixing of tracks 1, 3 and 4 by Neil Sadler at No Machine Studios, Wokingham, Berkshire, England Remastering of tracks 1–4 by Dave Draper at The Panic Room, Evesham, Worcestershire, England
- Digital bonus tracks 5 and 6 produced by The Bryster at Radio Bronglais, Aberystwyth, Ceredigion, Wales
- Digital bonus track 7 produced by Neil Sadler, Baz Francis and Robbie J. Holland Digital bonus track 8 produced by Baz Francis.
- Initial data transferral on ‘L. N. E. (For The Love Of Three Girls)’ and ‘Baby, Is It So?’ took place at Running Frog Studios (Windsor, Berkshire, England) with a level of primary editing and other studio work being done on the tracks by Neil Thom.
