= Danny Spanos =

American drummer

- Also known as: George Spannos
- Born: South Lyon, Michigan, U.S.
- Genres: Hard rock, rock
- Occupations: Musician, singer
- Instruments: Drums, Vocals
- Years active: 1979–1985
- Formerly of: Redbone

Danny Spanos (also known as George Spannos) was an American rock drummer, best known for his 1983 EP Passion in the Dark which produced the Mainstream Rock Tracks hit single "Hot Cherie" (originally written by members of the Canadian band Streetheart, whose own original recording of the song was not released until 1984) in the summer of 1983. He also had songs on the soundtracks of two movies in 1983–84, Up the Creek used his song "Passion in the Dark", and the Tom Cruise movie All the Right Moves used his song "This Could Be Our Last Chance".

Born and raised in South Lyon, Michigan, Spanos played drums with several groups, including Redbone, known best for their hit song "Come and Get Your Love" in the 1970s. He also played drums on the theme music for the 1970s TV series Starsky and Hutch.

Danny Spanos was arrested in 1984. In early 1985, he released the album Looks Like Trouble, which had disappointing sales, with the only single released, "I'd Lie to You for Your Love" receiving little airplay.

He also filmed a video for the song "Excuse Me" (from Passion in the Dark) which made it into the MTV video rotation in early 1983.

"Hot Cherie" was covered nearly 10 years later by the hard rock/glam metal band Hardline, becoming a minor hit for that group in 1992. "I'd Lie to You for Your Love" was later turned into a country hit by The Bellamy Brothers.

== Discography ==
=== Studio albums ===
| Year | Album details | Chart | |
| Year | Album details | USA 200 | USA Rock |
|---|---|---|---|
| 1980 | Danny Spanos: Released: 1980; Label: Windsong Records | — | — |
| 1983 | Passion in the Dark: Released: 1983; Label: Epic Records | 201 | 15 |
| 1985 | Looks Like Trouble: Released: 1985; Label: Epic Records | 208 | — |
"-" denotes a recording that did not chart or was not released in that territory.

=== Singles ===
| Year | Single | Positions | Album |
| Year | Single | US Main. Rock | Album |
|---|---|---|---|
| 1980 | "One Night Stands" | — | Danny Spanos |
| 1983 | "Hot Cherie" | 15 | Passion in the Dark |
| 1983 | "Excuse Me" | — | Passion in the Dark |
| 1985 | "I'd Lie to You for Your Love" | 42 | Looks Like Trouble |
"—" denotes a recording that did not chart or was not released in that territory.
