= Todd Jensen =

American musician

Todd Jensen is an American bassist who has played for various artists, including the bands Sequel, Hardline, and Harlow, as well as David Lee Roth, Ozzy Osbourne, Steve Perry, Alice Cooper, Paul Rodgers, and Journey.

Todd Jensen played with David Lee Roth in 1991 on the A Little Ain't Enough tour and several Roth tours afterwards, and with Ozzy Osbourne only very briefly, and was replaced by bassist Geezer Butler. Officially, Geezer Butler is credited for all the bass on Ozzmosis, though there have been claims that several uncredited musicians also played on the album, possibly including Todd Jensen. For some time Todd has been David Lee Roth's personal tour manager and was on tour with Van Halen in 2015. In 2021, Todd was asked to play for Journey, while Randy Jackson recovered from back surgery, later becoming an official member shortly after.

== Discography ==
=== With Sequel ===
- Sequel (1982)
- Daylight Fright (1983)
- Back (2007)

=== With Caryl Mack ===
- "Caryl Mack" (1988)

=== With Doro ===
- Doro (1990)
- "A Whiter Shade of Pale" (1995)
- "World Gone Wild" (2015)

=== With Harlow ===
- Harlow (1990)

=== With Hardline ===
- Double Eclipse (1992)

=== With Paul Rodgers ===
- The Hendrix Set (1993)
- Muddy Water Blues: A Tribute to Muddy Waters (1993)
- Paul Rodgers In Concert - 590 (1994)
- The Chronicle (1994)
- Detective at Dawn (2009)

=== Various - Tribute to Deep Purple ===
- Smoke on the Water: A Tribute (1994)

=== With Steve Perry ===
- For the Love of Strange Medicine (1994)

=== With Gunshy ===
- Mayday (1995)

=== With Marc Ferrari & Friends ===
- Guest List (1995)

=== Solo ===
- Dias De Escuela (1996)
- Big Network, Big Music (2008)

=== With Graham Bonnet ===
- Here Comes the Night (1991)
- Underground (1997)

=== With Alice Cooper ===
- A Fistful of Alice (1997)

=== With Jeff Scott Soto ===
- Cover 2 Cover (2005)

=== Nitrate ===
- Feel the Heat (2023)
