= II (Hardline album) =

Studio album by Hardline
- Released: September 23, 2002 (international edition); August 21, 2002 (Japanese edition)
- Genre: Hard rock
- Length: 46:45 (international edition); 50:30 (Japanese edition)
- Label: Frontiers (international edition); Avalon (Japanese edition)
- Producer: Bob Burch

Hardline chronology
Double Eclipse (1992)	II (2002)	Live at the Gods Festival 2002 (2003)

II is the second studio album by the American hard rock band Hardline. It was released in 2002, ten years after the band's debut album Double Eclipse. It is also the last album to feature Joey Gioeli.

The album was originally going to be named either Hyperspace or Vicious Circle, but vocalist Johnny Gioeli decided to change the name simply to II because "it's a natural prosecution of what we started with our debut album Double Eclipse." The tracks "Face the Night," "Do or Die," "Your Eyes," and "This Gift" were originally recorded for Double Eclipse, as Johnny Gioeli revealed in a 2002 interview, "So people are getting a real Hardline record."

It features former The Storm guitarist Josh Ramos.

In a 2002 interview with Andy Read, Johnny Gioeli revealed four songs that were to be included on II: "Plastic Jesus," "Sweet Surrender," "Why Me," which may have been an early demo of "Y," and "Only a Night," the only track among the four confirmed to have appeared on the final product. Gioeli also revealed that he had written two full-length albums, one of which was unused and replaced with what became II. "We actually started writing an album that would've truly been a follow-up to the first Hardline record," Gioeli explained, "It would have been a bit shocking because it was a little outside the box. People don't know that because the second album never came out. Anyway, people at Frontiers heard it and got a little bit nervous and said, 'Keep it like the first record.'"

In an interview with members of Jun Senoue's official fansite at Summer of Sonic 2012, Gioeli elaborated on the differences between Double Eclipse and what would have been an immediate follow up: "So the question is, how different was it going to be? Well, what happened was, we had a meeting with the record company (MCA Records) when we were preparing for that, and then, you know the whole Pearl Jam alternative shit was happening, and the record company said 'Hey look, we know that you guys are talented enough that you can fit in this space as well. So we want to have a bit of an alternative flare.' So, was it completely different? No, but it definitely had a little alternative feel to it. Yeah, it definitely did. I'm trying to recall... basically the difference was, what was happening is a lot of the singers were not using much vibrato." He then demonstrated the difference. "So what we were doing was..." He proceeded to sing part of "I Will Survive" (unreleased) without vibrato. "There it is, that was one of the songs."

== Track listing ==
No.	Title	Writer(s)	Length
1.	"Hold Me Down"	Bob Burch, Johnny Gioeli	4:01
2.	"Y"	Burch, Johnny Gioeli	4:34
3.	"Paralyzed"	Johnny Gioeli, Paul Mirkovich, Marc Tanner	4:52
4.	"Face the Night"	Johnny Gioeli, Joey Gioeli	4:23
5.	"Do or Die"	Burch, Gioeli, Gioeli	4:15
6.	"Hey Girl"	Burch, Gioeli, Gioeli	4:33
7.	"Only a Night"	Gioeli, Gioeli	4:10
8.	"Your Eyes"	Burch, Gioeli, Gioeli	3:35
9.	"Weight"	Johnny Gioeli, Joey Tafolla	3:21
10.	"Way It Is, Way It Goes"	Burch, Johnny Gioeli, Tafolla	5:19
11.	"This Gift"	Johnny Gioeli, Neal Schon	3:39
Total length:			46:45

Japanese edition bonus track
No.	Title	Writer(s)	Length
12.	"Only a Night" (acoustic version)	Gioeli, Gioeli	3:45

== Personnel ==
=== Band members ===
- Johnny Gioeli – vocals, executive producer
- Josh Ramos – lead & rhythm guitar
- Joey Gioeli – rhythm guitar
- Bobby Rock – drums
- Christopher Maloney – bass guitar
- Michael T. Ross – keyboards

=== Additional musicians ===
- Neal Schon – guitar (track 11)

=== Production ===
- Bob Burch – producer, recording, engineering, mixing, arrangement
- Andy Haller – recording, engineer, mixing
- Gary Hoey – mixing
- Mike S. Robinson – executive producer
- Evren Göknar – mastering
