= Donnie Vie =

American singer

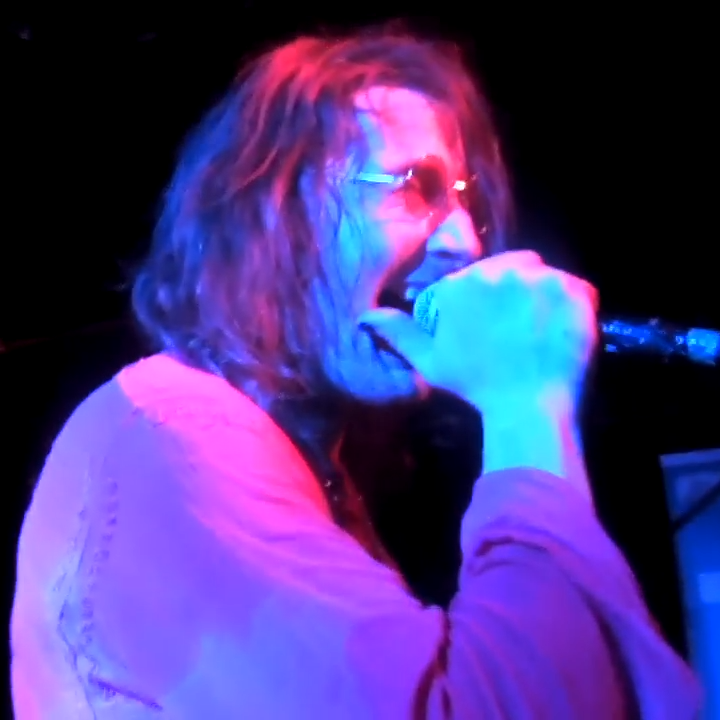

Background information
- Born: Donald Edwin Vandevelde; March 29, 1964 (age 62)
- Genres: Hard rock; power pop; glam metal
- Instruments: Vocals; guitar; acoustic guitar; keyboards; piano; harmonica
- Years active: 1984–present
- Formerly of: V8; Enuff Z'Nuff

Donald Edwin Vandevelde (born March 29, 1964), better known by his stage name Donnie Vie (and occasionally Don E. Vie), is an American musician, singer, and songwriter. He is best known as the main songwriter and lead vocalist of the rock band Enuff Z'Nuff.

== Enuff Z'Nuff ==
Their ATCO Records debut spawned the hits "Fly High Michelle" and "New Thing", both of which charted on Billboard's Mainstream Rock chart. Over their 25-year career, Enuff Z'Nuff has produced a discography of 16 international releases and has played on Late Night with David Letterman. In May 2013, Vie left the band.

== Solo career (2003–present) ==
Vie started his solo career in 2003 with the release of his album Just Enough!. His most recent studio album of new compositions is Beautiful Things. This came out in July 2019 in the U.S. with supporting music videos "Instant Karma" and "Beautiful Things". In October 2021, Vie released the single "Party Time", along with a USB drive compilation of his solo material called The Donnie Vie Collection. In July 2026, Beautiful Things was reissued on Wicked Cool Records. Vie, in collaboration with rapper Jaymac, also released a controversial rap rock single on race relations in 2014 titled "White Nigger", though this has since been removed from online circulation.

== Discography ==
=== Studio albums ===
- Just Enough! (2003)
- Wrapped Around My Middle Finger (2012)
- The White Album (2014)
- Beautiful Things (2019) JPN – #230

=== Compilations and EPs ===
- This & That (2004)
- DVieD-EP (2006)
- Extra Strength (2007)
- Goodbye: Enough Z'Nuff (2014)
- The Best of Donnie Vie (2015)
- ! (2016)
- The Donnie Vie Collection (2021)

=== With Enuff Z'Nuff ===
- Enuff Z'Nuff (1989)
- Strength (1991)
- Animals with Human Intelligence (1993)
- 1985 (1994)
- Tweaked (1995)
- Peach Fuzz (1996)
- Seven (1997)
- Paraphernalia (1999)
- 10 (2000)
- Welcome to Blue Island (2003)
- ? (2004)
- Dissonance (2009)
- Clowns Lounge (2016)
- Brainwashed Generation (2020)
- Never Enuff: Rarities & Demos (2021)

=== With V8 ===
- V8 Live in Europe 2015 (2015)

=== With Guilt N Shame ===
- International Jaggoffs (2018)
