= Resurrection Kings (album) =

Studio album by Resurrection Kings
- Released: January 29, 2016 (International edition); January 20, 2016 (Japanese edition)
- Studio: Ivorytears Music Works, Somma Lombardo, Italy
- Genre: Hard rock; heavy metal
- Length: 51:38 (International edition); 55:26 (Japanese edition)
- Label: Frontiers Records (International edition); Avalon (Japanese edition)
- Producer: Alessandro Del Vecchio

Resurrection Kings chronology
Resurrection Kings (2016)	Skygazer (2021)

Singles from Resurrection Kings
- 1. "Who Did You Run to" Released: November 4, 2015; 2. "Livin' Out Loud" Released: January 21, 2016

Resurrection Kings is the debut album of the international hard rock and metal supergroup Resurrection Kings featuring vocalist Chas West (ex-Bonham, ex-Tribe of Gypsies), guitar player Craig Goldy (Dio, ex-Giuffria), bass player Sean McNabb (Lynch Mob, ex-Dokken, ex-Quiet Riot, ex-Burning Rain) and drummer Vinny Appice (ex-Dio, ex-Black Sabbath, Heaven and Hell).

The album was released on January 29, 2016 and it was produced by Italian multi-instrumentalist Alessandro Del Vecchio (Hardline, Silent Force, ex-Voodoo Circle, Jorn, Edge of Forever, Sunstorm).

The first single “Who Did You Run To” was released on November 4, 2015.

== Track listing ==
No.	Title	Writer(s)	Length
1.	"Distant Prayer"	Alessandro Del Vecchio	4:38
2.	"Livin' Out Loud"	Chas West, Craig Goldy	5:27
3.	"Wash Away"	Del Vecchio, Goldy, Francesco Marras	3:57
4.	"Who Did You Run to"	Del Vecchio	4:46
5.	"Fallin' for You"	Del Vecchio, Goldy	6:16
6.	"Never Say Goodbye"	Del Vecchio, Carmine Martone	5:25
7.	"Path of Love"	Del Vecchio	3:57
8.	"Had Enough"	Del Vecchio, Goldy, Nigel Bailey	5:37
9.	"Don't Have to Fight No More"	Del Vecchio	4:39
10.	"Silent Wonder"	Del Vecchio, Goldy	3:33
11.	"What You Take"	Dan Baldrich	3:23
Total length:			51:38

Japanese edition bonus track
No.	Title	Writer(s)	Length
13.	"Never Say Goodbye" (acoustic version)	Del Vecchio, Martone	4:48

== Personnel ==
- Chas West – lead vocals
- Craig Goldy – guitar, arrangement
- Sean McNabb – bass guitar
- Vinny Appice – drums

=== Additional personnel ===
- Alessandro Del Vecchio – keyboards, backing vocals, arrangement, production, mixing, mastering
- Serafino Perugino – executive producer
