= Revolution Saints (album) =

Studio album by Revolution Saints
- Released: February 18, 2015
- Studios: Black Diamond Studio, Portland, Oregon, United States; The Cork and Bottle Studio, Sonoma County, California, United States; Elvis Presley's Backstage Bar Studio, Las Vegas, Nevada, United States; CasaDALA, Sherman Oaks, California; Ivorytears Music Works, Somma Lombardo, Italy; ONQ Studio, Manila, Philippines; Fantasy Studio, Berkeley, California, United States
- Genres: Hard rock; pop rock
- Length: 53:16
- Label: Frontiers Records
- Producer: Alessandro Del Vecchio

Revolution Saints chronology
Revolution Saints (2015)	Light in the Dark (2017)

Singles from Revolution Saints
- 1. "Turn Back Time" Released: December 9, 2014; 2. "Way To The Sun" Released: January 23, 2015; 3. "Back On My Trail" Released: February 6, 2015; 4. "Here Forever" Released: February 18, 2015

Revolution Saints is the debut album of the American rock supergroup Revolution Saints featuring vocalist/drummer Deen Castronovo of Journey, formerly of The Dead Daisies, Bad English, and Hardline; guitar player Doug Aldrich of The Dead Daisies and Burning Rain, formerly of Dio and Whitesnake; and vocalist/bass player Jack Blades of Night Ranger.

The album was produced by Italian multi-instrumentalist Alessandro Del Vecchio (Hardline, Silent Force, formerly of Voodoo Circle).

== Track listing ==
Revolution Saints track listing
No.	Title	Writer(s)	Length
1.	"Back on My Trail"	Alessandro Del Vecchio	4:17
2.	"Turn Back Time"	Del Vecchio (music), Jack Blades (lyrics)	4:17
3.	"You're Not Alone" (feat. Arnel Pineda)	Del Vecchio	5:09
4.	"Locked Out of Paradise"	Del Vecchio	3:52
5.	"Way to the Sun" (feat. Neal Schon)	Del Vecchio	5:00
6.	"Dream On"	Erik Mårtensson, Johan Becker, Kristofer Becker (music); Mårtensson, J. Becker, K. Becker, Del Vecchio, Blades (lyrics)	3:17
7.	"Don't Walk Away"	Del Vecchio	5:36
8.	"Here Forever" (Originally recorded by Francesco Renga)	Francesco Renga, Luca Chiaravalli (music); Renga (lyrics); Del Vecchio (translation)	4:06
9.	"Strangers to This Life"	Christian Wolff, Fredrik Bergh, Mårtensson (music); Del Vecchio (lyrics)	4:40
10.	"Better World"	Magnus Karlsson (music), Del Vecchio (lyrics)	4:30
11.	"How to Mend a Broken Heart" (Originally recorded by Eclipse)	Mårtensson, Magnus Henriksson (music); Mårtensson (lyrics)	3:32
12.	"In the Name of the Father (Fernando's Song)"	Del Vecchio, Peter Alpenborg (music); Del Vecchio (lyrics)	5:00
Total length:			53:16

Deluxe Edition Bonus Tracks
No.	Title	Writer(s)	Length
13.	"You're Not Alone" (Arnel Pineda version)	Del Vecchio	5:14
14.	"Way to the Sun" (Doug Aldrich version)	Del Vecchio	5:04
15.	"You're Not Alone" (Deen Castronovo version)	Del Vecchio	5:13

Japanese Edition Bonus Tracks
No.	Title	Writer(s)	Length
13.	"Don't Walk Away" (Acoustic version)	Del Vecchio	5:23
14.	"You're Not Alone" (Arnel Pineda version)	Del Vecchio	5:14
15.	"Way to the Sun" (Doug Aldrich version)	Del Vecchio	5:04
16.	"You're Not Alone" (Deen Castronovo version)	Del Vecchio	5:13

== Personnel ==
- Deen Castronovo – drums, lead & backing vocals
- Jack Blades – bass guitar, backing vocals, co-lead vocals on "Turn Back Time" and "Way to the Sun"
- Doug Aldrich – guitars

=== Additional personnel ===
- Alessandro Del Vecchio – keyboards, backing vocals, vocals on "Way to the Sun", production, mixing, mastering
- Arnel Pineda – co-lead vocals on "You're Not Alone"
- Neal Schon – guitar solo on "Way to the Sun"
- Massimo 'Defender' Moretti – additional drum fills
- Serafino Perugino – executive producer
