= Set the World on Fire (Gioeli-Castronovo album) =

Studio album by Gioeli-Castronovo
- Released: July 13, 2018 (International edition); July 25, 2018 (Japanese edition)
- Venue: Italy
- Studio: Ivorytears Music Works, Somma Lombardo
- Genre: Hard rock
- Length: 47:57 (International edition); 50:58 (Japanese edition)
- Label: Frontiers Records (International edition); Nexus and Seven Seas (Japanese edition)
- Producer: Alessandro Del Vecchio

Singles from Set the World on Fire
- 1. "Through" Released: May 4, 2018; 2. "Set The World on Fire" Released: June 19, 2018; 3. "Need You Now" Released: August 7, 2018; 4. "Who I Am" Released: August 17, 2018; 5. "Remember Me" Released: October 30, 2018

Set the World on Fire is the first album of collaboration between Hardline vocalist Johnny Gioeli (Axel Rudi Pell, Crush 40) and drummer/vocalist Deen Castronovo (Revolution Saints, The Dead Daisies, ex-Ozzy Osbourne, ex-Steve Vai, ex-Hardline, ex-Bad English, ex-Journey).

Gioeli and Castronovo first played together on the debut Hardline album Double Eclipse in 1992. 25 years later they reunited with Italian songwriter Alessandro Del Vecchio that produced this debut album for Frontiers Records.

== Track listing ==
No.	Title	Writer(s)	Length
1.	"Set the World on Fire"	Alessandro Del Vecchio	3:30
2.	"Through"	Del Vecchio	4:06
3.	"Who I am"	Del Vecchio	3:00
4.	"Fall Like an Angel"	Del Vecchio, Marco Sivo, Pete Alpenborg	3:37
5.	"It's All About You"	Del Vecchio, Sivo, Alpenborg	4:33
6.	"Need You Now" (featuring Giorgia Colleluori – Originally performed by Lady Antebellum)	Charles Kelley, Dave Haywood, Hillary Scott, Josh Kear	3:54
7.	"Ride of Your Life"	Jim Peterik	3:53
8.	"Mother" (Originally performed by Anna Tatangelo)	Del Vecchio, Gigi D'Alessio	3:54
9.	"Walk with Me"	Del Vecchio	3:50
10.	"Run for Your Life"	Del Vecchio, Nigel Bailey, Steve Overland	4:53
11.	"Remember Me"	Del Vecchio, Bailey	4:22
12.	"Let Me Out"	Hayden Bell, Jessica Origliasso, Lisa Origliasso, Martin Hansen, Sarah Lundback Bell	4:25
Total length:			47:57

Japanese edition bonus track
No.	Title	Writer(s)	Length
13.	"Who I am" (acoustic version)	Del Vecchio	3:01
Total length:			50:58

== Personnel ==
- Johnny Gioeli – Lead vocals
- Deen Castronovo – Lead vocals, drums
- Alessandro Del Vecchio – Keyboards, backing vocals, producing, recording, mixing, mastering
- Mario Percudani – Guitar
- Nik Mazzucconi – Bass

=== Additional personnel ===
- Giorgia Colleluori – Lead vocals on "Need You Now"
- Manato Raoul Christian Navarro – additional Acoustic guitars on "Need You Now"
- Serafino Perugino – Executive producer

== Reception ==
CrypticRock rated Set The World On Fire 5 out of 5 stars. Classic Rock Revisited rated the album "A+".
