= Dreamtide =

German hard rock band

Dreamtide is a German hard rock band. The group has released four albums, two of which on Italian label Frontiers Records.

It was founded by Helge Engelke of the band Fair Warning together with Ole Hempelman und Olaf Senkbeil and Fair Warning live keyboardist Torsten Lüderwaldt.

Their debut album Here Comes the Flood came out in late 2001. It received a 7.5/10 score from Rock Hard.

Dreams For The Daring followed in 2003, and received a strong 9/10 score from Rock Hard.

Their third album Dream and Deliver from 2008 was called "melodic rock at its finest" and "of the highest level" by Vampster. Powermetal.de called it "consistently well-crafted". Francis Buchholz played the bass on this album.

After many years of not releasing any material, Drama Dust Dream came out on the Pride & Joy label in 2022. Ratings were moderate to good, spanning from 7/10 in Rock Hard to 3/6 in Scream Magazine. Founding member Helge Engelke died in 2023.

== Discography ==
- Here Comes the Flood (2001)
- Dreams for the Daring (2003)
- Dream and Deliver (2008)
- Drama Dust Dream (2003)
