= Giuntini Project III =

Studio album by Giuntini Project
- Released: 28 April 2006
- Genre: Hard rock, heavy metal
- Length: 58:43
- Label: Frontiers
- Producer: Dario Mollo

Giuntini Project chronology
Giuntini Project II (1999)	Giuntini Project III (2006)	Giuntini Project IV (2013)

Professional ratings
Review scores
Source	Rating
Metal Temple	7/10 stars
Melodic Net	3/5 stars
Hard Rock Haven	7.9/10 stars

Giuntini Project III is the third album from Italian guitarist Aldo Giuntini's solo band and the second to feature former Black Sabbath singer Tony Martin on vocals. It was released on 28 April 2006 and was produced by Dario Mollo.

== Track listing ==
All tracks are written by Aldo Giuntini & Tony Martin, except where indicated

No.	Title	Writer(s)	Length
1.	"Gold Digger"		3:09
2.	"Not Connected"		3:19
3.	"Que es la vida"		5:32
4.	"Early Warning"		4:28
5.	"Fool Paradise"		3:40
6.	"Tutmosis IV – Tarantula" (Instrumental)	Dario Patti	5:02
7.	"Anno Mundi (The Vision)" (Black Sabbath cover)	Tony Iommi, Martin, Neil Murray, Cozy Powell, Geoff Nicholls	6:13
8.	"Disfunctional Kid"		3:41
9.	"Mourning Star"		4:43
10.	"Trouble Just Keeps Coming"		4:55
11.	"The Closest Thing to Heaven"		5:07
12.	"Memories in the Sand" (Instrumental)		4:46
13.	"Tarot Warrior"		4:08

Japanese edition bonus track
No.	Title	Length
14.	"You Don't Rock My Soul"

== Personnel ==
Band members

- Aldo Giuntini – guitar
- Tony Martin – vocals
- Fulvio Gaslini – bass
- Ezio Secomandi – drums
- Dario Patti – keyboards
- Fabiano Rizzi – drums on "Memories in the Sand"

Production

- Produced, engineered and mastered by Dario Mollo
- Cover design: Giulio Cataldo
- Photography: Emmanuel Mathez
