= The Cage 2 =

Studio album by Tony Martin/Dario Mollo
- Released: 22 May 2002 (Europe/Japan)
- Recorded: 2001
- Genre: Hard rock
- Length: 61:09
- Label: Frontiers Records
- Producer: Dario Mollo

Tony Martin/Dario Mollo chronology
The Cage (1999)	The Cage 2 (2002)	The Third Cage (2012)

The Cage 2 a 2002 album by guitarist Dario Mollo and former Black Sabbath vocalist Tony Martin. It is their second collaboration.

== Track listing ==
All tracks are written by Dario Mollo/Tony Martin unless stated otherwise

No.	Title	Writer(s)	Length
1.	"Terra Toria"		3:44
2.	"Overload"		4:46
3.	"Life Love and Everything"		5:04
4.	"The Balance of Power"		5:01
5.	"Amore Silenzioso"		6:18
6.	"II" (instrumental)	Mollo	2:07
7.	"Wind of Change"		5:44
8.	"Theater of Dreams"		5:54
9.	"What a Strange Thing Love Is"		4:30
10.	"Dazed and Confused" (Jake Holmes cover, popularized by Led Zeppelin)	Holmes, Page	6:30
11.	"Guardian Angel"		4:29
12.	"Poison Roses"		6:56

Japanese edition bonus track
No.	Title	Writer(s)	Length
12.	"Over A" (instrumental)	Mollo	4:32

== Personnel ==
Band members

- Tony Martin – vocals
- Dario Mollo – guitar
- Tony Franklin – bass
- Roberto Gualdi – drums
- Dario Patti – keyboards

Additional performer

- Walter Ruta – didjeridoo

Production

- Dario Mollo – production, engineering, mastering and mixing
- Saverio Chippalone – photography
