= Rise (Revolution Saints album) =

Studio album by Revolution Saints
- Released: January 24, 2020
- Studio: Ivorytears Music Works, Somma Lombardo, Italy; Casa Dala, Louisiana and Ranch Rock Studio, Washington, United States
- Genre: Hard rock
- Length: 47:12 (International edition); 56:10 (Japanese edition)
- Label: Frontiers (International edition); Nexus and Seven Seas (Japanese edition)
- Producer: Alessandro Del Vecchio

Revolution Saints chronology
Light in the Dark (2017)	Rise (2020)	Eagle Flight (2023)

Singles from Rise
- 1. "When the Heartache Has Gone" Released: December 12, 2019; 2. "Closer" Released: January 10, 2020; 3. "Price We Pay" Released: January 24, 2020; 4. "Talk to Me" Released: January 30, 2020; 5. "Coming Home" Released: April 3, 2020

Rise is the third album by American supergroup Revolution Saints. It was released on January 24, 2020, via Neapolitan label Frontiers and it was produced by Italian multi-instrumentalist Alessandro Del Vecchio, also involved songwriting, keyboards and backing vocals, as in the two previous albums.

This album includes the ex-Night by Night singer Dan Rossall as a songwriter.

The first single released was When the Heartache Has Gone on December 12, 2019, followed by Closer on January 10, 2020.

== Track listing ==
Rise track listing
No.	Title	Writer(s)	Length
1.	"When the Heartache Has Gone"	Dan Rossall, Alessandro Del Vecchio, Doug Aldrich	4:40
2.	"Price We Pay"	Del Vecchio	4:14
3.	"Rise"	Rossall, Del Vecchio, Aldrich	3:54
4.	"Coming Home"	Del Vecchio	4:39
5.	"Closer"	Del Vecchio	4:08
6.	"Higher"	Jack Blades, Aldrich, Rossall, Del Vecchio	5:07
7.	"Talk to Me" (featuring Luna Akire)	Del Vecchio	4:19
8.	"It's Not the End (It's Just the Beginning)"	Blades	5:03
9.	"Million Miles"	Del Vecchio, Aldrich	3:28
10.	"Win or Lose"	Del Vecchio, Rossall	4:00
11.	"Eyes of a Child"	Blades, Tommy Shaw	3:32
Total length:			47:12

Japanese edition bonus tracks
No.	Title	Writer(s)	Length
12.	"Coming Home" (acoustic version)	Del Vecchio	4:39
13.	"Talk to Me" (Deen's vocal version)	Del Vecchio	4:19

Japanese edition bonus DVD
No.	Title	Length
1.	"When the Heartache Has Gone" (music video)
2.	"Price We Pay" (music video)
3.	"Talk to Me" (B-roll video)
4.	"Photo gallery"

== Personnel ==
- Deen Castronovo – vocals, drums
- Doug Aldrich – guitars
- Jack Blades – bass guitar, vocals

=== Additional personnel ===
- Alessandro Del Vecchio – producing, recording, mixing, mastering, keyboards, backing vocals
- Serafino Perugino – executive producer
- Luna Akire – vocals on "Talk to Me"
- Andrea Seveso – studio assistant
- Oleg "Voodoo" Shcherbakov – artwork, layout, design

== Charts ==
Sales chart performance for Rise
Chart (2020)	Peak position
Belgian Albums (Ultratop Wallonia)	188
German Albums (Offizielle Top 100)	61
Swiss Albums (Schweizer Hitparade)	18

== See also ==
- List of 2020 albums
