= Sundancer (album) =

Studio album by Fair Warning
- Released: 2013
- Recorded: 2011–2012
- Genre: Hard rock, melodic rock
- Length: 66:07
- Label: SPV/Steamhammer
- Producer: Fair Warning

Fair Warning chronology
Aura (2009)	Sundancer (2013)

SUNDANCER is the seventh full-length studio album released by German melodic hard rock band Fair Warning. The album was recorded in 2011 thru 2012 with final mixing and production concluding in early 2013. The CD was released in Japan in April, 2013 and subsequently released in Europe and The United States in May and June 2013 respectfully. As with their previous release, 2009's Aura, the band recorded as a four-piece with Tommy Heart (vocals), Helge Engelke (guitars), Ule W. Ritgen (bass) and C.C. Behrens (drums).

== Recording ==
While Ule Ritgen and Helge Engelke were the primary individual songwriters for Fair Warning's first six studio offerings, SUNDANCER has three tracks that were collectively written by the band. Ritgen said: "This approach was new to us and it was certainly accompanied by one or two doubts, because you never know if something like that is going to work out. But, to our own surprise, we had an incredible amount of fun, resulting in three excellent songs." Engelke said of the process "Three of the songs on “Sundancer” we wrote together. We never did it before but it turned out to be a nice experience resulting in good songs. The rest of the songs are written by Ule or me like on all the previous albums."

== Touring and promotion ==
Fair Warning supported SUNDANCER with a brief tour of Japan with concerts in Tokyo, Nagoya and Osaka in July, 2013. The band enlisted Niklas Turmann (guitar) and Torsten Luederwaldt (keyboards) to supplement the live performances. In mid May, 2013, to promote the new album, record company Steamhammer/SPV, (SPV GmbH) posted the song "Hit and Run" on SoundCloud.

== Track listing ==
1. "Troubled Love" – 4:25 b
2. "Keep it in the Dark" – 4:54 c
3. "Real Love" – 5:07 a
4. "Hit and Run" – 3:42 c
5. "Man in the Mirror" – 3:58 b
6. "Natural High" – 3:28 b
7. "Jealous Heart" – 4:54 a
8. "Touch my Soul" – 4:48 b
9. "Send me a Dream" – 5:00 b
10. "Pride" – 4:21 c
11. "Get Real" – 4:02 c
12. "How does it Feel" – 5:07 a
13. "Living on the Streets" – 4:00 b
14. "Cool" - 3:28 c
15. "Just as She Smiles" (Bonus Track) – 4:53

Song credits:

- a. Music by Engelke, Heart, Ritgen / Lyrics by Ritgen
- b. Music and Lyrics by Ritgen
- c. Music and Lyrics by Engelke

== Personnel ==
- Tommy Heart – Vocals
- Helge Engelke – Guitars / Keyboards / Backing Vocals
- Ule W. Ritgen – Bass / Backing Vocals
- C.C. Behrens – Drums
