= Get a Little Closer =

Get a Little Closer may refer to

== Albums ==
- Get a Little Closer, by Ricky Lynn Gregg, or the title song (1994)

== Songs ==
- "Get a Little Closer", by Joe from Everything (1993)
- "Get a Little Closer", by Fair Warning from Rainmaker (1995)
- "Get a Little Closer", by Nazia and Zoheb (1982)
- "Get a Little Closer", by M. Pokora from Mise à jour (2010)
- "Get a Little Closer", by Pretty Ricky from Bluestars (2005)
