= Raised on Rock (Voodoo Circle album) =

Studio album by Voodoo Circle
- Released: 9 February 2018 (International and limited edition); 21 March 2018 (Japanese edition)
- Studios: H-Factor Studio, Hanover, Germany; Tronical Studio, Hamburg, Germany; Studio Le Chalet, Reims, France; Ivorytears Music Works Recording Studio, Somma Lombardo, Italy
- Genres: Hard rock; blues rock
- Length: 50:33 (International edition); 61:15 (limited edition); 65:05 (Japanese edition)
- Labels: AFM Records (International and limited edition); Avalon (Japanese edition)
- Producers: Alex Beyrodt; Mat Sinner

Voodoo Circle chronology
Whisky Fingers (2015)	Raised on Rock (2018)	Locked & Loaded

Singles from Raised on Rock
- 1. "Running Away from Love" Released: 15 December 2017; 2. "Higher Love" Released: 26 January 2018

Professional ratings
Review scores
Source	Rating
Brave Words & Bloody Knuckles	7.6/10 stars
Get Ready to Rock!	3/5 stars
Ghost Cult Magazine	6/10 stars
Metal Express Radio	7.6/10 stars
Metal Hammer Italia	7.6/10 stars
Metal Heads Forever	3/5 stars
Metal Temple	8.25/10 stars
Wimps and Posers	4.5/5 stars

Raised on Rock is the fifth album by rock band Alex Beyrodt's Voodoo Circle. It was released on 9 February 2018 via AFM Records and it was produced by Alex Beyrodt itself with the collaboration of bass guitarist Mat Sinner. This is the first album with new lead singer Herbie Langhans (Avantasia) instead of David Readman (Pink Cream 69) and the former Italian keyboardist/vocalist Alessandro Del Vecchio co-wrote one track and a bonus for limited and Japanese edition.

The album was preceded by the singles "Running Away from Love" on 15 December 2017 and "Higher Love" on 26 January 2018.

== Track listing ==
All songs are written by Alex Beyrodt, Herbie Langhans and Mat Sinner unless otherwise noted.

No.	Title	Writer(s)	Length
1.	"Running Away from Love"		3:58
2.	"Higher Love"		4:08
3.	"Walk On the Line"		4:51
4.	"You Promised Me Heaven"		4:46
5.	"Just Take My Heart"		3:22
6.	"Where Is the World We Love"		5:10
7.	"Ultimate Sin"	Beyrodt, Langhans, Alessandro Del Vecchio, Sinner	4:03
8.	"Chase Me Away"		5:22
9.	"Unknown Stranger"		3:25
10.	"Dreamchaser"		6:38
11.	"Love Is an Ocean"	Beyrodt, Conny Welén, Sinner	4:50
Total length:			50:33

Limited edition bonus tracks
No.	Title	Writer(s)	Length
12.	"Time For The Innocent"	Beyrodt, Langhans, Del Vecchio, Sinner	5:42
13.	"Ther's More to See"		4:13

Japanese edition bonus tracks
No.	Title	Writer(s)	Length
12.	"Time For The Innocent"	Beyrodt, Langhans, Del Vecchio, Sinner	5:42
13.	"Ther's More to See"		4:13
14.	"Heart of Stone (2017 version)"	Del Vecchio, Beyrodt, David Readman, Sinner	3:54

== Personnel ==
=== Voodoo Circle ===
- Herbie Langhans - vocals
- Alex Beyrodt - guitar, producing
- Mat Sinner - bass guitar, co-producing
- Francesco "Cesco" Jovino* - drums

=== Additional personnel ===
- Corvin Bahn - organ, keyboards
- Jacob Hansen - mixing, mastering
- Hiko - artwork
- Barandash Karandashich - graphics
- Alex Kuehr - photos
