= Light in the Dark (Revolution Saints album) =

Studio album by Revolution Saints
- Released: October 13, 2017
- Recorded: Early 2017
- Studio: Ivorytears Music Works, Somma Lombardo, Italy; CasaDala, Sherman Oaks, California, United States
- Genre: Hard rock; pop rock
- Length: 51:04; 71:04 (Deluxe Edition)
- Label: Frontiers
- Producer: Alessandro Del Vecchio

Revolution Saints chronology
Revolution Saints (2015)	Light in the Dark (2017)	Rise (2020)

Singles from Light in the Dark
- 1. "Light in the Dark" Released: July 21, 2017; 2. "Freedom" Released: August 18, 2017; 3. "I Wouldn't Change A Thing" Released: September 18, 2017; 4. "Take You Down" Released: October 6, 2017

Light in the Dark is the second album of the American rock supergroup Revolution Saints.

The album was produced by Italian Alessandro Del Vecchio, involved on songwriting, on keyboards and backing vocals also.

The Light in the Dark Deluxe Edition has 4 bonus live tracks recorded in Milan at Frontiers Rock Festival on April 29, 2017.

The title track was the first single that came out on July 21.

== Track listing ==
Light in the Dark track listing
No.	Title	Writer(s)	Length
1.	"Light in the Dark"	Alessandro Del Vecchio, Deen Castronovo, Doug Aldrich, Jack Blades	3:56
2.	"Freedom"	Del Vecchio, Castronovo, Aldrich	5:17
3.	"Ride on"	Del Vecchio, Castronovo, Aldrich	3:50
4.	"I Wouldn't Change a Thing" (Originally recorded by Richard Page)	Richard Page	6:13
5.	"Don't Surrender"	Del Vecchio, Castronovo, Aldrich, Simone Mularoni	4:08
6.	"Take You Down"	Del Vecchio, Castronovo, Aldrich	4:39
7.	"The Storm Inside"	Del Vecchio, Castronovo, Aldrich	4:40
8.	"Can't Run Away From Love"	Del Vecchio, Castronovo	4:35
9.	"Running on the Edge"	Del Vecchio, Castronovo	4:25
10.	"Another Chance"	Del Vecchio, Castronovo, Aldrich	4:09
11.	"Falling Apart"	Del Vecchio, Castronovo	5:12
Total length:			51:04

Deluxe Edition Bonus Tracks – Live tracks recorded in Milan at Frontiers Rock Festival on April 29, 2017
No.	Title	Writer(s)	Length
12.	"Back on My Trail"	Del Vecchio	5:40
13.	"Turn Back Time"	Del Vecchio, Blades	4:55
14.	"Here Forever"	Del Vecchio, Francesco Renga	5:21
15.	"Locked Out of Paradise"	Del Vecchio	4:04

Bonus DVD
No.	Title	Length
1.	"Back on My Trails" (Live track recorded in Milan at Frontiers Rock Festival on April 29, 2017)
2.	"Turn Back Time" (Live track recorded in Milan at Frontiers Rock Festival on April 29, 2017)
3.	"Here Forever" (Live track recorded in Milan at Frontiers Rock Festival on April 29, 2017)
4.	"Locked Out of Paradise" (Live track recorded in Milan at Frontiers Rock Festival on April 29, 2017)
5.	"Light in the Dark" (videoclip)
6.	"I Wouldn't Change a Thing" (videoclip)
7.	"Making of Light in the Dark"

== Personnel ==
- Deen Castronovo – drums, lead & backing vocals
- Jack Blades – bass guitar, backing vocals
- Doug Aldrich – guitars

=== Additional personnel ===
- Alessandro Del Vecchio – keyboards, backing vocals, production, mixing, mastering, live keyboards and backing vocals
- Serafino Perugino – executive producer
- Steve Toomey – Live Drums
