= The Third Cage =

Studio album by Tony Martin/Dario Mollo
- Released: 24 January 2012 (US/Canada); 20 January 2012 (Europe)
- Recorded: 2011
- Genre: Hard rock
- Length: 49:56
- Label: Frontiers
- Producer: Dario Mollo

Tony Martin/Dario Mollo chronology
The Cage 2 (2002)	The Third Cage (2012)

The Third Cage is the third collaboration between guitarist Dario Mollo and former Black Sabbath vocalist Tony Martin. All music was written by Mollo, with Martin contributing the lyrics. Mollo also produced, mixed and mastered the album.

== Reception ==
Professional ratings
Review scores
Source	Rating
Metal Temple	8/10 stars
Metal Review	7/10 stars
Metal Underground	3/5 stars
Melodic.net	4/5 stars

The Third Cage was met with mostly positive reviews upon its release. Most reviewers praised Mollo's guitar work in particular and the heavier songs, but criticized some tracks as being "by-the-numbers '80s pop metal". The album's opening and closing tracks, "Wicked World" and "Violet Moon", are often cited as stand-out tracks, the former as an example of a hard rock song "written and performed almost to perfection" and the latter for its "emotive essence".

== Track listing ==
All tracks are written by Dario Mollo/Tony Martin

No.	Title	Length
1.	"Wicked World"	4:30
2.	"Cirque Du Freak"	4:13
3.	"Oh My Soul"	5:01
4.	"One of the Few"	4:01
5.	"Still in Love with You"	4:21
6.	"Can't Stay Here"	4:08
7.	"Wardance"	6:00
8.	"Don't Know What It Is About You"	4:55
9.	"Blind Fury"	5:06
10.	"Violet Moon"	7:36

== Personnel ==
Band members

- Tony Martin – vocals
- Dario Mollo – lead guitar, bass, keyboards
- Fulvio Gaslini – bass
- Roberto Gualdi – drums
- Dario Patti – keyboards
- Brian War – keyboards

Production

- Dario Mollo – production, engineering, and mixing
- Mizuko – photography
- Felipe Machado Franco – cover art
- Tony Martin – liner notes
