= Four (Fair Warning album) =

Studio album by Fair Warning
- Released: 2000
- Genre: Hard rock
- Length: 58:12
- Labels: Frontiers Records; FR CD 050
- Producer: Fair Warning

Fair Warning chronology
Go! (1997)	Four (2000)	Brother's Keeper (2006)

Four is the fourth studio album released by the hard rock band Fair Warning.

== Track listing ==
All songs written by Ule W. Ritgen except where noted.

1. "Heart On the Run" – 5:44 (Helge Engelke)
2. "Through the Fire" – 3:57
3. "Break Free" – 5:03
4. "Forever" – 5:22 (Engelke)
5. "Tell Me I'm Wrong" – 4:18
6. "Dream" – 4:58
7. "I Fight" – 3:58
8. "Time Will Tell" – 4:16
9. "Eyes of Love" – 3:55
10. "Find My Way" – 3:44 (Engelke)
11. "Night Falls" – 4:39
12. "Wait" – 4:04
13. "For the Young" – 4:14 (Engelke)

Japanese Edition

13. "Still I Believe" – 4:50 (Engelke) Japanese bonus track

14. "For the Young" – 4:14 (Engelke)

== Personnel ==
- Tommy Heart – vocals
- Helge Engelke – guitars
- Andy Malecek – guitars
- Ule W. Ritgen – bass guitar
- Philippe Candas – drums (Tracks 1–6 & 8–13)
- C. C. Behrens – drums (Track 7)
