= Alessandro Del Vecchio =

Italian musician and producer

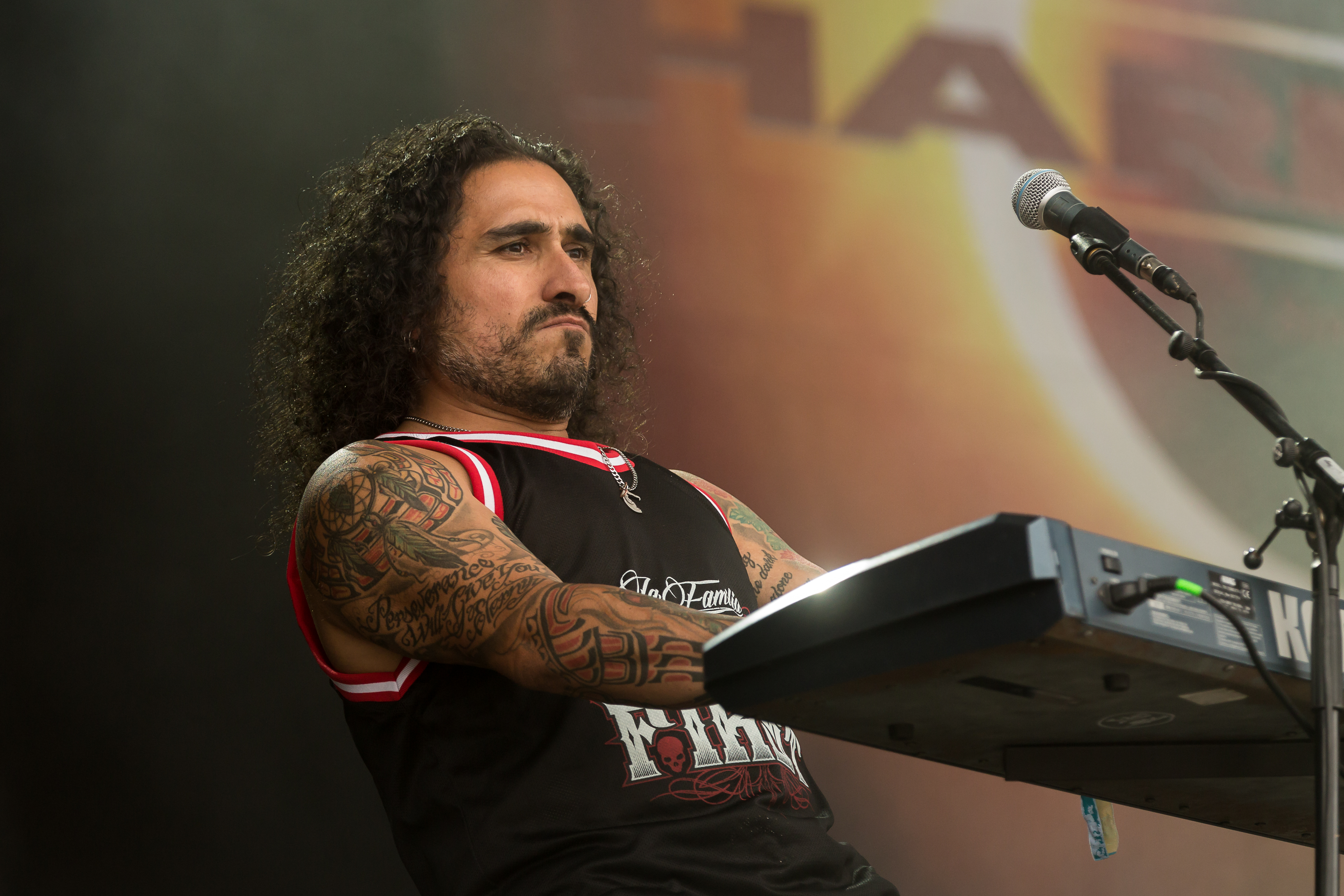
- Del Vecchio performing in 2019

Background information
- Born: 21 April 1979 (age 47); Somma Lombardo, Lombardia, Italy
- Genres: Hard rock, progressive metal, heavy metal, power metal
- Occupations: Musician, producer, songwriter
- Instrument: Keyboards
- Years active: 2003–present
- Website: alessandrodelvecchio.com

Alessandro Del Vecchio (born 21 April 1979) is an Italian musician, record producer and songwriter. He is a current member of hard and heavy bands Edge of Forever, Hardline, Jørn Lande and Vanden Plas.

He is also well known for his collaborations with hard rock and heavy metal artists such as Revolution Saints, Fergie Frederiksen, Ted Poley, Kelly Keeling, Mat Sinner and Alex Beyrodt, and for his work as the in-house producer for Neapolitan record label Frontiers Music SRL from his personal Ivorytears Music Works Studio located just north of Milan.

== Biography ==
=== Formation ===
Born and raised in Italy, his career started at a very young age while honing his skills as a singer, songwriter and versatile instrumentalist. Among his many musical accomplishments, Alessandro found himself at the pinnacle of the industry's most difficult processes. Alessandro began indulging in producing, engineering and mastering hundreds of world-class Billboard chart-topping albums, including a multitude of collaborations from the most sought-after rock groups in the world.

=== Edge of Forever, Moonstone Project and Lionville (2003–2011) ===
Some of Alessandro's most memorable accomplishments were with famed artists Jeff Scott Soto and Marcel Jacob of Talisman and Malmsteen in 2003. In fact, in 2004, they worked collectively on compositions like Edge of Forever's Feeding The Fire, which also featured Bob Harris from Frank Zappa and Axe and in 2005 on second album Let The Demon Rock And Roll.

In 2006 Alessandro was called to sing, play Hammond organ and keyboards in the Moonstone Project first album Time to Take a Stand featuring Kelly Keeling, Graham Bonnet, Glenn Hughes, James Christian, Carmine Appice, Paul Shortino, Steve Walsh, Ian Paice, Tony Franklin and Roberto Tiranti.

In 2009, Alessandro resumed the Edge of Forever project without Bob Harris and Marcel Jacob, but with himself on vocals, keyboards and producing and with a new line-up, released the third album Another Paradise. In the same year he was in the Moonstone Project second album Rebel on the Run with artists as Clive Bunker, James Christian, Robin Beck, Roberto Tiranti, Glenn Hughes, Ken Hensley and Ian Paice.

In 2011 he formed Lionville project with Stefano Lionetti and produced and released the eponymous album with collaboration of Swedish singer Lars Säfsund.

=== Frontiers Records (2011–2024) ===
==== Hardline, Lioville, Alex Beyrodt/Mat Sinner and Revolution Saints ====
In 2011 Frontiers Records called Alessandro for third Johnny Gioeli's Hardline reformation and in 2012 he produced, arranged and played their new album Danger Zone with hit "Fever Dreams". In the same year, he produced, arranged and played the Lionville second album II.

In 2013 Alessandro was on keyboards in German guitar player Alex Beyrodt's project Silent Force for Rising from Ashes album in which he started a long-term collaboration with German guitar player and producer Alex Beyrodt. In the same year Alessandro collaborated with Toto former singer Fergie Frederiksen for his solo album Any Given Moment.

In 2014 he produced, wrote, recorded, played keyboards, mixed and mastered the eponymous album of supergroup Rated X formed by Joe Lynn Turner, Karl Cochran, Tony Franklin and Carmine Appice.

In January 2015 Frontiers combined the skills of Alessandro with German bass player and producer Mat Sinner for the Level 10 record with Symphony X singer Russell Allen the album Chapter One with Randy Black on drums, Alex Beyrodt and Roland Grapow (ex-Helloween, Masterplan) on guitars. Alessandro continued his collaboration with Sinner and Beyrodt with David Readman (Pink Cream 69) on vocals and Francesco Jovino on drums on Voodoo Circle album Whisky Fingers released in November. 2015 was an important year for Alessandro because of Revolution Saints' eponymous album with Deen Castronovo, Doug Aldrich and Jack Blades. This album received important international feedbacks and was acclaimed for Alessandro production and songwriting, particularly for the hit "Back of My Trail". In the same yeah Alessandro worked for supergroup Resurrection Kings (formed by Chas West, Craig Goldy, Sean McNabb and Vinny Appice) for eponymous album and for Kelly Keeling with the album Mind Radio.

==== Sunstorm, Jorn, Edge of Forever return and Jeff Scott Soto ====
In 2016, Frontiers entrusted Alessandro Joe Lynn Turner's project Sunstorm for new production, keyboards and songwriting after Dennis Ward's three-album era. He called on guitar Simone Mularoni of DGM, on bass guitar Nik Mazzucconi of Labyrinth and Edge of Forever and on drums Francesco Jovino of Hardline, Primal Fear, Voodoo Circle and Edge of Forever. On May they released Edge of Tomorrow. In the same year Alessandro started collaboration with Norwegian metal singer Jorn and he produced and played keyboards on cover album Heavy Rock Radio. In October he released with Hardline's Human Nature album.

In 2017, Mat Sinner asked Alessandro to become one of the singers of the massive production of "The Original Rock Meets Classic", featuring the likes of Don Felder, Steve Lukather, Rick Springfield, Francis Rossi among many others. On June he wrote, produced, recorded, played keyboards on, mixed and mastered the new Jorn album Life on Death Road with musicians of the Voodoo Circle's Whisky Fingers Mat Sinner on bass guitar, Alex Beyrodt on guitars and Francesco Jovino on drums. On September Alessandro was involved as producer, session musician, songwriter and sound engineer for Kee of Hearts' eponymous album, a project with German singer Tommy Heart (Fair Warning), Swedish virtuoso guitar player Kee Marcello (ex-Europe), Swedish bass guitar player Ken Sandin (Alien) and Italian drummer Marco Di Salvia (Pino Scotto). On October Revolution Saints released their second album Light in the Dark under complete artistic supervision of Alessandro. In the same year he mixed and mastered the Lionville third album A World of Fools not as band member.

In 2018 Alessandro was active with House of Lords singer James Christian for his solo album Craving as producer and sound engineer. On June Sunstorm returned with the new The Road to Hell with Edo Sala on drums (Folkstone) and on July he produced, wrote, played keyboards on, recorded, mixed and mastered Set The World On Fire for Johnny Gioeli and Deen Castronovo project, both on vocals. On September Alessandro was involved in the new project called Dream Child with Argentinian singer Diego Valdez, Craig Goldy and Wayne Findlay on guitars, Rudy Sarzo on bass guitar and Simon Wright on drums for the album Until Death Do We Meet Again and in the project Groundbreaker with Steve Overland of FM and Robert Säll of Work of Art and W.E.T. for the eponymous album. On December produced, played keyboards, recorded and engineered on Johnny Gioeli first solo album called One Voice.

In 2019 guitar player and producer Roy Z called Alessandro to play keyboards as session on supergroup Spirits of Fire's eponymous album with musicians as Tim Owens on vocals, Chris Caffery on guitars, Steve Di Giorgio on bass guitar and Mark Zonder on drums. On March Jeff Pilson and George Lynch (with Robert Mason and Mick Brown) called Alessandro to mix and master The End Machine's eponymous album. In the same month Alessandro produced, mixed and mastered Burning Rain fourth album Face the Music with Doug Aldrich on guitars, Keith St. Jones on vocals, Brad Lang on bass guitar and Blas Elias on drums. On April Hardline released their new album called Life with new Italian musicians Mario Percudani on guitar and Marco Di Salvia on drums and in May Alessandro recorded for Lords of Black Spanish guitar player the Restless Spirits' eponymous album with the collaboration of Johnny Gioeli, Diego Valdez, Dino Jelusić and Deen Castronovo. On June Jorn released live album Live on Death Road with Alessandro on production, keyboards and engineering. In December, Alessandro returned with Edge of Forever and their album Native Soul. The new line-up is formed by Nik Mazzucconi on bass guitar (formerly in Another Paradise), Aldo Lonobile (Secret Sphere) on guitar and Marco Di Salvia on drums, respectively, instead of Walter Galiaro and Francesco Jovino. In the same mouth Alessandro (writing, producing, recording, playing bass guitar and keyboards on, mixing and mastering) released Lovekillers' eponymous album featuring TNT singer Tony Harnell.

In 2020, Alessandro returned with Revolution Saints, which recorded Rise in collaboration with Dan Rossall on songwriting. In the same day Jorn released Heavy Rock Radio II: Executing The Classics with Alessandro on producing, recording, keyboards, engineering and Dirty Shirley (Dino Jelusick on vocals, George Lynch on guitars, Trevor Roxx on bass and Will Hunt on drums) released their eponymous album with Alessandro on producing, recording, mixing and mastering. In February, Alessandro was involved with mixing and mastering of supergroup Black Swan's (Robin McAuley on vocals, Reb Beach on guitar, Jeff Pilson on bass and Matt Starr on drums) Shake the World and with new Hardline live Life: Live. In the middle of the year, Alessandro was involved in songwriting, keyboards, bass and producing in a hard rock project of Canadian singer Rosa Laricchiuta called Black Rose Maze with Italian musicians Andrea Seveso and Michele Sanna. At the end of 2020, Alessandro began the new collaboration with the singer Jeff Scott Soto and produced, wrote, arranged, played keyboards and bass on the solo album Wide Awake (in My Dreamland).

==== Robin McAuley, Michael Sweet, Tracii Guns and Giant ====
In 2021, Alessandro wrote, produced, and played new album of Issa called Queen of Broken Hearts. Sunstorm returned with new singer Ronnie Romero instead of Joe Lynn Turner and new drummer Michele Sanna instead of Edo Sala, and it recorded a new album Afterlife. In the middle of the year, Alessandro started his collaboration with Robin McAuley and wrote, produced, played keyboards and bass in the album Standing on the Edge. At the same time, he released with Michael Sweet of Stryper and Tracii Guns of L.A. Guns the project Sunbomb with the album Evil and Divine. In July, Hardline released the new album Heart, Mind and Soul. In 2021, Resurrection Kings returned without Sean McNabb on bass, replaced by Alessandro, who also played keyboards. The new album was called Skygazer. In September, Alessandro produced, played keyboards on, mixed and mastered the eponymous album of the new project with Metal Church former singer Ronny Munroe called Between Worlds. At the end of 2021, Alessandro produced, played keyboards on, mixed and mastered the first cover duets album of Jeff Scott Soto called The Duet Collection, Vol. 1 and wrote, produced, played keyboards on, mixed and mastered Groundbreaker's second album called Soul to Soul.

In January 2022, Alessandro took part in Giant reunion with new singer Kent Hilli from the Perfect Plan band. The album was called Shifting Time which Alessandro produced, played keyboards on, mixed and mastered. At the same time, Edge of Forever released the new album Seminole. In April, Alessandro started a new collaboration with Ronnie Romero for a cover album called Raised on Radio. At the same time, Alessandro produced, mixed, mastered and played keyboards and bass on the new album Little Bang Theory for the new project Poison Rose with Marco Sivo on vocals, Aldo Lonobile and Andrea Seveso on guitars, and Edo Sala on drums. In this period, Alessandro mixed and mastered the Black Swan's second album Generation Mind. In May, he wrote, played keyboards and bass on, produced, mixed and mastered Jeff Scott Soto's album Complicated. In the same month Alessandro collaborated in the new supergroup project called Skills with Renan Zonta of Electric Mob on vocals, Brad Gillis on guitars, Billy Sheehan on bass and David Huff of Giant on drums with the album Different Worlds on which he played keyboards and produced, mixed and mastered. In Jun,e Alessandro took part in the new project Iconic with Nathan James of Inglorious on vocals, Michael Sweet and Joel Hoekstra on guitars, Marco Mendoza on bass and Tommy Aldridge on drums. The band released the album Second Skin on which Alessandro played keyboards and co-produced with Sweet, mixed and mastered. In the same month, Alessandro released the new Jorn album Over the Horizon Radar on keyboards and mixing. In August, the Sunstorm returned with a new album Brothers in Arms with Luca Princiotta on guitar instead of Simone Muraloni. In November Alessandro took part in the new project Enemy Eyes with Johnny Gioeli (Hardline) on vocals, Marcos Rodriguez (ex-Rage) on guitars and Fabio Alessandrini (Annihilator) on drums with their album History's Hand.

== Discography ==
=== As actual band member ===
Band	Album details	Role
Edge of Forever	Feeding the Fire: Label: MTM Music; Release date: 24 May 2004	Composer, Co-producer, Keyboards, Backing Vocals
Edge of Forever	Let the Demon Rock 'n' Roll: Label: MTM Music; Release date: 17 May 2005	Composer, Keyboards
Edge of Forever	Another Paradise: Label: 7Hard; Release date: 9 December 2009	Composer, Arrangements, Producer, Recording, Mixing, Keyboards, Vocals
Edge of Forever	Native Soul: Label: Frontiers Music Records; Release date: 6 December 2019	Composer, Arrangements, Producer, Recording, Mixing, Mastering, Keyboards, Vocals
Edge of Forever	Seminole: Label: Frontiers Music Records; Release date: 21 January 2022	Composer, Arrangements, Producer, Recording, Mixing, Mastering, Keyboards, Vocals
Edge of Forever	Ritual: Label: Frontiers Music Records; Release date: 12 October 2023	Composer, Arrangements, Producer, Recording, Mixing, Mastering, Keyboards, Vocals
Hardline	Danger Zone: Label: Frontiers Music Records; Release date: 18 May 2012	Composer, arrangements, Producer, Recording, Mixing, Mastering, Keyboards, Backing vocals
Hardline	Human Nature: Label: Frontiers Music Records; Release date: 14 October 2016	Composer, Arrangements, Producer, Recording, Mixing, Mastering, Keyboards, Backing vocals
Hardline	Life: Label: Frontiers Music Records; Release date: 26 April 2019	Composer, Arrangements, Producer, Recording, Mixing, Mastering, Keyboards, Backing vocals
Hardline	Heart, Mind and Soul: Label: Frontiers Music Records; Release date: 9 July 2021	Composer, Arrangements, Producer, Recording, Mixing, Mastering, Keyboards, Backing vocals
Jorn	Heavy Rock Radio: Label: Frontiers Music Records; Release date: 3 June 2016	Recording, Keyboards, Backing vocals
Jorn	Life on Death Road: Label: Frontiers Music Records; Release date: 2 June 2017	Composer, Arrangements, Producer, Recording, Mixing, Mastering, Keyboards, Backing vocals
Jorn	Heavy Rock Radio II - Executing the Classics: Label: Frontiers Music Records; Release date: 24 January 2020	Arrangements, Producer, Recording, Mixing, Mastering, Keyboards
Jorn	Over the Horizon Radar: Label: Frontiers Music Records; Release date: 17 June 2022	Additional Recording, Mixing, Mastering, Keyboards
Vanden Plas	The Empyrean Equation Of The Long Lost Things: Label: Frontiers Music Records; Release date: 19 April 2024	Recording, Keyboards

=== As former band member ===
Band	Album details	Role
Moonstone Project	Rebel on the Run: Label: Blistering Records; Release date: 27 May 2009	Composer, Co-producer, Recording, Editing, Co-mixing, Keyboards, Drums, Backing Vocals
Shining Line	Shining Line: Label: Avenue Of Allies Music; Release date: 14 May 2010	Composer, Producer, Recording, Editing, Mixing, Mastering, Keyboards, Vocals
Eden's Curse	Trinity: Label: AFM Records; Release date: 18 March 2011	Keyboards, Additional editing
Lionville	Lionville: Label: Avenue Of Allies Music; Release date: 10 June 2011	Composer, Arranger, Producer, Recording, Mixing, Mastering, Keyboards, Backing vocals
Lionville	II: Label: Avenue Of Allies Music; Release date: 29 May 2012	Producer, Mixing, Mastering, Keyboards, Backing Vocals
Silent Force	Rising from Ashes: Label: AFM Records; Release date: 12 December 2013	Keyboards
Alex Beyrodt's Voodoo Circle	Whisky Fingers: Label: AFM Records; Release date: 27 November 2015	Composer, Co-arrangements, Recording, Mixing, Mastering, Keyboards, Vocals

=== Other projects ===
Year	Band	Title	Notes
2006	Moonstone Project	Time To Take A Stand	producer, songwriting, keyboards, vocals, mixing, mastering (Majestic Records)
2006	Lizhard	Lizhard	co-producer, keyboards, mixing, mastering (Perris Records)
2012	Issa	Can't Stop	producing, keyboards, recording, mixing, mastering (Frontiers Records)
2013	Fergie Frederiksen	Any Given Moment	producing, songwriting, keyboards, vocals, mixing, mastering (Frontiers Records)
2013	Place Vendome	Thunder in the Distance	songwriting on track 1, 2, 7, 8, 9 and 13 (Frontiers Records)
2013	Find Me	Wings of Love	songwriting on tracks 1, 2, 4, 9 (Frontiers Records)
2014	Rated X	Rated X	producing, songwriting, keyboards, vocals, recording, mixing, mastering (Frontiers Records)
2014	Ez Livin'	Firestorm	mixing, mastering (LZ Records)
2014	L.R.S.	Down to the Core	producing, recording, mixing, mastering, songwriting, keyboards, backing vocals (Frontiers Records)
2014	Three Lions	Three Lions	producing, recording, mixing, mastering, songwriting, keyboards (Frontiers Records)
2014	Bailey	Long Way Down	producing, recording, mixing, mastering, keyboards, additional backing vocals (Frontiers Records)
2015	Resurrection Kings	Resurrection Kings	producer, songwriting, keyboards, vocals, mixing, mastering (Frontiers Records)
2015	Revolution Saints	Revolution Saints	producer, songwriting, keyboards, vocals, mixing, mastering (Frontiers Records)
2015	Level 10	Chapter One	songwriting, keyboards (Frontiers Records)
2015	Docker's Guild	The Heisenberg Diaries – Book A: Sounds of Future Past	mixing (Lion Music, Rock Company, Black Swan Records)
2015	Maya	The Prophecy is Broken	recording, mixing, mastering (Underground Symphony)
2015	Kelly Keeling	Mind Radio	producing, recording, mixing, mastering, songwriting, keyboards, backing vocals (Frontiers Records)
2016	Sunstorm	Edge of Tomorrow	producer, songwriting, keyboards, vocals (Frontiers Records)
2016	Faithsedge	Restoration	keyboards (Scarlet Records)
2016	Rebelhot	Rebelhot	mastering (Metallapolis Records)
2016	Ted Poley	Beyond the Fade	producer, recording, mixing, mastering, additional guitar, drums, keyboards, backing vocals (Frontiers Records)
2016	Roth Brock Project	Roth Both Project	mixing, mastering (Frontiers Records)
2017	Revolution Saints	Light in the Dark	producer, songwriting, keyboards, vocals, mixing, mastering (Frontiers Records)
2017	Place Vendome	Close to the Sun	additional Choirs on "Strong", songwriting "Strong" and "Yesterday is Gone" (Frontiers Records)
2017	Kee of Hearts	Kee of Hearts	producer, keyboards, vocals, recording, mixing (Frontiers Records)
2017	Lionsoul	Welcome Storm	producing, recording, mixing, mastering, backing vocals (Limb Music)
2017	Eisley/Goldy	Blood, Buts and Games	mixing, mastering, additional keyboards on tracks 3, 5 and 7 (Frontiers Records)
2017	Graham Bonnet Band	Live... Here Come the Night (Frontiers Rock Festival 2016)	recording, mixing, mastering (Frontiers Records)
2017	Tyketto	Live from Milan 2017	recording (Frontiers Records)
2017	Treat	The Road More ore Less Traveled	recording (Frontiers Records)
2017	All 4 1	The World's Best Hope	producer, keyboards, backing vocals, mixing, mastering (Frontiers Records)
2017	Lionville	A World of Fools	mixing, mastering (Frontiers Records)
2018	Sunstorm	The Road to Hell	producer, songwriting, keyboards, vocals, mixing, mastering (Frontiers Records)
2018	Mr. Big	Live From Milan	producer (Frontiers Records)
2018	Gioeli-Castronovo	Set The World On Fire	producer, songwriting, keyboards, vocals, mixing, mastering (Frontiers Records)
2018	James Christian	Craving	producer, keyboards on "Jesus Swept" (Frontiers Records)
2018	L.A. Guns	Made in Milan	producer, mixing, mastering (Frontiers Records)
2018	Dream Child	Until Death Do Do We Meet Again	producer, songwriting, keyboards, vocals, mixing, mastering (Frontiers Records)
2018	Johnny Gioeli	One Voice	producer, recording, keyboards, mixing, mastering (Frontiers Records)
2018	Nanowar of Steel	Stairway to Valhalla	producer, mixing, mastering, keyboards (Audioglobe)
2018	Labyrinth	Return to Live	recording, mixing, mastering (Frontiers Records)
2018	State of Salazar	Superhero	mixing, mastering (Frontiers)
2018	Issa	Run with the Pack	producer, recording, mixing, mastering, songwriting, keyboards (Frontiers Records)
2018	Groundbreaker	Groundbreaker	producer, recording, mixing, mastering, songwriting, keyboards (Frontiers Records)
2018	Steelheart	Rock 'N Milan	recording, mastering (Frontiers Records)
2018	Alcatrazz	Parole Denied: Tokyo 2017	mixing, mastering (Frontiers Records)
2019	Quiet Riot	One Night in Milan	producer, keyboards, mixing, mastering (Frontiers Records)
2019	Spirits of Fire	Spirits of Fire	keyboards (Frontiers Records)
2019	Restless Spirits	Restless Spirits	recording, vocals on track 8, songwriting and vocals on track 9, backing vocals on tracks 2, 6 and 7 (Frontiers Records)
2019	The End Machine	The End Machine	mixing, mastering (Frontiers Records)
2019	Burning Rain	Face the Music	producer, mixing, mastering (Frontiers Records)
2019	Lovekillers feat. Tony Harnell	Lovekillers	producer, recording, mixing, mastering, songwriting, keyboards, bass guitar, vocals (Frontiers Records)
2019	TNT	Encore: Live in Milano	recording (Frontiers Records)
2019	Be for You (B4U)	The Things I Never Told You	mixing, mastering (Volcano Records)
2019	Find Me	Angels in Blue	songwriting on tracks 9, 10 and 11 (Frontiers Records)
2020	Revolution Saints	Rise	producer, recording, mixing, mastering, songwriting, keyboards, backing vocals (Frontiers Records)
2020	Black Swan	Shake the World	mixing, mastering (Frontiers Records)
2020	Dirty Shirley	Dirty Shirley	producer, mixing, mastering (Frontiers Records)
2020	Michael Thompson Band	High Times: Live in Italy	producer, mixing, mastering (Frontiers Records)
2020	Archon Angel	Fallen	songwriting on tracks 4 and 9 (Frontiers Records)
2020	Alessandro Del Vecchio	Sound from the Notebook	songwriting, producing, recording, mixing. mastering, all instruments, vocals (Frontiers Records)
2022	Star One	Revel in Time	lead vocals and keyboard solo on "The Year of '41 (alternate version)" (InsideOut Music)
2022	Zadra	Guiding Star	producer, bass, keyboards, backing vocals, additional rhythm guitars on "Won't Let Your Love Take Me Down"
2022	Docker's Guild	The Mystic Technocracy - Season 2: The Age of Entropy	mixing, mastering on "S.O.S. Spazio 1999" (Elevate Records)
2023	Cassidy Paris	New Sensation	production, bass, guitar, keyboards, backing vocals (Frontiers Records)
