= Dr. Mastermind =

American heavy metal band

- Origin: Portland, Oregon, U.S.
- Genres: Heavy metal, speed metal
- Years active: 1982–present
- Members: Matt McCourt
- Past members: Dave Koenig Chon Carter Kip Doran Rik Baggett Chris Jacobsen Ken Goldstein Ben Linton Deen Castronovo Kurt James Ronn Chick Bryce van Patten Tom Parenteau Kevin Sanders

Dr. Mastermind is an American heavy metal band formed in 1982 and initially featuring future Journey drummer Deen Castronovo, Wild Dogs vocalist Matt McCourt, and guitarist Kurt James.

== History ==
Singer and bassist Matt McCourt formed the band in 1982 under the name Evil Genius. In the same year, he recorded a demo in the Ace Tunnel Sound studio in Portland, Oregon, United States, with musicians Dave Koening, Chon Carter and Kip Doran featuring three tracks.

After several line-up changes, another demo with the title Evil Genius was recorded, which was later released as Dr. Mastermind Must Die! under the original band name Evil Genius. With this line-up the band played several local shows, before they split up again after not receiving contract offers by music labels.

After sending the Evil Genius demo to Mike Varney of Shrapnel Records, McCourt was offered a contract with the label, under the condition that he found a drummer for the band, which he found in Deen Castronovo, who he had already played with before in Wild Dogs. On guitar, they found Kurt James.

Shortly before the album Dr. Mastermind was released in 1986, the band was renamed to Mastermind after being urged to do so by their label. Shortly after, the name was changed again, this time to Dr. Mastermind, after another band called Mastermind threatened legal action. The first tracks for the album were recorded at Cascade studio in Portland, Oregon. The mixing and mastering took place at Prairie Sun studios in Cotati, California. After the release of Dr. Mastermind, Castronovo, James and session guitarist Ronn Chick left the band.

From this point on, the band primarily consisted only of McCourt, who in the following years released a DVD and a few compilations on his own label US Metal Records. During the early 2000s, he re-released the Dr. Mastermind album with additional live recordings and the song "Evil Seed". At around the same time he also released the DVD Captured Alive! - One Night Stand and the compilation History of Evil Genius, which included unreleased demo recordings.

In 2005, the album Sin Sandwich was released with a new, but also short-lived, line-up.

In 2017, another compilation with the title Before and After was released.

== Members ==
=== Current ===
- Matt McCourt – bass, vocals (1982–present)

=== Former ===
- Dave Koenig – bass (1982)
- Chon Carter – drums (1982)
- Kip Doran – guitars (1982–1984)
- Rik Baggett – drums (1983)
- Chris Jacobsen – guitars (1984)
- Ken Goldstein – bass (1984)
- Ben Linton – drums (1984)
- Deen Castronovo – drums (1986)
- Kurt James – guitars (1986)
- Ronn Chick – guitars (1986)
- Bryce van Patten – drums (2005)
- Tom Parenteau – guitars (2005)
- Kevin Sanders – guitars (2005)

== Discography ==
- Evil Genius (demo) (1984)
- Dr. Mastermind (1986)
- Captured Alive! - One Night Stand (DVD) (2000)
- History of Evil Genius (compilation) (2003)
- Sin Sandwich (2005)
- Dr. Mastermind Must Die! (compilation released as Evil Genius) (2006)
- Before and After (compilation) (2017)
