= Rising from Ashes =

Rising from Ashes may refer to:

- Rising from Ashes (film), 2012 documentary film about Rwanda's national cycling team
- Rising from Ashes (album), 2013 Silent Force album
