= Kee of Hearts (album) =

Studio album by Kee of Hearts
- Released: 15 September 2017 (International edition); 30 August 2017 (Japanese edition)
- Studios: GEM Studio, Gothenburg, Sweden; Ivorytears Music Works Studios, Somma Lombardo, Italy
- Genre: Hard rock
- Length: 45:06 (International edition); 48:57 (Japanese edition)
- Labels: Frontiers Records (International edition); Marquee (Japanese edition)
- Producer: Alessandro Del Vecchio

Singles from Kee of Hearts
- 1. "A New Dimension" Released: 27 June 2017; 2. "The Storm" Released: 13 July 2017; 3. "Bridge to Heaven" Released: 17 August 2017; 4. "Crimson Dawn" Released: 6 September 2017

Professional ratings
Review scores
Source	Rating
Classic Rock	3.5/5 stars
MetalHammer	8/10 stars

Kee of Hearts is the only album by an eponymous supergroup Kee of Hearts formed by Tommy Heart, singer of Fair Warning, and Kee Marcello, former Europe guitarist. The line-up is completed by Ken Sandlin (Alien) on bass and Marco Di Salvia (Pino Scotto) on drums. It was released via Neapolitan label Frontiers Records on 15 September 2017, anticipated by singles "A New Dimension" on 27 June, "The Storm" on 13 July, "Bridge to Heaven" on August 17 and "Crimson Dawn" on 6 September. It was produced by Italian multi-instrumentalist Alessandro Del Vecchio, also involved as songwriter, keyboardist and backing vocalist.

The Japanese edition was released in Japan on 30 August via Marquee anche it contains an acoustic version of the song "Invincible" as a bonus track.

== Track listing ==
Kee of Hearts track listing
No.	Title	Writer(s)	Length
1.	"The Storm"	Alessandro Del Vecchio	4:21
2.	"A New Dimension"	Del Vecchio, Richard Hamas	4:29
3.	"Crimson Dawn"	Del Vecchio, Carmine Martone	4:41
4.	"Bridge to Heaven"	Del Vecchio, Paul Bonin	4:57
5.	"Stranded"	Del Vecchio	3:56
6.	"Mama Don't Cry"	Del Vecchio, Marcus Nygren	3:27
7.	"Invisible"	Del Vecchio	3:51
8.	"S.O.S."	Del Vecchio	3:57
9.	"Edge of Paradise"	Del Vecchio	4:21
10.	"Twist of Fate"	Del Vecchio	3:35
11.	"Learn to Love Again"	Del Vecchio, Bonin	3:41
Total length:			45:06

Japanese edition bonus track
No.	Title	Writer(s)	Length
12.	"Invincible" (acoustic version)	Del Vecchio	3:51

== Personnel ==
- Tommy Heart - vocals
- Kee Marcello - guitars
- Ken Sandin - bass guitars
- Marco Di Salvia - drums

=== Additional personnel ===
- Serafino Perugino - executive producer
- Alessandro Del Vecchio - producing, mixing, mastering, keyboards, backing vocals
- Maor Appelbaum - remastering
- Andrea Seveso - studio assistant
- Mattia Stancioiu - studio assistant
- Anders Fästader - artwork
- Johnny Pixel - pictures
