= Giuntini Project IV =

Studio album by Giuntini Project
- Released: 24 May 2013
- Genre: Hard rock, heavy metal
- Label: Escape Music
- Producer: Dario Mollo

Giuntini Project chronology
Giuntini Project III (2006)	Giuntini Project IV (2013)

Professional ratings
Review scores
Source	Rating
Sea of Tranquility	4.5/5 stars
Hard Rock Heaven	6/10 stars
Metal Temple	8/10 stars

Giuntini Project IV is the fourth album by Italian guitarist Aldo Giuntini's solo band and the third to feature former Black Sabbath singer Tony Martin on vocals. Swedish rock singer Liz Vandall performs guest vocals on the track "Bring on the Night".

Like the previous album, is produced by Dario Mollo; Tony Martin said "the Giuntini music is only possible with Dario Mollo producing".

The album was released on 24 May 2013.

== Track listing ==
No.	Title	Length
1.	"Perfect Sorrow"	3:08
2.	"Born in the Underworld"	5:17
3.	"Shadow of the Stone"	3:58
4.	"Cured"	4:08
5.	"I Don't Believe in Fortune"	4:03
6.	"If the Dream Comes True"	4:45
7.	"The Rise and Fall of Barry Lyndon" (instrumental)	4:33
8.	"Bring on the Night"	4:20
9.	"Not the Jealous Kind"	4:32
10.	"Saint or Sinner"	3:57
11.	"Last Station: Nightmare" (instrumental)	5:19
12.	"How the Story Ends" (Megadeth cover)	4:24
13.	"Truth Never Lie"	5:12

Japanese edition
No.	Title	Length
11.	"Your Love Is Killing Me"	4:14
12.	"Last Station: Nightmare" (instrumental)	5:19
13.	"How the Story Ends" (Megadeth cover)	4:24
14.	"Truth Never Lie"	5:12

== Personnel ==
Band members

- Aldo Giuntini – guitar
- Tony Martin – vocals
- Fulvio Gaslini – bass
- Fabbiano Rizzi – drums
- Roberto Gualdi – drums
- Liz Vandall – vocals on 'Bring on the Night'
