= Giuntini Project =

Italian rock band

- Origin: Italy
- Genres: Hard rock, heavy metal
- Years active: 1988–present
- Labels: Frontiers
- Members: Aldo Giuntini, Tony Martin, Fulvio Gaslini, Ezio Secomandi, Dario Patti
- Past members: Charles Bowyer
- Website: aldogiuntini.com

Giuntini Project is an Italian rock band formed in 1988 by guitarist Aldo Giuntini as a solo project. To date, the band has released four albums.

== History ==
Beginning his career playing in Leghorn-based progressive rock band Cryin' Earth, Italian guitarist Aldo Giuntini left in 1984 in order to pursue a solo career. After meeting fellow guitarist and sound engineer Dario Mollo in 1988, Giuntini began working in earnest on an album under the name Giuntini Project.

The next two years were spent writing and rehearsing material, during which time he was approached by English producer Kit Woolven, who had been impressed by early demos and produced the album along with Mollo. It was another two years before Charles Bowyer was enlisted into the band as a singer and the band's first, self-titled album was finally released in 1993.

In 1995, work commenced on a follow-up album, with former Black Sabbath singer Tony Martin taking over vocal duties. Giuntini Project II was released in 1999, again produced by Woolven and Mollo. It was during the recording of this album that Martin and Mollo began work on their own project, The Cage

Seven years later, Giuntini and Martin reunited to record Giuntini Project III, once again produced by Mollo and released on 28 April 2006.

A fourth album, Giuntini Project IV, was released in May 2013.

== Discography ==
- Giuntini Project Vol. 1 (1993)
- Giuntini Project II (1999)
- Giuntini Project III (2006)
- Giuntini Project IV (2013)

== Band members ==
Current members

- Aldo Giuntini – guitar
- Tony Martin – vocals
- Fulvio Gaslini – bass
- Ezio Secomandi – drums
- Dario Patti – keyboards

Former members

- Charles Bowyer – vocals
