= Chez Kane =

- Born: Cheryl Kane; 15 December, 1990
- Genres: Glam metal, Arena rock
- Publisher: Frontiers Music
- Formerly of: Kane'd

Chez Kane (Cheryl Kane) is a Welsh rock singer known for her work as a solo artist and as a member of the hard rock band Kane'd. She rose to international prominence through her collaboration with producer and songwriter Danny Rexon, releasing a series of melodic hard rock albums on the Frontiers Music label. Her music draws heavily from the glam metal, AOR, and melodic hard rock styles of the 1980s, earning comparisons to artists such as Robin Beck, Lee Aaron, and Lita Ford.

== Biography ==
=== Early life ===
Kane was born and raised in South Wales, United Kingdom. She developed an interest in music at an early age, and wanted to be a singer like her father. She began performing alongside her sisters, Stephanie and Stacey Kane. The three later formed the rock band Kane'd, with each member contributing lead and backing vocals. The band stopped working for a time when Chez Kane started a solo career, and Stephanie and Stacey left music to focus on motherhood a short time later.

=== Solo career ===
Chez Kane also started a YouTube channel as a cover artist. Swedish musician and producer Danny Rexon, best known as the lead vocalist of Crazy Lixx, wrote several songs for a new artist, as he intended to work as a record producer. Rexon discovered Chez Kane thanks to her YouTube channel. Chez Kane was interested by those songs, as it was her favorite music style. Rexon wanted to produce a female rocker playing a 1980s style, and although the style was not fashionable at the moment, the decided to go on anyway. However, the interactions between Kane and Rexon were limited by the COVID-19 pandemic in Wales. Neither Kane could travel to Sweden or Rexon to the UK, so they exchanged recording tasks by internet, which delayed the recording of the album by nearly six months.

Her self-titled debut album, Chez Kane, was released in March 2021. Produced by Rexon, the album received positive reviews from critics specializing in melodic rock and AOR, with particular praise directed toward Kane's vocal performance and the album's authentic 1980s-inspired sound. It also reached the top ten of the UK Rock & Metal Albums Chart. As a member of Frontiers Music, she made collaborations with Jim Peterik and Tony Hernando.

In October 2022, Kane released her second studio album, Powerzone. While retaining the melodic hard rock sound of its predecessor, the album featured a stronger emphasis on arena rock influences and further established her presence within the international melodic rock community. Kane tried to write songs for it but was not convinced by the results, and stuck to songs written by Rexon.

Her third studio album, Reckless, was released in 2026. In addition to performing, Kane contributed to the songwriting process for several tracks, marking a greater creative involvement in her solo work. The album continued her collaboration with Danny Rexon while expanding her musical approach beyond the retro-inspired sound of her earlier releases. Kane explained that she was facing personal problems at the time, and wanted the tone of the album to be as uplifting as possible. The album was first presented in an acoustic show in Swansea, followed by a tour across the United Kingdom.

== Discography ==
- Chez Kane (2021)
- Powerzone (2022)
- Reckless (2026)
