= Temple Balls =

Finnish rock band

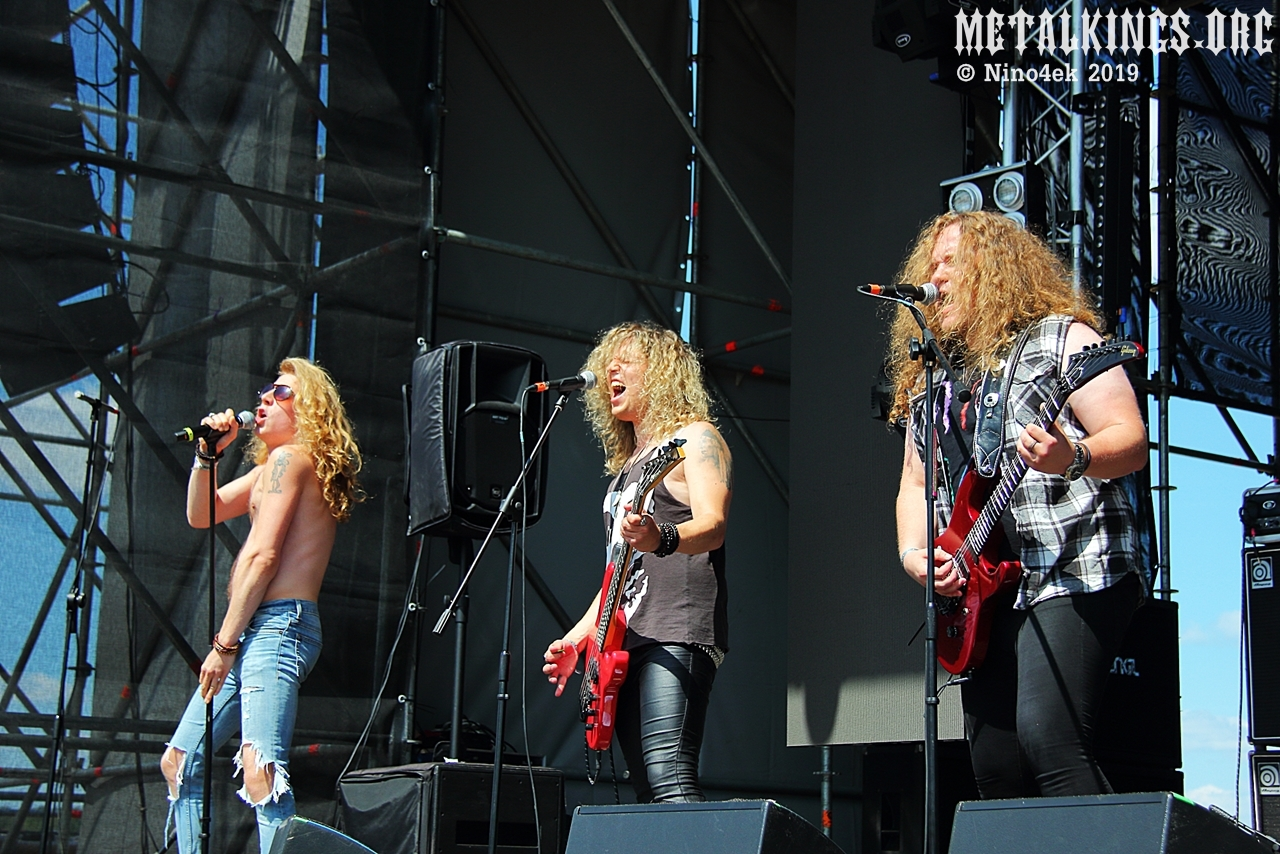
- Temple Balls in 2019

Background information
- Origin: Finland
- Genres: Melodic hard rock
- Years active: 2009–present
- Labels: Ranka Kustannus; Frontiers Music
- Website: templeballsrocks.com

Temple Balls are a Finnish melodic hard rock band formed in 2009. Their debut album was released in 2017 by Ranka Kustannus, a record label established by Spinefarm Records founder Riku Pääkkönen.

The band has gained popularity especially in Japan, where they were voted the "second brightest hope" by the readers of Burrn! magazine in 2017. They have also been chosen as the Newcomer of the Year in 2017 by a Japanese music critic Masanori Ito.

The band's second album, Untamed, was released in 2019. Their next three albums, Pyromide (2021), Avalanche (2023), and the self-titled Temple Balls (2026), were released by Italian record label Frontiers Music Srl.
