= Resurrection Kings =

American heavy metal rock group

- Genres: Hard rock; heavy metal
- Years active: 2015–present
- Label: Frontiers
- Members: Chas West; Craig Goldy; Sean McNabb; Vinny Appice
- Website: www.facebook.com/ResurrectionKingsMusic/

Resurrection Kings is a heavy metal rock group. Its members are former Dio guitar player Craig Goldy and singer Chas West (formerly of Bonham and Tribe of Gypsies).

In 2011, Goldy asked West to get together to write and record. After hearing the song "Livin' Out Loud", recorded at those demo sessions, Frontiers Records president Serafino Perugino asked Goldy to create a band. The band added Sean McNabb of Lynch Mob, Dokken and Quiet Riot, as a bass player, and Goldy's former Dio bandmate Vinny Appice as a drummer.

Alessandro Del Vecchio, Frontiers' in-house writer and producer, wrote (or co-wrote with Goldy) a few tracks, and the band released its eponymous album in 2016.

== Discography ==
- 2016 – Resurrection Kings
- 2021 – Skygazer

== Band members ==
- Chas West – vocals (since 2015)
- Craig Goldy – guitar (since 2015)
- Sean McNabb – bass guitar (since 2015)
- Vinny Appice – drums (since 2015)
