= Helge Engelke =

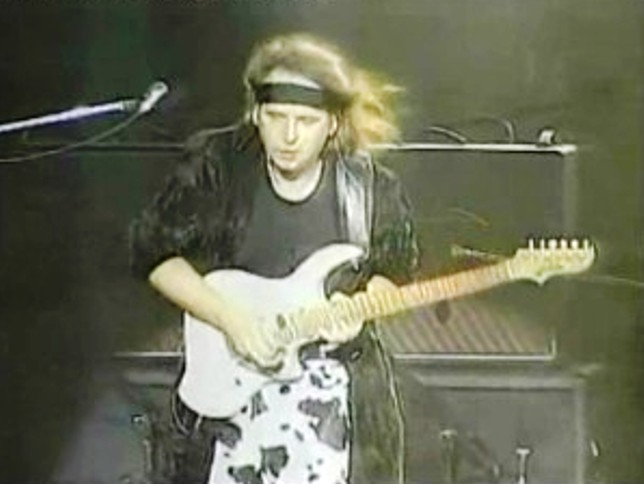

Background information
- Born: Helge Engelke; 24 September 1961; Hanover, Lower Saxony, West Germany
- Died: 28 April 2023 (aged 61)
- Genres: Melodic rock, hard rock, rock
- Occupations: Guitarist, songwriter, producer
- Years active: 1990–2023
- Labels: Dreamtide: United Talents, Fair Warning: Big Beat
- Website: www.helgeengelke.com

Helge Engelke (24 September 1961 – 28 April 2023) was a German guitar player, composer, and producer most celebrated for his guitar work in the hard rock bands Fair Warning and Dreamtide. He had also recorded as a studio musician, performing on various artists' albums, such as vocals and guitar for Zeno Roth.

== Life ==
Engelke was born in Hanover, Germany. He started playing guitar at the age of 13 and soon became obsessed with the instrument and music in general. He wrote, "I listened to everything that was around. From Yes to Genesis, from T Rex to Mott the Hoople, from Deep Purple to Led Zeppelin. My favorite band was—and in some concerns still is—Rainbow. I really liked the mixture of heavy rock guitars with strong vocal melodies and powerful drums." The young musician was a fan of both Uli Jon Roth (then Ulrich Roth) and Michael Schenker; his early guitar preferences were the Fender Stratocaster and the Gibson Flying V.

In 1996, Engelke was in a car accident and broke both arms. It took him approximately five months to recover and regain his playing skills, delaying the recording and mixing of Fair Warning's "Live and More".

On 11 August 2012, he married long-time girlfriend Olatz Ibarlucea in Llodio, Pais Vasco, Spain.

== Fair Warning, Dreamtide ==
The band Fair Warning originated in 1990 from a band called Zeno. With their first demo they were signed to WEA worldwide. In April 2000, Andy Malecek left the group followed by Tommy Heart in August, effectively breaking up the band. Fair Warning reunited in the summer of 2005 and most recently recorded the studio albums Sundancer (2013) and Pimp Your Past (2016).

Engelke formed Dreamtide in 2001 with then former Fair Warning drummer, C.C. Behrens. The band included Olaf Senkbeil (vocals), Ole Hempelmann (bass), and Torsten Luederwaldt (keyboards). Francis Buchholz (Scorpions) replaced Hempelmann for the third album. Dreamtide's most recent album, Drama Dust Dream, was released in 2022.

== Other activity ==
In 2011, Engelke helped produce the German band Nitrogods' eponymous first studio album. In 2014, he co-wrote and co-produced "Unbroken", a new album from Hannover-based band Thomsen.

== Death ==
Helge Engelke died from colon cancer on 28 April 2023, at age 61, two days after a colon tumor was discovered.

== Discography ==
Fair Warning

- 1992 - Fair Warning
- 1993 - Live in Japan (Live)
- 1995 - Rainmaker
- 1995 - Live at Home (Live)
- 1997 - Go!
- 1998 - Live and More (Live)
- 2000 - Four
- 2006 - Brother's Keeper
- 2009 - Aura
- 2010 - Talking Ain't Enough (Live)
- 2010 - Talking Ain't Enough (DVD)
- 2012 - Best and More
- 2012 - Save Me (Single)
- 2013 - Sundancer
- 2016 - Pimp your Past
- 2019 - Two Nights to Remember (2CDs + DVD)

Dreamtide

- 2001 - Here Comes the Flood
- 2003 - Dreams For the Daring
- 2008 - Dream and Deliver
- 2022 - Drama Dust Dream

Other appearances

- 1992 - Letter X "Born into darkness"
- 1992 - Inspiration "Anyway"
- 1992 - Victory "You Bought It You Name It"
- 1992 - Simone "Sometimes"
- 1992 - Simone "Passenger" single
- 1993 - Mind odyssey "Keep it all turning"
- 1993 - V.A.N.
- 1994 - Eloy "Destination"
- 1995 - Zeno "Zenology"
- 1998 - Karel Gott "Für Immer Jung"
- 2002 - Ralph Santolla "Shaolin Monks in the Temple of Metal"
- 2002 - Lana Lane "Project Sangri-la"
- 2005 - UFO "Showtime" DVD
- 2011 - HELP!
- 2013 - Nergard "Memorial For a Wish"
- 2011 - Nitrogods "Nitrogods"
- 2014 - Thomsen - "Unbroken"
- 2018 - Nergard "Memorial For a Wish" new version
