= The Empire of Future =

Studio album by Silent Force
- Released: 2000
- Genre: Power metal
- Length: 52:39
- Label: Massacre Records (Europe); Victor Entertainment (Japan/Asia); NTS (France); Moria Records (South America)
- Producer: Alex Beyrodt, Dennis Ward

Silent Force chronology
The Empire of Future (2000)	Infatuator (2001)

The Empire of Future is the debut studio album released by Silent Force. It was rated an 82 out of 100 by MetalReviews.com.

== Track listing ==
All songs written by Alex Beyrodt and D.C. Cooper, except when noted.

1. "The Beginning" – 2:58
2. "Live for the Day" – 5:44
3. "Empire of Future" – 6:22
4. "Saints And Sinners" – 4:59
5. "Tell Me Why" – 4:44
6. "New Experiment" – 6:56
7. "Six Past The Hour" – 4:44 (Beyrodt, Michael Bormann, Cooper)
8. "Broken Wings" – 5:04 (Beyrodt, Cooper, André Hilgers)
9. "We Must Remain" – 5:11
10. "I'll Be There" - 5:57 (Beyrodt, Cooper, Günter Werno)
11. "See Beyond" - 5:34 (Japanese bonus track) (Beyrodt, Hilgers, Cooper)
12. "Saints And Sinners (Acoustic)" - 5:46 (2007 remastered release)

== Personnel ==
- D.C. Cooper - vocals
- Alex Beyrodt - guitars
- Thorsten Fleisch - bass
- Torsten Röhre - keyboards
- André Hilgers - drums

=== Guest musicians ===
- Frank Rössler - keyboards
- Günther Werno - piano on track 10
- David Readman - backing vocals
- Maria Kern - backing vocals
- Michael Müller - additional bass

== Production ==
- Produced by Alex Beyrodt and Dennis Ward (musician) at House of Music Studio and House Of Audio
- Mixed by Alex Beyrodt and Achim Köhler at House of Music Studio
- Track 10 produced by Dennis Ward and D.C. Cooper
