= Rising from Ashes (album) =

Studio album by Silent Force
- Released: December 13, 2013 (Standard and limited edition); December 11, 2013 (Japanese edition)
- Genre: Power metal
- Length: 44:40 (Standard edition); 47:35 (Limited edition); 48:47 (Japanese edition)
- Label: AFM Records (Standard and limited edition); Nexes and Seven Seas (Japanese edition)
- Producer: Alex Beyrodt

Silent Force chronology
Walk the Earth (2007)	Rising from Ashes (2013)

Professional ratings
Review scores
Source	Rating
Brave Words & Bloody Knuckles	7/10 stars
Metal Hammer Germany	5/7 stars
Get Ready to Rock!	3.5/5 stars
Metal Storm	8/10 stars

Rising from Ashes is the fifth album by German power metal band Silent Force, released on December 13, 2013, via AFM Records. It is their first album since Walk the Earth in 2007. It was produced by Beyrodt himself and it was the first and only album also with singer Michael Bormann (Jaded Heart), bass guitarist Mat Sinner (Primal Fear, (Sinner (band) Voodoo Circle) and Italian keyboardist Alessandro Del Vecchio (Hardline, Jorn, Edge of Forever), respectively instead of D. C. Cooper (returned to Royal Hunt), Jürgen Steinmetz and Torsten Röhre.

The album was preceded by the single "Circle of Trust" on December 4, 2013.

== Track listing ==
All songs written by Alex Beyrodt and Michael Bormann.

No.	Title	Length
1.	"Caught In Their Wicked Game"	4:39
2.	"There Ain't No Justice"	4:55
3.	"Circle Of Trust"	4:39
4.	"Living To Die"	4:47
5.	"Before You Run"	4:31
6.	"You Gotta Kick It"	4:10
7.	"Turn Me Loose"	5:06
8.	"Born To Be A Fighter"	3:39
9.	"Anytime Anywhere"	4:22
10.	"Kiss Of Death"	3:52
Total length:		44:40

Limited edition bonus track
No.	Title	Length
11.	"I'm Gonna Rescue You"	2:55

Limited edition bonus track
No.	Title	Length
11.	"Raise Your Hands"	4:07

== Personnel ==
- Michael Bormann – vocals
- Alex Beyrodt – guitars, producing
- Mat Sinner – bass guitar
- Alessandro Del Vecchio – keyboards
- André Hilgers – drums

=== Additional personnel ===
- Level 10 Music – management
- Achim Köhler – mixing
- Ubikmedia – video editing
- Felipe Machado – cover
- Hiko – artwork
