= Whisky Fingers =

Whiskey Fingers

Studio album by Voodoo Circle
- Released: November 27, 2015
- Studio: Dream Team Studios, Tilburg, Germany; Voodoo Vibes Studio, Brüggen, Germany; Level 10 Studio, Ostfildern, Germany; Ivorytears Music Works, Somma Lombardo, Italy
- Genre: Hard rock
- Length: 50:51 (International edition); 55:13 (limited edition)
- Label: AFM Records
- Producer: Alex Beyrodt

Voodoo Circle chronology
More Than One Way Home (2013)	Whiskey Fingers (2015)	Raised on Rock (2018)

Singles from Whisky Fingers
- 1. "Trapped in Paradise" Released: November 10, 2015

Whisky Fingers is the fourth studio album by German hard rock band Alex Beyrodt's Voodoo Circle. It was released on November 27, 2015 via AFM Records, and it was produced by Alex Beyrodt. It was the last album with lead singer David Readman, then substituted by Herbie Langhans, the first with Italian drummer Francesco Jovino, instead of Tim Husung, and the only with multi-instrumentalist Alessandro Del Vecchio on keyboards and vocals.

The album was preceded by the release of the single, "Trapped in Paradise", on November 15, 2015.

== Track listing ==
All songs written by Alessandro Del Vecchio, Alex Beyrodt, David Readman, Mat Sinner except where noted.

No.	Title	Writer(s)	Length
1.	"Trapped in Paradise"		4:15
2.	"Heartbreaking Woman"	Beyrodt, Readman	4:21
3.	"Watch and Wait (I Got My Eye on You)"		6:21
4.	"Medicine Man"		5:18
5.	"The Day the Walls Came Down"	Beyrodt, Readman	3:44
6.	"Heart of Stone"		3:54
7.	"Straight Shooter"		4:30
8.	"The Rhythm of My Heart"	Beyrodt, Readman	6:58
9.	"Devil Takes Me Down"		3:16
10.	"5 O' Clock"		3:40
11.	"Been Said and Done"		4:34
Total length:			50:51

Limited edition bonus track
No.	Title	Length
12.	"Coming Home to You"	4:22
13.	"Trapped in Paradise" (enhanced video)

Japanese edition bonus track
No.	Title	Writer(s)	Length
12.	"Ain't No Sunshine"	Bill Withers

== Personnel ==
=== Voodoo Circle ===
- David Readman - vocals
- Alex Beyrodt - guitars, producing, arrangement
- Mat Sinner - bass guitar, co-arrangement
- Alessandro Del Vecchio - keyboards, vocals, co-arrangement, recording, mixing, mastering
- Francesco "Cesco" Jovino - drums

=== Additional personnel ===
- Mattia Stancioiu - drums studio assistant
- Alex Kuehr - photography
- Hiko - artwork
