= Infatuator =

Studio album by Silent Force
- Released: 2001
- Genre: Power metal
- Length: 59:44
- Label: Massacre Records (Europe); Victor Entertainment (Japan/Asia)
- Producer: Alex Beyrodt

Silent Force chronology
The Empire of Future (2000)	Infatuator (2001)	Worlds Apart (2004)

Infatuator is the second studio album released by Silent Force.

== Track listing ==
All songs were written by Alex Beyrodt and D.C. Cooper except tracks 3, 4, 5 and 12 by Beyrodt/Cooper/Hilgers/Röhre/Steinmetz, track 6 by Tipton/Halford/Downing and track 7 by Smolski (performed by the Belorussian State TV and Radio Orchestra).

1. "Infatuator" – 4:46
2. "Fall Into Oblivion" – 5:17
3. "Hear Me Calling (Death by Fascination)" – 5:28
4. "Promised Land" – 5:03
5. "We Must Use the Power" – 6:10
6. "All Guns Blazing" (Judas Priest cover) – 3:27
7. "Cena Libera" (Instrumental) – 0:26
8. "Gladiator" – 4:36
9. "The Blade" – 6:24
10. "Last Time" - 4:48
11. "World Aflame" - 5:26
12. "In Your Arms" - 6:05
13. "Northern Lights" (Instrumental) - 1:48

The Japanese version has "Overture" as track 1 and adds "Pain" as track 11.

== Personnel ==
- D.C. Cooper - vocals
- Alex Beyrodt - guitars
- Jürgen Steinmetz - bass
- Torsten Röhre - keyboards
- André Hilgers - drums

=== Guest musicians ===
- Inka Auhagen - female vocals on track 12

== Production ==
- Produced by Alex Beyrodt
- Engineered, mixed and mastered by Achim Koler at House of Music Studios
- Vocals produced by Victor Smolski, engineered by Ingo Czaikowski at VPS Studios
