= Fair Warning (Fair Warning album) =

Album by Fair Warning

Studio album by Fair Warning
- Released: 19 March 1992
- Genre: Hard rock
- Length: 47:30
- Labels: WEA; WMC5-518
- Producer: Rafe McKenna

Fair Warning chronology
Fair Warning (1992)	Rainmaker (1995)

Fair Warning is the debut studio album released by the hard rock band Fair Warning.

== Track listing ==
All songs written by Ule W. Ritgen except where noted.

1. "Longing For Love" – 3:51
2. "When Love Fails" – 3:43 (Helge Engelke)
3. "The Call of the Heart" – 4:15
4. "Crazy" – 3:50
5. "One Step Closer" – 4:00 (Engelke)
6. "Hang On" – 4:03
7. "Out On the Run" – 3:55
8. "Long Gone" – 4:41
9. "The Eyes of Rock" – 3:47
10. "Take a Look At the Future" – 3:56
11. "The Heat of Emotion" – 3:03 (Zeno Roth)
12. "Take Me Up" – 4:26

== Personnel ==
- Tommy Heart – vocals
- Helge Engelke – guitars, keyboards and backing vocals
- Andy Malecek – guitars
- Ule W. Ritgen – bass guitar and backing vocals
- C. C. Behrens – drums
- Bernd Kluse – backing vocals
- Andrew McDermott – backing vocals
- Kalle Bosel – backing vocals

== Production ==
- Mixing – Rafe McKenna
- Engineer – Frank Wuttke
