= The Final Frontier Tour (Journey) =

2026 concert tour

The Final Frontier
- Tour by Journey
- Location: North America
- Start date: February 28, 2026
- End date: November 28, 2026
- No. of shows: 106

Journey concert chronology
- Freedom Tour (2022–2024); The Final Frontier Tour (2026)

The Final Frontier Tour is the final concert tour by the American rock band Journey. It was announced in November 2025 and began on February 28, 2026 in Hershey, Pennsylvania, and is set to conclude on November 28, 2026 in San Francisco, California.

== Background ==
In September 2025, the band announced a performance at the Stagecoach Festival on April 25, 2026.

In October 2025, longtime Journey keyboardist Jonathan Cain announced he would leave the band after the 2026-2027 tour, citing "I'm coming with an EP at the end of the year. Then, of course, we go on the Journey tour in 2026 – on our farewell Journey tour. So, I'll be saying goodbye to that". He also quoted he wanted to work on his Ministry, quoting "I feel a calling there". Jonathan has been on Keyboards for Journey since 1981, after former Keyboardist Gregg Rolie left the group. "Never in my wildest dreams did I think that I was going to be able to create this kind of lasting longevity when it comes to writing. I'm most proud of my songwriting and my relationship with Steve [Perry], and how we were able to craft these songs with Neal that mean so much to so many people. That's pretty overwhelming to think about," he also said in an interview with Ultimate Classic Rock.

On November 5, the band posted that the new tour would be called "The Final Frontier Tour". The next day, the 2026 tour dates were released, with the tickets going on sale on November 14 at 10am.

On November 7, Neal Schon did an interview with Ultimate Classic Rock, where he talked about the tour. "We're doing 'An Evening with Journey', two full sets with an intermission, there'll be no opener. It's all Journey. So, we're going to be digging into songs we haven't done in decades, plus the anthems that everybody loves". When Schon was asked about this being Journey's ''final'' tour, he stated "I can't really speculate at this point. I'm kind of ready to move on. For one, there's so many tribute bands out there right now playing whatever show we do. That’s why I'm really glad that we're going to change things up here and throw in a lot of loops that people don't expect because there's so many tribute bands out there doing exactly the same show we're doing".

In May, the band added another 40 dates to the tour, ending with a hometown show in San Francisco, California.

== Set list ==
The following set list was performed on February 28, 2026 in Hershey, Pennsylvania. It is not intended to represent a majority of the performances throughout the tour.

1. "Faith in the Heartland"
2. "Only the Young"
3. Guitar Solo
4. "Stone in Love"
5. "Be Good to Yourself"
6. "Just the Same Way"
7. "Lights"
8. "Still They Ride"
9. "Escape"
10. Piano Solo
11. "Who's Crying Now"
12. "Mother, Father"
13. "Suzanne"
14. Guitar Solo
15. "Wheel in the Sky"
16. "Separate Ways (Worlds Apart)"
17. "Feeling That Way"
18. "Anytime"
19. "Dead or Alive"
20. "I'll Be Alright Without You"
21. "Open Arms"
22. "La Do Da" (with teases of "Whole Lotta Love", "Be-Bop-a-Lula" and "Break On Through")
23. "Any Way You Want It"
24. "Lovin', Touchin', Squeezin'"
25. "Faithfully"
26. "Don't Stop Believin'"

== Tour dates ==
List of 2026 concerts, showing date, city, country, and venue
Date (2026)	City	Country	Venue
February 28	Hershey	United States	Giant Center
March 2	Pittsburgh	United States	PPG Paints Arena
March 4	Washington, D.C.	United States	Capital One Arena
March 5	Trenton	United States	CURE Insurance Arena
March 7	Ottawa	Canada	Canadian Tire Centre
March 9	Hamilton	Canada	TD Coliseum
March 12	Quebec City	Canada	Videotron Centre
March 13	Montreal	Canada	Bell Centre
March 16	Columbus	United States	Nationwide Arena
March 17	Indianapolis	United States	Gainbridge Fieldhouse
March 19	Milwaukee	United States	Fiserv Forum
March 21	Memphis	United States	FedEx Forum
March 22	Lexington	United States	Rupp Arena
March 25	North Little Rock	United States	Simmons Bank Arena
March 26	Kansas City	United States	T-Mobile Center
March 28	New Orleans	United States	Smoothie King Center
March 29	Bossier City	United States	Brookshire Grocery Arena
March 31	Austin	United States	Moody Center
April 3	Oklahoma City	United States	Paycom Center
April 4	Wichita	United States	Intrust Bank Arena
April 6	Sioux Falls	United States	Denny Sanford Premier Center
April 8	Des Moines	United States	Casey's Center
April 9	Lincoln	United States	Pinnacle Bank Arena
April 12	Salt Lake City	United States	Delta Center
April 14	Boise	United States	ExtraMile Arena
April 15	Spokane	United States	Spokane Arena
April 17	Vancouver	Canada	Pacific Coliseum
April 19	Eugene	United States	Matthew Knight Arena
April 21	Sacramento	United States	Golden 1 Center
April 22	Bakersfield	United States	Dignity Health Arena
April 24	Fresno	United States	Save Mart Center
April 25	Indio	United States	Stagecoach Festival
May 15	Tampa	United States	Benchmark International Arena
May 16	Jacksonville	United States	VyStar Veterans Memorial Arena
May 18	Columbia	United States	Colonial Life Arena
May 20	Charlotte	United States	Spectrum Center
May 21	Greensboro	United States	First Horizon Coliseum
May 23	Atlantic City	United States	Boardwalk Hall
May 24	Hartford	United States	PeoplesBank Arena
May 27	University Park	United States	Bryce Jordan Center
May 28	Charlottesville	United States	John Paul Jones Arena
May 30	Knoxville	United States	Thompson-Boling Arena
May 31	Savannah	United States	Enmarket Arena
June 3	Hampton	United States	Hampton Coliseum
June 4	Roanoke	United States	Berglund Center
June 6	Worcester	United States	DCU Center
June 7	Manchester	United States	SNHU Arena
June 10	Buffalo	United States	KeyBank Center
June 11	Allentown	United States	PPL Center
June 13	Cincinnati	United States	Heritage Bank Center
June 14	Grand Rapids	United States	Van Andel Arena
June 17	Evansville	United States	Ford Center
June 18	Fort Wayne	United States	Allen County War Memorial Coliseum
June 20	Champaign	United States	State Farm Center
June 21	Green Bay	United States	Resch Center
June 24	Moline	United States	Vibrant Arena at The MARK
June 25	Springfield	United States	Great Southern Bank Arena
June 27	Tupelo	United States	Cadence Bank Arena
June 28	Lafayette	United States	Cajundome
July 1	Corpus Christi	United States	Hilliard Center
July 2	Laredo	United States	Sames Auto Arena
September 12	Los Angeles	United States	Crypto.com Arena
September 14	San Diego	United States	Pechanga Arena
September 15	Phoenix	United States	Mortgage Matchup Center
September 17	Stockton	United States	Adventist Health Arena
September 19	Portland	United States	Veterans Memorial Coliseum
September 21	Seattle	United States	Climate Pledge Arena
September 24	Edmonton	Canada	Rogers Place
September 26	Calgary	Canada	Scotiabank Saddledome
September 27	Saskatoon	Canada	SaskTel Centre
September 29	Winnipeg	Canada	Canada Life Centre
October 2	Grand Forks	United States	Alerus Center
October 4	Saint Paul	United States	Grand Casino Arena
October 5	Chicago	United States	United Center
October 8	Tulsa	United States	BOK Center
October 10	San Antonio	United States	Frost Bank Center
October 12	Biloxi	United States	Mississippi Coast Coliseum
October 13	Birmingham	United States	Legacy Arena
October 16	Sunrise	United States	Amerant Bank Arena
October 17	Orlando	United States	Kia Center
October 19	Atlanta	United States	State Farm Arena
October 21	Nashville	United States	Bridgestone Arena
October 22	Louisville	United States	KFC Yum! Center
October 24	Baltimore	United States	CFG Bank Arena
October 25	Newark	United States	Prudential Center
October 28	Philadelphia	United States	Xfinity Mobile Arena
October 29	Providence	United States	Amica Mutual Pavilion
November 2	Detroit	United States	Little Caesars Arena
November 4	Toronto	Canada	Scotiabank Arena
November 6	Wilkes-Barre	United States	Mohegan Arena at Casey Plaza
November 7	Uniondale	United States	Nassau Coliseum
November 10	Boston	United States	TD Garden
November 12	Cleveland	United States	Rocket Arena
November 14	Greenville	United States	Bon Secours Wellness Arena
November 16	St. Louis	United States	Enterprise Center
November 18	Houston	United States	Toyota Center
November 20	Dallas	United States	American Airlines Center
November 22	Denver	United States	Ball Arena
November 24	Anaheim	United States	Honda Center
November 27	Las Vegas	United States	MGM Grand Garden Arena
November 28	San Francisco	United States	Chase Center

== Personnel ==
- Neal Schon – lead guitar, backing vocals
- Arnel Pineda – lead vocals
- Jonathan Cain – lead keyboards, guitar, vocals
- Todd Jensen – bass, backing vocals
- Deen Castronovo – drums, vocals
- Jason Derlatka – backing keyboards, vocals
