= Wild Dogs =

American heavy metal band

- Origin: Portland, Oregon
- Genres: Heavy metal, power metal, speed metal
- Years active: 1981–present
- Labels: Matchbox, Shrapnel Usmetal
- Members: Matt McCourt; Robert Robinson; Troy Stutzman; Nick Superchi
- Past members: Jeff Mark; Danny Kurth; Pete Holmes; Rik Bartel; Tom Möeller; Michael Furlong; Deen Castronovo

Wild Dogs is an American heavy metal band from Portland, Oregon, formed loosely in 1981 by original members Jeff Mark, Danny Kurth, Matt McCourt, and Pete Holmes. The band has since released six albums, three live albums and one DVD. Wild Dogs rose to local and regional recognition in the 1980s as a pioneer of metal in the Pacific Northwest, followed by international recognition after the release of their second album.

Wild Dogs has experienced numerous line-up changes. McCourt is the only original and constant member of the band (with the exception of the Reign of Terror album, on which Michael Furlong replaced him). Several attempts to reunite most of the original band members have failed, most recently in July 2010. McCourt has kept the band active for over 30 years, playing local and regional shows and international festivals with various band members. He continues to reproduce CDs and do interviews for fanzines and radio stations.

== History ==
In mid-1981, Jeff Mark, Mick Zane, Pete Holmes and Matt McCourt teamed up to perform in Portland as the Ravers, promoting McCourt's release of "I Was a Teenage Rock 'n' Roller" on Matchbox Records.

Guitarist Mark, drummer Holmes, vocalist McCourt and bassist Danny Kurth were asked to record a few songs for a recording class at Recording Associates. The first session produced "Fugitive of the Law", which also featured local guitarist Kip Doran. The second session produced "We Got the Power", "Runnin Away", and "Tonight We Rock". The third session proved to be the turning point. Drummer Pete Holmes was lured away by the band Black 'n Blue and was replaced by Black n Blue frontman Jaime St. James. The next session yielded "The Tonight Show", "Life is a Game", "I Need a Love to Call My Own", "Two Wrongs", and the song included on a local FM radio station (KGON) compilation album, Born to Rock.

McCourt saw a one-time news segment on MTV about Shrapnel Records president Mike Varney, who was searching for unsung guitar heroes. Jeff Mark was known as one of the most notable guitarists in Portland. McCourt sent Varney a demo of their recording sessions with Recording Associates. Varney offered an appearance on his compilation series. The band originally named themselves DMZ, but changed it to Wild Dogs after being inspired by two old hound dogs that the band passed daily, on the stairwell at their practice studio.

After the release of US Metal Vol 2, McCourt suggested to Shrapnel that they produce a full album with the band with the best response. Varney suggested Wild Dogs, since there was most of an album recorded. However, Pete Holmes left the band to join Black n Blue in Hollywood, so the band was left with the task of finding a drummer. McCourt recruited local, 16-year-old drummer Deen Castronovo to join the band. The first album was released and the band had its first gig on August 20, 1982 in San Francisco at The Stone, with Culprit and Varney's band Cinema, leading to another MTV news segment. The following week the band played in Seattle, sharing the bill with TKO, Rail, Atom Bomb and Myth (fronted by Geoff Tate before he joined Queensrÿche). They later toured with Slayer, Metal Church, Anthrax, Dio, Raven and Girlschool. Wild Dogs became known for their live show. With McCourt's use of spiked baseball bats, blow up dolls and other props, and Castronovo's twirling and stick juggling showmanship, the band earned its wild, bad boy reputation.

== Discography ==
- Wild Dogs (Shrapnel, 1983)
- Man's Best Friend (Shrapnel, 1984)
- Reign of Terror (Enigma, 1987)
- King of the World 2002
- Down and Dirty 2004
- Live at the Roseland 2004
- Atomic Thunder 2006
- Live at Headbangers Open Air 2009
- Live in San Francisco 1982 2014
- Born To Rock Forever 2015
- Evolution 2016
