= Revolution Saints =

Band

- Genre: Hard rock
- Years active: 2014–present
- Label: Frontiers
- Members: Deen Castronovo; Joel Hoekstra; Jeff Pilson
- Past members: Doug Aldrich; Jack Blades
- Website: http://www.revolutionsaints.com/

Revolution Saints is an American supergroup conceptualized by Frontiers Records president Serafino Perugino, and formed by Jack Blades of Night Ranger; Deen Castronovo of Journey; and Doug Aldrich of Whitesnake and Dio.

The band has collaborated from the beginning with Italian multi-instrumentalist Alessandro Del Vecchio as producer, sound engineer, keyboardist, and songwriter.

Their self-titled debut album was released on February 24, 2015. Their second album, Light in the Dark, was released on October 13, 2017. The album was ranked #8 on Dr. Music's 2017 "Album of the Year" list.

On November 20, 2019, their third album called Rise was revealed. It was released on January 24, 2020.

In 2022, Blades and Aldrich left the band, and Joel Hoekstra and Jeff Pilson joined. The new lineup released a single, "Eagle Flight", on November 28, 2022 and announced a new studio album with the same name to be released in the first half of 2023. Subsequently on January 6, 2023 they released an official music video for the new single, "Need Each Other".

== Band members ==
- Deen Castronovo – vocals, drums (2014–present)
- Joel Hoekstra – guitars (2022–present)
- Jeff Pilson – bass, backing vocals (2022–present)

=== Former members ===
- Doug Aldrich – guitar, backing vocals (2014–2022)
- Jack Blades – bass, vocals (2014–2022)

=== Touring members ===
- Alessandro Del Vecchio – keyboards, piano, vocals (also session member)
- Steve Toomey – drums

== Discography ==
=== Studio albums ===
Year	Album	Peak positions				Certification
Year	Album	US	GER	SWE	SWI	Certification
2015	Revolution Saints	198	66	54	33	
2017	Light in the Dark	—	90	—	39	
2020	Rise	—	61	—	18	
2023	Eagle Flight	—	—	—	31	
2024	Against the Winds	—	—	—	—	
