= Deen Castronovo =

American drummer and singer

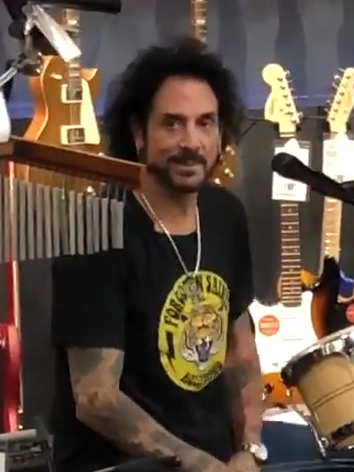
- Castronovo in 2018

Background information
- Born: Deen Joseph Castronovo; August 17, 1964 (age 62); Westminster, California, U.S.
- Genres: Hard rock; heavy metal; speed metal; neoclassical metal
- Occupation: Musician
- Instruments: Drums; vocals
- Years active: 1982–present
- Member of: Journey; Revolution Saints
- Formerly of: The Dead Daisies; Bad English; Dr. Mastermind; Wild Dogs; Cacophony; Hardline; Planet Us; Soul SirkUS; GZR; Ozzy Osbourne

Deen Joseph Castronovo (born August 17, 1964) is an American drummer and singer best known for being a member of hard rock acts Bad English, Hardline and Journey. He plays drums and sings for the bands Journey, Generation Radio, and Revolution Saints. He has also played for Ozzy Osbourne, Steve Vai, Paul Rodgers, and GZR, with Black Sabbath's Geezer Butler.

== Early life ==
Deen Castronovo was born in the city of Westminster, California and started drumming at the age of 6. He grew up in Salem, Oregon, where he attended South Salem High School. Deen cites Steve Smith, Neil Peart, Terry Bozzio, Peter Criss, John Bonham, Alex Van Halen, Kiss, Rush, Van Halen, Led Zeppelin, Phil Collins and AC/DC as musical influences.

== Career ==
Castronovo is the former drummer for bands Wild Dogs, Bad English, Hardline, Ozzy Osbourne, and GZR. He plays drums and shares lead vocals for the bands Revolution Saints and Journey.

=== Wild Dogs (1982–1987) ===
Wild Dogs is an American rock band from Portland, Oregon formed loosely in 1981 by Jeff Mark, Danny Kurth, Matt McCourt, and Pete Holmes. Drummer Pete Holmes was lured away by Black 'n Blue and was replaced by Jaime St. James. The band had an appearance on a compilation series, but before a full album could be recorded with Shrapnel Records, St. James left the band to also join Black 'n Blue. It was at this point Deen was first discovered by McCourt, who recruited the then 16-year-old drummer Castronovo to join the band.

Castronovo played on the self-titled debut album Wild Dogs (1983), the followup Man's Best Friend (1984) and Reign Of Terror (1987).

=== Bad English (1987–1991) ===
While working with Wild Dogs, Castronovo met and began working with Tony MacAlpine, which led to an introduction to future long-time collaboration partner, Neal Schon. Shortly after, Neal would invite Castronovo to audition for a new band with Jonathan Cain, John Waite and Ricky Phillips, which became Bad English. After two albums, which included being nominated for Best New Group in 1989 at the International Rock Awards, Bad English disbanded in 1991.

=== Hardline (1991–1992) ===
Again working with Neal Schon, Castronovo played drums and sang backing vocals on Hardline's debut album Double Eclipse. The album's first single "Takin' Me Down" peaked at No. 37 on Billboard's Hot Mainstream Rock Tracks chart. The album's second single, a cover of the Danny Spanos song "Hot Cherie," rose to No. 25 on the Hot Mainstream Rock Tracks chart.

=== Ozzy Osbourne (1995) ===
Castronovo appeared on the 1995 release Ozzmosis, the seventh solo studio album by Ozzy Osbourne. The album reached number 22 on the UK Albums Chart and number four on the US Billboard 200. Castronovo also toured with Ozzy on a portion of the 1995 leg of the Retirement Sucks Tour.

=== Journey (1998–2015, 2021–present) ===
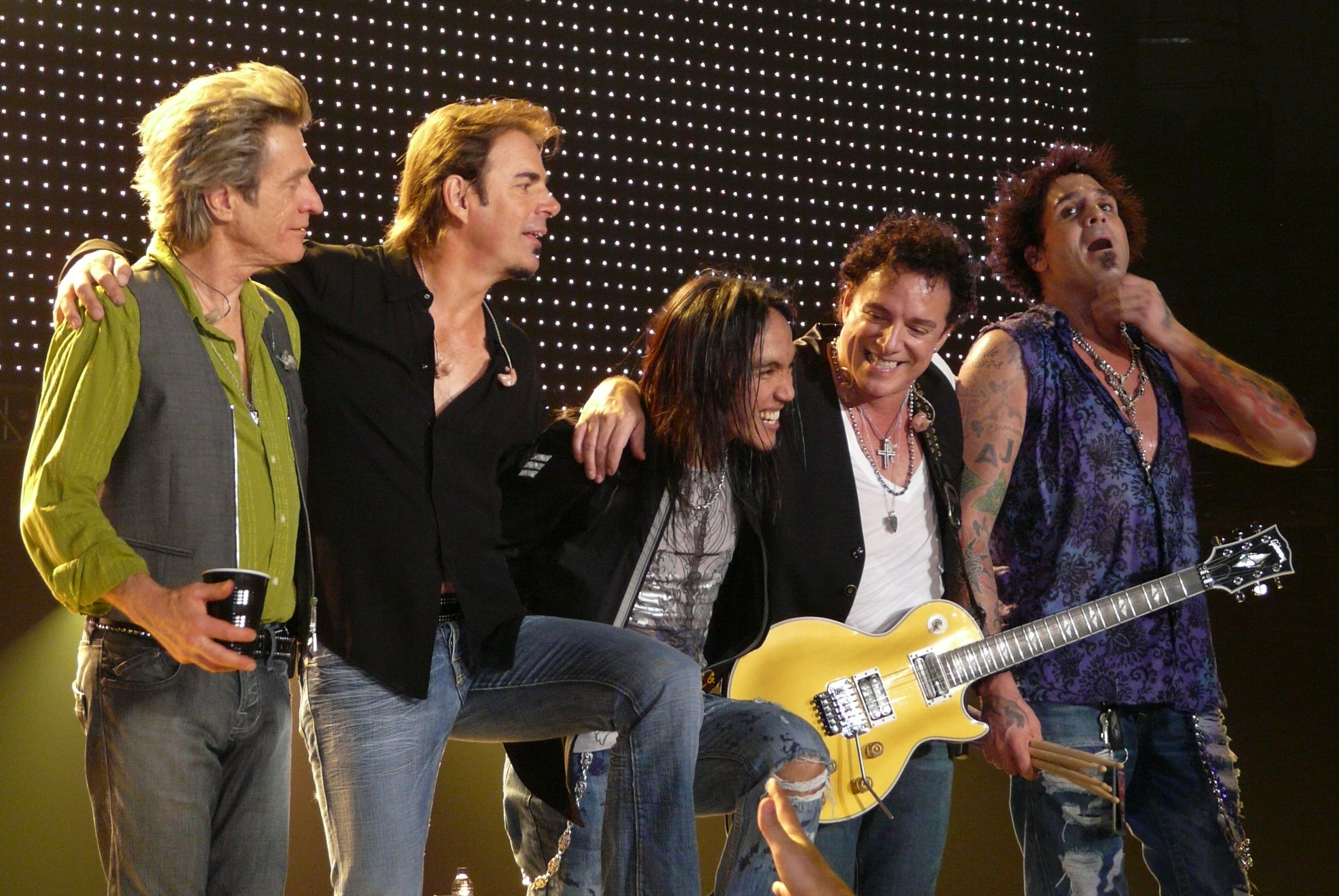
Castronovo (far right) with Journey, live in Minneapolis, Minnesota in 2008

Castronovo continued to be in various bands along with Schon, from Hardline to Paul Rodgers. After a three-year stint with Vasco Rossi, he joined Journey, where he would spend the next 18 years and 5 albums as the drummer, backing and occasional lead vocalist. As a vocalist, he sang "Still They Ride", "Mother, Father" and "Keep On Runnin'" (and on rare occasions, "Faithfully" and "Where Were You") in concert in order to let the main lead vocalists take a break. In the studio, he performed lead vocals on "A Better Life" and "Never Too Late" on Generations, as well as "After Glow" on Freedom.

Castronovo was fired by Journey in August 2015 following a June 2015 domestic violence arrest. He was replaced by Omar Hakim on the band's 2015 tour, with longtime drummer Steve Smith subsequently rejoining the band.

In July 2021, Schon confirmed Castronovo's return to Journey as a second drummer alongside Narada Michael Walden. Following Walden's departure from the group in 2022, he became the sole drummer once again, though they both still appear on Freedom.

In Mid-November 2026 Schon confirmed on his social media accounts that "After careful consideration and an extensive year of touring, our talented, longtime drummer Deen Castronovo has decided to step away to focus on personal health matters that require his attention. " Schon went on to say "Steve Murphy...will be joining us for the remainder of November." The 2026 leg of Journey's The Final Frontier Tour is scheduled to end in November.

=== Soul SirkUS (2004–2005) ===
Castronovo was invited by Neil Schon to join the band Soul SirkUS. The band began rehearsing and eventually recorded 11 songs for their debut album, World Play. Although all the foundation tracks on the album were originally written for Planet Us, only one completed song from that band was used for Soul SirkUS debut.

In early 2005, with a completed album titled World Play (the "black sleeve" version), the band was ready to tour, but Castronovo fell ill due to extreme exhaustion. Soon after, Castronovo bowed out of Soul SirkUS based on his doctor's recommendation and was replaced by Australian drummer Virgil Donati.

Ultimately there were three editions of the album. The Black Sleeve version was the original with Castronovo drumming, the Green Sleeve version was an American edition remastered, the Yellow Sleeve had two versions: a European edition of remaster that included a bonus DVD, and a Japanese edition of the remaster included a bonus track. The Black Sleeve version is the only one in which Castronovo appears.

=== Revolution Saints (2014–present) ===
While still with Journey, Castronovo, Jack Blades (Night Ranger, Damn Yankees and Shaw Blades), and Doug Aldrich (Whitesnake, Dio, The Dead Daisies) formed Revolution Saints. The band, where Deen served as lead vocalist and handled drumming duties, released its self-titled debut album on February 24, 2015. A follow-up album, Light in the Dark, was released on October 13, 2017. The album was ranked #8 on Dr. Music's 2017 "Album of the Year" list. This was followed by Restless Spirits in 2019.

In 2022, Blades and Aldrich left the band and were replaced with Jeff Pilson and Joel Hoekstra. This lineup released Eagle Flight in 2023, and Against the Winds in 2024.

=== Gioeli-Castronovo (2017–present) ===
Johnny Gioeli and Castronovo first played together on the debut Hardline album, Double Eclipse, which was released in 1992. 25 years later, the two were reunited in Italy to commence work on the debut Gioeli-Castronovo album, Set The World On Fire, available July 13, 2018.

=== Generation Radio (2020–2021) ===
In 2020, Castronovo joined the supergroup, Generation Radio. He played drums and shared lead vocals with Jay DeMarcus (Keyboards), Jason Scheff (Bass), Chris Rodriguez (Guitar), and Tom Yankton (Guitar). The band performed their first live concert on October 28, 2020, in Nashville, TN. All proceeds from the concert benefited the ACM Lifting Lives COVID Relief Fund. The group released its debut album on August 12, 2022. He left Generation Radio to rejoin Journey and was replaced on drums by Steve Ferrone.

=== Other projects ===
Castronovo's first big gig came at the age of 16 with a band called The Enemy, who opened up for bands like Blue Öyster Cult and Foghat. He has played in Cacophony, Dr. Mastermind, Planet Us (a short-lived supergroup with Sammy Hagar, Michael Anthony, Joe Satriani and Neal Schon), Social Distortion, and GZR (formed by Black Sabbath bassist Geezer Butler), as well as in backing bands for Vasco Rossi, Paul Rodgers, and Matthew Ward.

He also played on the song "Smoke of the Revolution" on the Neal Schon solo album Late Nite (1989).

After working with Paul Rodgers, he began doing session work with Steve Vai, with whom he made two albums. Steve later called for him to audition for Ozzy Osbourne, which resulted in him recording Ozzmosis and doing a South American Tour with Ozzy. After Ozzy, he began doing session work for producer Michael Beinhorn, recording with Social Distortion, Geezer Butler's solo project and Hole.

He has released an instructional video entitled "High Performance Drumming" in 1991, and has been involved with the Boys & Girls Club of Salem.

In 2019, he toured with guitarist Neal Schon on the "Journey Through Time" tour, which features former members of Journey performing songs from the band's entire discography (including some no longer performed by the official Journey). He acted as the drummer and shares lead vocal duties with keyboardist Gregg Rolie.

== Personal life ==
Castronovo was arrested on June 14, 2015, and charged with fourth-degree assault and menacing after police say he physically injured a woman. As a result, he was dropped immediately from upcoming Journey performances and ultimately replaced by Omar Hakim on the band's 2015 tour. On June 29, 2015, Castronovo was indicted by a Marion County grand jury on felony charges of rape, assault, sexual abuse, unlawful use of a dangerous weapon, and contempt of court (violation of terms of bail after the June 14 arrest). With nine of the original charges dismissed, Castronovo pleaded guilty to six charges and received a suspended sentence and four years of probation. Castronovo has since recovered from addiction and states he is sober. He said in 2023, "I'm doing great, clean and sober, working hard, doing what I need to do – and I put God first, family second. My job is third, where before it was all the other way around."

== Discography ==
Year	Band	Title	Notes
1983	Wild Dogs	Wild Dogs	Drums
1984	Wild Dogs	Man's Best Friend	Drums
1986	Dr. Mastermind	Dr. Mastermind	Drums
1987	Wild Dogs	Reign of Terror	Drums
1987	Tony MacAlpine	Maximum Security	Drums on "Autumn Lords", "Hundreds of Thousands", "Tears of Sahara", "The Time and the Test" and "The King's Cup"
1988	Cacophony	Go Off!	Session drums
1988	Marty Friedman	Dragon's Kiss	Drums
1989	Bad English	Bad English	Drums, percussion, backing vocals
1990	Joey Tafolla	Infra-blue	Drums
1990	Matthew Ward	Fortress	Drums
1991	Bad English	Backlash	Drums, backing vocals
1992	Hardline	Double Eclipse	Drums, backing vocals
1993	Paul Rodgers	The Hendrix Set	EP live: Drums
1994	Tony MacAlpine	Premonition	Drums
1995	GZR	Plastic Planet	Drums
1995	Frederiksen/Phillips	Frederiksen/Phillips	Drums
1995	Ozzy Osbourne	Ozzmosis	Drums
1995	Steve Vai	Alien Love Secrets	EP: drums on "Die to Live", "The Boy from Seattle", "Kill the Guy with the Ball" and "Tender Surrender"
1996	Steve Vai	Fire Garden	Drums on "Dyin' Day", "Blowfish", "Hand on Heart", "Little Alligator", "All About Eve" and "Damn You"
1996	James Murphy	Convergence	Drums
1996	Social Distortion	White Light, White Heat, White Trash	Uncredited drums
1997	George Bellas	Turn of the Millennium	Drums
1997	GZR	Black Science	Drums
1998	Hole	Celebrity Skin	Uncredited session drums
1998	George Bellas	Mind over Matter	Drums
1998	Steve Vai	Flex-Able Leftovers	Drums on "Natural Born Boy" (Bonus Ed. 1998)
1999	James Murphy	Feeding the Machine	Drums
2000	Journey	Arrival	Drums, backing vocals
2002	Journey	Red 13	EP: drums, percussion, backing vocals
2002	Vasco Rossi	Tracks	Live: drums
2004	Soul SirkUS	Soul SirkUS	Drums, backing vocals - only on original version
2005	Journey	Generations	Drums, percussion, backing vocals, lead vocals on "A Better Life" and bonus track "Never Too Late"
2008	Journey	Revelation	Drums, percussion, backing vocals
2009	Vasco Rossi	Tracks 2	Live: drums
2011	Journey	Eclipse	Drums, percussion, backing vocals
2015	Revolution Saints	Revolution Saints	Vocals, drums
2015	Fear Factory	Genexus	Drums on "Soul Hacker"
2015	Nando Bonini, Deen Castronovo, Lorenzo Poli	Tatanaakoo	Drums
2016	Jonathan Cain	What God Wants to Hear	Drums
2017	Revolutions Saints	Light in the Dark	Vocals, drums
2018	The Dead Daisies	Burn It Down	Drums, backing vocals
2018	Gioeli-Castronovo	Set The World On Fire	Vocals, drums
2018	Tourniquet	Gazing at Medusa	Lead vocals on "Gazing at Medusa"
2018	Issa	Sacrifice Me	drums
2019	Restless Spirits	Restless Spirits	Drums, vocals on "Unbreakable", "Calling You" and "Live to Win"
2020	Revolution Saints	Rise	Vocals, drums
2021	Jeff Scott Soto	Coming Home	drums
2022	Journey	Freedom	lead vocals on "After Glow"
2022	Generation Radio	Generation Radio (Self-titled album)	Vocals, drums
2023	Revolution Saints	Eagle Flight	Vocals, drums
2024	Revolution Saints	Against the Winds	Vocals, drums
