= The Cage (Tony Martin and Dario Mollo album) =

Studio album by Tony Martin and Dario Mollo
- Released: 27 May 1999 (Japan); 28 June 1999 (Europe)
- Recorded: 1998
- Genre: Hard rock
- Length: 50:12
- Label: Ranch Life
- Producer: Dario Mollo and Kit Woolven

Tony Martin and Dario Mollo chronology
The Cage (1999)	The Cage 2 (2002)

The Cage is the first album by guitarist Dario Mollo and former Black Sabbath vocalist Tony Martin.

== Track listing ==
All tracks are written by Dario Mollo/Tony Martin unless stated otherwise

No.	Title	Writer(s)	Length
1.	"Cry Myself to Death"		4:11
2.	"Time to Kill"		4:40
3.	"The Cage/If You Believe"	Mollo/Martin/Airey	6:22
4.	"Relax"		4:31
5.	"Smoke and Mirrors"		4:43
6.	"Infinity"		5:46
7.	"Dead Man Dancin'"		5:38
8.	"This Kind of Love"		4:09
9.	"Stormbringer" (Deep Purple cover)	Blackmore/Coverdale	4:15
10.	"Soul Searching"	Mollo/Maugeri/Martin	5:52

== Personnel ==
Band Members

- Tony Martin – vocals
- Dario Mollo – lead guitar
- Fulvio Gaslini – bass
- Ezio Secomandi – drums
- Don Airey – keyboards
- Elio Maugeri – backing vocals

Production

- Kit Woolven – production
- Dario Mollo – production, cover art
