= Dario Mollo =

Italian guitarist and record producer

- Born: Italy
- Genres: Hard rock, heavy metal
- Occupation(s): Musician, producer
- Instrument(s): Guitar, bass, keyboards
- Years active: 1981–present
- Labels: Frontiers Records
- Website: dariomollo.com

Dario Mollo is an Italian guitarist and record producer, perhaps best known for the three "Cage" albums he recorded with former Black Sabbath singer Tony Martin and his work with former Deep Purple singer/bassist Glenn Hughes (as Voodoo Hill).

== Biography ==
Mollo's first band was Crossbones, which he joined in 1981 and found some degree of success in their native Italy. In 1986, Mollo met English producer Kit Woolven, who produced his first album in 1989, followed by a tour across Europe. After leaving Crossbones to pursue other projects, Mollo opened his own recording studio (Damage, Inc), in Ventimiglia, Italy, where he has worked with numerous artists as a producer and engineer, including Aldo Giuntini and Lacuna Coil.

During this time, Mollo continued to write and record his own music and, after being introduced to Tony Martin in 1998, released The Cage with him in 1999. Well received by critics and the public, Mollo and Martin released two follow-up albums: The Cage 2 in 2002 and The Third Cage in 2012. In between working with Martin, Mollo also released three albums with Glenn Hughes under the name Voodoo Hill: their self-titled debut in 2000, Wild Seed of Mother Earth in 2004, and Waterfall in 2015.

Mollo is currently involved in Tony Martin's live band, Headless Cross. The new Headless Cross line-up played their first ever show on 27 July 2012, at The Asylum nightclub in Birmingham. The set included material from the pair's Cage albums together.

== Discography ==
=== with Crossbones ===
- Demo (1984)
- Crossbones (1989)
- Rock the cradle (2016)

=== with Tony Martin ===
- The Cage (1999)
- The Cage 2 (2002)
- The Third Cage (2012)

=== with Voodoo Hill (with Glenn Hughes) ===
- Voodoo Hill (2000)
- Wild Seed of Mother Earth (2004)
- Waterfall (2015)

=== with EZoo (with Graham Bonnet) ===
- Feeding the Beast (2017)

=== Guest musician ===
- Sharon – Skintight (1990)
- Wine Spirit – Bombs Away (2001)
- Night Cloud – Defeated by the Innocents (2004)
- Wicked Machine – Wicked Machine (2011)
- Alcatrazz – Born Innocent (2020)
