= Silent Force =

German power metal band

- Origin: Krefeld, Germany
- Genre: Power metal
- Years active: 1999–2013
- Labels: AFM, Frontiers, Noise
- Members: Michael Bormann; Alex Beyrodt; Mat Sinner; André Hilgers; Alessandro Del Vecchio
- Past members: D. C. Cooper; Jürgen Steinmetz; Torsten Röhre; Thorsten Fleisch
- Website: silent-force.rocks.de

Silent Force was a German power metal band with neoclassical and progressive influences, founded by guitarist Alex Beyrodt.

== Band history ==
The band was formed in 1999 by German guitarist Alex Beyrodt (Sinner, Primal Fear, Voodoo Circle, The Sygnet) and American singer D.C. Cooper (of Royal Hunt fame). In 2000 their debut album The Empire of Future was released; along with Beyrodt and Cooper there were also Torsten Röhre on keyboards, André Hilgers (who will later play with Rage) and Thorsten Fleisch on bass. In 2001 their second studio album, Infatuator was released by Massacre Records with the addition of Jürgen Steinmetz replacing Fleisch on bass. In 2004 the band moved to Noise Records and with them they released their third studio album Worlds Apart. Their fourth album Walk the Earth was released in February 2007 on AFM Records. In 2013, after a seven-year hiatus, the fifth album is a comeback for the band with a new line-up, featuring vocalist Michael Bormann, bassist Mat Sinner and keyboard player Alessandro Del Vecchio joining the band with Beyrodt and Hilgers retaining their positions. The album title is Rising from Ashes.

== Members ==
- Alex Beyrodt – guitars
- André Hilgers – drums
- Michael Bormann – vocals
- Mat Sinner – bass
- Alessandro Del Vecchio – keyboards

=== Former members ===
- D. C. Cooper – vocals
- Jürgen Steinmetz – bass
- Torsten Röhre – keyboards
- Thorsten Fleisch – bass

== Discography ==
- The Empire of Future (2000)
- Infatuator (2001)
- Worlds Apart (2004)
- Walk the Earth (2007)
- Rising from Ashes (2013)
