= Rainmaker (Fair Warning album) =

Studio album by Fair Warning
- Released: 28 April 1995
- Genre: Hard rock
- Length: 60:35
- Labels: WEA; WMC5-518
- Producer: Fair Warning

Fair Warning chronology
| Fair Warning (1992) | Rainmaker (1995) | Go! (1997) |

Rainmaker is the second studio album released by the hard rock band Fair Warning.

== Track listing ==
All songs written by Ule W. Ritgen except where noted.

1. "The Heart of Summer" – 3:45
2. "Don't Give Up" – 4:11 (Engelke)
3. "Burning Heart" – 3:53
4. "Rain Song" – 3:50
5. "Get a Little Closer" – 4:16
6. "Desert Song" – 6:48
7. "What Did You Find" – 4:59 (Engelke)
8. "Pictures of Love" – 4:40
9. "Lonely Rooms" – 4:56 (Engelke)
10. "One Way Up" – 3:32
11. "Angel of Dawn" – 3:55
12. "Stars and the Moon" – 4:11 (Helge Engelke)
13. "Desolation Angels" – 3:37
14. "The Call of the Wild - 3:48
15. "Too Late For Love" – 4:02

== Personnel ==
- Tommy Heart – vocals
- Helge Engelke – guitars, keyboards and backing vocals
- Andy Malecek – guitars and backing vocals
- Ule W. Ritgen – bass guitar and backing vocals
- C. C. Behrens – drums
