= Fair Warning (band) =

German musical group

Fair Warning is a German hard rock band founded in 1991 by former V2 vocalist Tommy Heart and former Zeno bassist Ule W. Ritgen. The band was rounded out by guitarists Helge Engelke, Andy Malecek and drummer Jurgen "C.C." Behrens.

On 28 April 2023, Engelke died at the age of 61, from colon cancer.

== Discography ==
=== Studio albums ===
- Fair Warning (1992)
- Rainmaker (1995)
- Go! (1997)
- Four (2000)
- Brother's Keeper (2006)
- Aura (2009)
- Sundancer (2013)
- Pimp Your Past (2016)

=== Live albums ===
- Live in Japan (1993)
- Live at Home (1995)
- Live and More (1998)
- Talking Ain’t Enough – Fair Warning Live in Tokyo (3 CD, 2 DVD) (2010)
- Two Nights to Remember (2019)

=== Compilation albums ===
- Early Warnings 92–95 (1997)
- A Decade of Fair Warning (2001)
- Best and More (2012)

=== Extended plays ===
- In the Ghetto (1993)
- Burning Heart (1995)
- Angels of Heaven (1996)
- Save Me (1997)
- Heart on the Run (2000)
- Still I Believe (2000)
- Don't Keep Me Waiting (2006)

=== with Kee of Hearts ===
- Kee of Hearts (2017)
