= Voodoo Circle =

German hard rock band

- Also known as: Alex Beyrodt's Voodoo Circle
- Origin: Germany
- Genres: Hard rock, heavy metal
- Years active: 2008–present
- Label: AFM Records
- Members: David Readman; Alex Beyrodt; Alex Jansen; Markus Kullmann
- Past members: Mat Sinner; Jimmy Kresic; Alessandro Del Vecchio; Mel Gaynor; Tim Husung; Francesco Jovino; Herbie Langhans
- Website: voodoocircle.de

Voodoo Circle, also known as Alex Beyrodt's Voodoo Circle, is a German hard rock band founded in 2008, as a project of Silent Force guitarist Alex Beyrodt (guitarist for heavy metal band Primal Fear until his departure in 2024) who had the idea to re-think his personal vision of music, making songs more based on his early influences, such as Whitesnake, Yngwie Malmsteen, Deep Purple and Rainbow.

After the debut album called Alex Beyrodt's Voodoo Circle, the project became a collaborative band, composed mainly of Alex Beyrodt on guitar together with vocalist David Readman (Pink Cream 69) and bassist Mat Sinner (Beyrodt's bandmate on bands Primal Fear, Sinner and Silent Force) with the addition of a keyboard player and a drummer. On 5 May 2016, after doing 4 albums and tours, it was announced that original vocalist David Readman was leaving the band to focus on other activities. He was replaced by Herbie Langhans (Beyond the Bridge, ex-Sinbreed, ex-Seventh Avenue).

The band has gained some critical and commercial success with the 2011 album Broken Heart Syndrome. The last two Voodoo Circle albums with Readman on vocals are More Than One Way Home released in 2013 and Whisky Fingers released in 2015. The first album with Langhans on vocals is called Raised on Rock and was released on 9 February 2018, via AFM Records GmbH.

In October 2020, AFM Records announced vocalist David Readman and drummer Markus Kullmann return and the album Locked & Loaded which was released on 15 January 2021.

== Band members ==
=== Present ===
- Alex Beyrodt – guitar (2008–present)
- Alex Jansen – bass guitar (2024–present)
- David Readman – vocals (2008–2016, 2020–present)
- Markus Kullmann – drums (2009–2014, 2020–present)

=== Former ===
- Mat Sinner – bass/producer (2008–2016, 2017–2024)
- Mel Gaynor – drums (2008–2009)
- Jimmy Kresic – keyboards (2008–2013)
- Alessandro Del Vecchio – keyboards/vocals (2013–2017)
- Tim Husung – drums (2014–2015)
- Francesco Jovino – drums (2015–2019)
- Corvin Bahn – session keyboards (2017–2018)
- Herbie Langhans – vocals (2017–2019)

== Discography ==
=== Studio albums ===
- Voodoo Circle (2008)
- Broken Heart Syndrome (2011)
- More Than One Way Home (2013)
- Whisky Fingers (2015)
- Raised on Rock (2018)
- Locked & Loaded (2021)
- Hail to the King (2024)
