= Frontiers Music =

Italian record label

- Founded: 1996
- Founder: Serafino Perugino
- Distributors: The Orchard (US & Canada); Sony Music (Australia & New Zealand); Virgin Music (UK); PIAS (Spain/Portugal)
- Genre: Rock; classic rock nostalgia; hard rock; heavy metal; glam metal; AOR; progressive rock; power pop; progressive metal; symphonic metal; neo-classical metal; power metal; melodic rock; pop rock
- Country of origin: Italy
- Location: Naples
- Official website: www.frontiers.it

Frontiers Music (formerly Frontiers Records) is an Italian record label that primarily focuses on hard rock. The label was founded in 1996 by Serafino Perugino and is headquartered in Naples.

== History ==
In 1996, Serafino Perugino began his career in the music industry as an Italian distributor for various artists in the field of classic rock, earning a strong reputation in the industry. In 1998, this reputation enabled him to establish Frontiers Records, named after Journey's album Frontiers. The label's first release was the double live album Never Say Goodbye by the British hard rock band Ten.

Balancing working with new artists, Frontiers Records has become a label in the classic rock nostalgia circuit. Its roster includes several classic rock bands and artists, such as Toto, Journey, Whitesnake, Blue Öyster Cult, Styx, Survivor, Quiet Riot, Boston, FM, Glenn Hughes, Joe Lynn Turner, Jeff Scott Soto, Jeff Lynne, Yes, Little River Band, Winger, House of Lords, Thunder, Crush 40, and Hardline.

In December 2010, Frontiers Records finalized a sales contract with EMI Music for U.S. and Canada distribution, which took effect in January 2011. After Universal Music Group (UMG)'s acquisition of EMI, UMG subsidiary Caroline assumed U.S. distribution. Beginning in January 2017, Sony Music or its independent labels distributor RED Music began distributing Frontiers Records releases in key markets, including the U.S., Canada, Australia, and New Zealand. Caroline Distribution (now Virgin Music Label & Artist Services) continued handling distribution in the U.K., while independent labels managed distribution in other parts of the world. Exclusive distribution in Greece is handled by Infinity Entertainment IKE. The exact date Frontiers Records rebranded itself as Frontiers Music remains unclear, though speculation suggests it occurred in 2014.

Italian producer, singer, keyboardist, songwriter, and mixing engineer Alessandro Del Vecchio served as the label's in-house producer for thirteen years, until announcing his departure in March 2024.

=== BlkIIBlk Records ===
In October 2024, Frontiers created the metal music imprint BllkIIBlk Records, with Biohazard as their first signed artist. In March 2025, Megadeth signed with BlkIIBlk to release their seventeenth and final studio album, Megadeth (2026). By January 2026, the imprint's roster included Forbidden, Cro-Mags, Unto Others, and Nunslaughter.

== Artists ==
- 7 Months
- Arc Of Life
- About Us
- Action
- Airrace
- Alan Parsons
- Allen/Lande
- Ambition
- American Tears
- Ammunition
- Animal Drive
- Anette Olzon
- Asia
- Autograph
- Auras
- Avalon
- Bad Habit
- Bad Moon Rising
- Balance
- Bailey
- Beggars & Thieves
- Benedictum
- Beyond The Bridge
- The Big Deal
- Bigfoot
- Billy Sherwood
- Black 'n Blue
- Blackwood Creek
- Blanc Faces
- Blood Red Saints
- Blue Öyster Cult
- Bonrud
- Bowes & Morley
- Bob Catley
- Boston
- Bourgeois Pigs
- Brazen Abbot
- Brian Howe
- Bruce Kulick
- Burning Rain
- Cain's Offering
- Cassidy Paris
- Chez Kane
- Cinderella
- Circus Maximus
- The Codex
- Constancia
- Cosmo
- Crashdïet
- Crash The System
- Crazy Lixx
- Creye
- Crown of Thorns
- Crush 40
- Danger Danger
- Daniele Liverani
- Danny Vaughn
- Dario Mollo / Tony Martin
- Dark Lunacy
- David Readman
- Def Leppard (EU)
- The Defiants
- De La Cruz
- Dennis DeYoung
- Diamond Dawn
- Dokken
- Dream Child
- Dukes of the Orient
- Eclipse
- Edge of Paradise
- Emerald Rain
- Empty Tremor
- The End Machine
- Enemy Eyes
- Enuff Z'nuff
- Evil Masquerade
- Extreme
- Fair Warning
- False Memories
- First Signal
- FM
- Forty Deuce
- Frederiksen / Denander
- From the Inside (Danny Vaughn)
- Furyon
- Genius
- Gene The Werewolf
- Giant
- Girlschool
- Giuntini Project
- Glenn Hughes
- Great White
- Hardline
- Harem Scarem
- Hell In The Club
- Heaven's Edge
- Heavens Fire
- Hess
- Honeymoon Suite
- House of Lords
- Howard Leese
- Hurtsmile
- Icon Of Sin
- Iconic
- Impellitteri
- Infinite & Divine
- Inglorious
- Ignescent
- Issa
- Jack Blades
- Jack Russell's Great White
- Jaded Heart
- Jaime Kyle
- James Christian
- Jean Beauvoir
- Jeff Lynne
- Jeff Scott Soto (JSS)
- Jim Peterik
- Jimi Jamison
- Joe Lynn Turner
- John Elefante
- John Shadowinds
- John Waite
- John West
- John Wetton
- Jon Anderson
- Jorn
- Journey (EU)
- Keel
- Kee of Hearts
- Kelly Keagy
- Kent Hilli
- Khymera
- King Kobra
- Kingdom Come
- Kip Winger
- Kiske/Somerville
- KXM
- L.A. Guns
- Labyrinth
- Lana Lane
- Lenna Kuurmaa
- Level 10
- Lords of Black
- Leverage
- Lionsheart
- Little River Band
- Lords of Black
- Los Angeles
- Lou Gramm Band (EU)
- Lunatica
- Lynch Mob
- The Magnificent
- The Howlers (UK)
- Magnus Karlsson's Free Fall
- Mastedon
- Mecca
- Megadeth
- Meldrum
- Melodica
- Mercury X
- The Mercury Train
- Michael Kiske
- Michael Sembello
- Michael Thompson Band
- Mike Tramp
- Millenium
- Mind Key
- The Mob
- Mollo Martin
- Mr. Big
- The Murder of My Sweet
- Neal Morse
- Nelson
- Night Ranger
- Nordic Union
- Norway
- Novena
- Oliver Hartmann
- On the Rise
- One Desire
- Operation: Mindcrime
- Outloud
- Palace
- Pathosray
- Perfect Plan
- Phantom Elite
- Phantom V
- Philip Bardowell
- Pink Cream 69
- Place Vendome
- Places of Power
- Platens
- Player
- The Poodles
- Praying Mantis
- Pretty Maids
- Pride of Lions
- Primal Fear
- Prime Suspect
- Prime Time
- Q5
- RavenEye
- Rated X
- Resurrection Kings
- Revertigo
- Revolution Saints
- Richard Marx
- Richie Kotzen
- Rick Springfield
- Ring of Fire
- Rising Steel
- Robin Beck
- Royal Hunt
- Saint Deamon
- Scardust
- Scheepers
- Sebastian Bach
- Seventh Key
- Seventh Wonder
- Seven Spires
- Seven Tears
- Sculptor
- Shark Island
- She-Wolf
- Shooting Star
- Silent Rage
- Silent Force
- Skin Tag
- Slav Simanic
- Sonic Station
- Soul Doctor
- Soul SirkUS
- Spin Gallery
- Spread Eagle
- Stan Bush
- Starbreaker
- Steelheart
- Steve Lukather
- Strangeways
- Street Legal
- Stryper
- Styx
- Sweet & Lynch
- Sunstorm
- Survivor
- Tak Matsumoto Group
- Talisman
- Tall Stories
- Ted Nugent
- Ted Poley
- Temple Balls
- Ten
- Terra Nova
- Terry Brock
- Tesla
- The Dark Element
- Thunder
- Timo Tolkki
- TNT
- Tokyo Motor Fist
- Tommy Funderburk
- Tony Harnell & The Mercury Train
- Tony O'Hora
- Toto
- Touch
- Treat
- Triumph
- Trillium
- The Insues
- Trixter
- The Trophy
- Tyketto
- Two Fires
- Unruly Child
- Uriah Heep
- Valentine
- Vanden Plas
- VEGA
- Vertigo
- Vince Neil
- Vision Divine
- Vixen
- Voodoo Circle
- Voodoo Hill
- Warrant
- Wayward Sons
- W.E.T.
- Wetton/Downes
- White Lion
- White Skull
- Whitesnake
- Wig Wam
- Winger
- Work of Art
- World Trade
- X-Drive
- Xorigin
- Y&T
- Yes
- Yoso
- Zion
