= Keith St. John =

American singer-songwriter

- Born: Keith Edward St. John; April 1, 1969 (age 57)
- Origin: Brooklyn, New York, U.S.
- Genres: Rock; hard rock; heavy metal
- Occupations: Singer-songwriter, record producer, multi-instrumentalist
- Years active: 1989–present
- Labels: Frontiers Records; Warner Japan; Pony Canyon; Z Records
- Website: keithstjohn.com

Keith St. John (born April 1, 1969) is an American rock singer, songwriter, composer, producer and multi-instrumentalist. He is best known for his work as the frontman for the hard rock bands Montrose and Burning Rain.

Throughout his career, St. John has also toured as lead vocalist for notable hard rock acts such as: Kingdom Come, Lynch Mob, The Neal Schon Band, Tracii Guns’ L.A. Guns, Quiet Riot, Manny Charlton's Nazareth, and Sweet. He is credited with musical contributions to many television series including Entertainment Tonight, Law & Order, Step by Step, and Rescue Me. St John's music has been used in numerous films such as the 2010 Mark Wahlberg and Christian Bale film The Fighter, which features the Keith St. John song "Sweet Dreams."

== Biography ==
St. John's parents, both school teachers, recorded his first formal vocal performances at age two on cassette tapes. They decided to move to Long Island before he was enrolled in first grade. An only child, St. John grew up in an environment of classical music, folk music, jazz, and Broadway. He became a classically-trained tympanist and percussionist, and embarked on his first overseas tour at age 17. He eventually segued from performing in orchestras to playing clubs in heavy metal cover bands as a singing rock drummer. With a high-ranged, bluesy vocal sound, St. John decided to forgo the drums and become a rock frontman.

=== Early years ===
Early in his career, St. John recorded his first demo tape which ultimately led to him being signed to Atlantic Records. Atlantic head of A&R Jason Flom's new found band, Big Trouble, featured St. John as lead vocalist, drummer Bobby Rondinelli, guitarist Jon Levin, and bassist Tommy Henriksen.

Following Big Trouble, St. John was recruited by an independent management company that wanted to build a 'supergroup' in Los Angeles based on St. John's own music and creative vision. In the 1990s, Keith emerged on the Hollywood rock scene with his newly formed band St. John. While still tweaking the St. John sound and vision, Keith received an offer from rock bassist Rudy Sarzo to join Sarzo's band Sun King, which was already signed to Giant Records by Irving Azoff. The band featured Sarzo on bass and John 5 on guitar.

Throughout the late 1990s and 2000s, St. John was approached by many of Los Angeles' rock artists, managers, and record labels to sing and collaborate on up-and-coming projects. Many of these included former members of well-established L.A. bands such as: C.C. DeVille, James Kottak, Jeff Young, Chuck Wright, and Gregg D’Angelo. St John also co-wrote and recorded the album Immoral Fabric with the band Medicine Wheel which featured guitarist Marc Ferrari and drummer Ray Luzier.

=== Montrose (1998–2012) ===
Montrose was a hard rock band formed by legendary guitarist Ronnie Montrose in 1973. By 1998, Ronnie Montrose was recording his first solo guitar album. Following almost two decades of solo projects, making records with his band Gamma, and producing other bands, he was introduced to Keith St. John by their mutual friend and session keyboardist Ed Roth. St. John and Montrose immediately hit it off both personally and musically, and Montrose was inspired to reform his band. St. John helped Montrose recruit new members from the L.A. scene, and the first new lineup included drummer Pat Torpey and bassist Chuck Wright. Other members who toured and/or recorded with the band while St. John was a member included: drummers Eric Singer, "Wild" Mick Brown, and Jimmy DeGrasso, and bass players Ricky Phillips, Mick Mahan, David Ellefson, and Sean McNabb.

After they met in 1998, St. John and Montrose began writing together and recording home demos of new songs, some of which would make it into live Montrose shows when the band was on tour. Pat Torpey and Chuck Wright also participated in recording some studio demos of Ronnie and Keith's music. With some revisions to those early songs, and with some added new fresh material, in 2006 Montrose and St. John went into the studio to record a new record with Eric Singer on drums and Ricky Phillips on bass. The untitled recording has not been released. St. John enjoyed the longest tenure of any musician who worked with Montrose, about thirteen years.

Managed primarily by Scott Booray, the band toured mainly in the U.S. playing large outdoor festivals, arena shows, theaters, and clubs. Some touring highlights include performing at the Woodstock 40th Anniversary at Golden Gate Park in San Francisco where the opened their set with The Who's "My Generation," and being billed over the years with iconic arena bands such as Journey, Def Leppard, The Scorpions, Cheap Trick, Sammy Hagar, Lynyrd Skynyrd, Whitesnake, Dokken and many other rock legends.

Ronnie Montrose reportedly took his own life on March 3, 2012, after which St. John performed at a grand memorial concert in his honor at the Regency Ballroom in San Francisco. Other performers included: Sammy Hagar, Neal Schon, Steve Smith, Joe Satriani, Denny Carmassi, Eric Singer, and Tommy Thayer. Keith St. John and Doug Aldrich also performed a tribute to Montrose at the Iridium Theater in New York City on April 30, 2012, which was streamed over the World Wide Web and included the Les Paul Trio with Anton Fig. In 2015, St. John toured extensively in the U.S. with Tracii Guns and Rudy Sarzo playing their renditions of anthems from their prior bands. Every night their set included renditions of the Montrose hits "Rock Candy" and "Bad Motor Scooter" which were critically acclaimed in reviews of the show by rock journalists.

=== Burning Rain (1998–present) ===
In 1998, Keith met guitarist Doug Aldrich and the two demo'd their first few songs for the Japan-based record label Pony Canyon for what was to evolve into the band Burning Rain. St. John and Aldrich were introduced by bassist Ian Mayo, who was a member of St. John's Hollywood-based band, Crushed Flowers, and also a member of Aldrich's band Bad Moon Rising. Ian Mayo subsequently became the bassist for this new band, whose lineup was rounded out and completed by L.A.-based session drummer Alexx Makarovich.

Following their debut album entitled Burning Rain, St. John and Aldrich recorded two more studio albums under the name Burning Rain. The song "Cherie Don't Break My Heart" officially charted at #1 on a German rock radio station and in the top 10 on many other European radio stations during the year in which it was released. The band has toured Japan, Europe, and the U.S. and current members include bassist Sean McNabb, and drummer Matt Starr. Burning Rain is reportedly planning to release their fourth album Face The Music in early 2019.

== Discography ==
Keith St John:

St John Boogie Dancer - Jaded released 1991 label: 52nd Street territory: USA

Burning Rain:

- 1999 – Burning Rain (Pony Canyon / Z Records)
- 2000 – Pleasure to Burn (Pony Canyon / Z Records)
- 2013 – Epic Obsession (Frontiers Records / Warner Music Japan)
- 2019 – Face the Music (Frontiers Records)

== Lynch Mob / George Lynch (2010–2015) ==
In 2010 St John was asked to fill in for Lynch Mob frontman Oni Logan for some west coast tour dates that Logan could not attend. This stint led to an ongoing relationship with legendary guitarist George Lynch. Keith and George wrote and recorded songs for Lynch's 2011 solo album Kill All Control which received critical acclaim from Rock and Heavy Metal reviewers. Songs written by Lynch and St John for the album Kill All Control include "Kill All Control", "Fly On the Wall", "Resurrect Your Soul", "Rattlesnake", and "Man On Fire". St. John's most significant live performance with Lynch Mob came in 2014 before a packed house at the Saitama Super Arena in Tokyo Japan which holds approximately 36,000 people.

== Frontman for notable touring bands ==
Keith St John has been hired to tour as frontman for several other internationally well known rock bands including: The Neal Schon Band (2010), Sweet, Quiet Riot (2012), Nazareth (2013), Lynch Mob (2013–2014), L.A. Guns (aka "Gunzo"), Quiet Riot) (2015), Chicago Transit Authority, Howard Leese (2009–2010), and The Groove Remains the Same / Bonzo Bash (2010–2013). He also performs occasionally in the Las Vegas production show Raiding the Rock Vault at the Hard Rock Hotel & Casino.
