= Faya =

Faya can refer to:

- Faya (duo), a female R&B duo from West London
- Faya!, 2005 album by the reggae musician O-Shen
- Faya-Largeau, a city in Chad
- Myrica faya, a plant species
- "Fayaah Fayaah", a song by Guru Randhawa from Man of the Moon, 2022

== People ==
- Zhu Faya or Faya, Chinese Buddhist monk of the Jin dynasty
- Vybrant Faya, Ghanaian musician
- Alberto Faya, Cuban singer and musician
