= Carlos Villalobos (composer) =

American composer and musician

Carlos VillaLobos
- Born: Carlos VillaLobos, Jr. January 28, 1975 (age 51)
- Genres: Rock, alternative rock, industrial rock, pop, jazz, latin, electronica, classical, world,
- Occupations: Composer studio musician singer-songwriter audio engineer lyricist
- Instruments: Vocals, piano, synthesizer, keyboard, programming, guitar, bass guitar, saxophone, drums, violin, cello, oboe, harmonica
- Years active: Since 1998
- Labels: Alistar Records, Rhodium Records, Higher Octave
- Formerly of: Esperanza (La Esperanza), Angry Chiwawah

Carlos Jonathan VillaLobos, Jr. (born January 28, 1975) is an American composer and multi-instrumentalist musician, who writes and produces original music for rock and pop artists, and composes modern orchestral music for trailers, television shows and films.

== Career ==
=== Esperanza ===
Esperanza is VillaLobos's Latin-new age flamenco project, on which he performed all instruments, and engineered, recorded, produced, and mixed the albums, with guest guitarist Andre Barboza appearing on both La Esperanza and Esperanza II (2001), and bass player Rob Hagopian on the first release, La Esperanza.

The group released its self-titled debut LP on the Higher Octave label on September 22, 1998. JazzTimes described the album as "swirling, fleet flamenco guitar work meets modern dance rhythms [with] many rewarding layers to uncover". In 1999, the group appeared on the compilation album Chicago Rapid Transit: Grooves 99 with a remix track named "Spanish Eyes/Flamenc Tronic Mix".

The season finale of Sex and the City, "Ex and the City", which aired on October 3, 1999, featured four Esperanza songs: "La Punta", "El Loco", "Love & Lust", and "Cara Mia."

La Esperanza released Esperanza II on July 17, 2001, again on Higher Octave. On December 12, 2006, Esperanza released a holiday album entitled "Songs For The Season."

==== Albums ====
- La Esperanza (1998) (Higher Octave Music/Alistar Records)
- Esperanza II (2001) (Higher Octave Music/Alistar Records)
- Songs for the Season (2006) (Alistar Records)
- Valentine's Night (2011) (Alistar Records)
- Esperanza II (remastered) (2014) (Alistar Records)
- La Esperanza (2014) (Alistar Records)

==== Compilations ====
- Music for the New Millennium (Virgin)
- Nuevo Flamenco (Higher Octave/Virgin)
- Rendezvous: Echoes Within the City (Higher Octave/Virgin)
- Tabu: Mondo Flamenco (Narada)
- Gypsy Magic: Nouveau Flamenco (EMI)

=== Angry Chiwawah ===
Angry Chiwawah was Carlos VillaLobos's heavy rock project. The band released their album Unleashed on Rhodium Records on April 30, 2002. The cover art for the album features model/actress Brande Roderick.

The band's music appeared on The Real World: Las Vegas, The Real World: Paris and Real World/Road Rules Challenge: The Gauntlet. US Cellular preloaded the band's song "Please" onto the company's Motorola ROKR z6m phones.

=== Starting From Zero ===
In 2008, VillaLobos began production on a new rock project, Starting From Zero. VillaLobos tracked drums with producer/engineer Rae Dileo at Solid Sound Recording Studio in Hoffman Estates, Illinois. The rest of the project was recorded in VillaLobos' home studio, Villa de Lobos, and in 2010 the band changed its name to SuperLoaded.

=== Other projects ===
VillaLobos's first television music project was as the composer of original music for Baywatch Hawaii in 2000. He wrote and provided instrumentation for one song per episode using local vocalists, and wrote and performed the theme song "Let Me Be The One", with co-writers Glenn Medeiros and Fiji

VillaLobos engineered, produced and mixed O-Shen's debut album Iron Youth in 2000. He also co-wrote the music with O-Shen and performed all instruments on the album, for which he received his second Na Hoku Hanohano Awards nomination and his first win.

VillaLobos is featured on the 2001 album Liquifury by Hurricane. He co-wrote the track "Bleed For Me" with Kelly Hansen and Jay Schellen, and also played guitar on the recording.

VillaLobos contributed a remix track, "In Dreams (Chase The White Rabbit Into Pakistan)" to Filter's fourth album, Anthems for the Damned, released in November 2008.

VillaLobos worked with Terrence Howard on the song "What The DJ Spins" for the television show Empire, playing drums, bass and additional keyboards. He also worked on several other songs featured on the show, and as the ADR Supervisor in Chicago for the series. He collaborated with Empire co-writer and singer Ashley Ballard to form a side project called LA LA LA.

== Awards ==
In 1998, the Hawai'i Academy of Recording Arts gave a Hoku Award for Best Pop CD to VillaLobos for his work on "Jalen".

VillaLobos won a second Hoku Award for Best Reggae Album for his work on "O-shen" in 2000.

== Work ==
- Empire (2015 TV series) – Various songs in Season 1, 2
- Sex and the City – Esperanza (1999)
- Baywatch Hawaii – Soundtrack (2000–2001)
- The Real World – "Who Do You Think You're Foolin'" & "Please", "Suddenly" (2003)
- On the Record with Bob Costas – I will (2003)
- North Shore- "Island Warriors" & "Girl" (2005)
- 'Starting Over' -"Mistakes" (2005)
- Close to Home – "Who Do You Think You're Foolin'" (2006)
- Threshold – "Suddenly" (2006)
- CSI: NY – Hide (2006)
- Tourgasm – I Will (2006)
- The Challenge – Turns to Stone (2006)
- The Hills – Better Days (2006)
- Blade: The Series- Frio (2006)
- Paradise City – Better days (2007)
- Her Best Move – Let You Know & "Get Ready" (2009)
- Cane – Hide (2007)
- Brothers & Sisters- El Sur de La Vida (2007)
- Dexter – If We See the Day (2008)
- Wife Swap – "Check The Lock", "Make The Cut" (2008)
- Easy Money – "Meri Lewa" (2008)
- Crash – Please & "Who Do You Think You're Foolin'" (2008)
- The Two Mr. Kissels – "Never Surrender" (2008)
- How I Met Your Mother – "El Lago" & "Please" (2008)
- Doomed to Die- Heartbreaker (2008)
- Anthony Bourdain: No Reservations- Soundtrack (2008)
- Criminal Minds – Frio (2009)
- Truth Be Told – "Mesmerize Me" (2009)
- Moving up – "Come Like You Are" (2009)
- GameTrailers TV with Geoff Keighley' – "Marathon Man", "Mesmeric" (2009)
- Madman of the Sea – "If We See The Day" (2010)
- Telemurder – "Who Will Save You" (2010)
- Weird, True & Freaky- Soundtrack (2010)
- Composed- "Who Will Save You" (2010)
- "American Idol" – "Even In Youth" (2011)
- Face Off – Soundtrack (2011)
- Rehab Addict- "Even In Youth" (2014)

== See also ==
- New Flamenco
- Flamenco rumba
