= Face the Music (Burning Rain album) =

Studio album by Burning Rain
- Released: March 6, 2019
- Venue: United States
- Studio: Casa Dala Studios, Sherman Oaks, California
- Genre: Hard rock; heavy metal
- Length: 49:32 (International edition); 54:33 (Japanese edition)
- Label: Frontiers Records (International edition); Avalon (Japanese edition)
- Producer: Alessandro Del Vecchio

Burning Rain chronology
Epic Obsession (2013)	Face the Music (2019)

Singles from Face the Music
- 1. "Midnight Train" Released: January 10, 2019; 2. "If It's Love" Released: February 19, 2019; 3. "Face the Music" Released: March 15, 2019

Face the Music is the fourth album by hard rock and heavy metal supergroup Burning Rain with guitar player Doug Aldrich (Revolution Saints, The Dead Daisies), singer Keith St. John (ex-Montrose) featuring Brad Lang (ex-Y&T) on bass and Blas Elias (ex-Slaughter, Trans-Siberian Orchestra) on drums.

The album was produced by multi-instrumentalist Alessandro Del Vecchio for Italian label Frontiers Records and was released on March 6 in Japan and on March 22, 2019 in the internationally.

On January 10, 2019, "Midnight Train" was released as the first single from the album.

== Track listing ==
All songs written by Keith St. John and Doug Aldrich.

No.	Title	Length
1.	"Revolution"	3:15
2.	"Lorelei"	6:12
3.	"Nasty Hustle"	4:13
4.	"Midnight Train"	3:46
5.	"Shelter"	5:02
6.	"Face the Music"	3:36
7.	"Beautiful Road"	3:53
8.	"Hit and Run"	4:08
9.	"If It's Love"	6:23
10.	"Hideaway"	4:36
11.	"Since I'm Loving You"	4:28
Total length:		49:32

Japanese edition bonus track
No.	Title	Length
12.	"Shelter" (acoustic version)	5:01
Total length:		54:33

== Personnel ==
- Keith St. John – vocals, producing
- Doug Aldrich – guitar, producing
- Brad Lang – bass guitar, producing
- Blas Elias – drums, producing

=== Additional personnel ===
- Alessandro Del Vecchio – producing, mixing, mastering
- Maor Appelbaum - remastering
- Mark@ASYLUMseventy7 - artwork, layout
- Gerry Rosenblatt - legal
