= Hurricane (American band) =

American heavy metal band

- Origin: United States
- Genres: Hard rock; glam metal; heavy metal
- Years active: 1985–1991, 2001–2003, 2010–2012, 2014–present
- Labels: Enigma (previously), Capitol (1990—1991), Frontiers (2001—2003), Escape
- Members: Tony Cavazo; Mike Hansen; Dan Schumann; Carlos Cavazo
- Past members: Robert Sarzo; Michael Guy; John Ward; John Shearer; Doug Aldrich; Kelly Hansen; Jay Schellen; Sean Manning; Larry Antonino; Andrew Freeman; Jason Ames; Michael O'Mara; Chad Cancino
- Website: hurricaneofficialrockband.com

Hurricane is an American heavy metal band formed in 1985. The original line-up featured singer Kelly Hansen (pre-Unruly Child & Foreigner), guitarist Robert Sarzo (ex-Ozzy Osbourne), bassist Tony Cavazo (ex-SNOW) and drummer Jay Schellen (pre-Unruly Child & Yes). Tony and Robert are the brothers of Quiet Riot's Carlos Cavazo and Rudy Sarzo.

Hurricane released five albums: Take What You Want (1985), Over the Edge (1988), Slave to the Thrill (1990), Liquifury (2001) and Reconnected (2023). Over the Edge was their most successful album featuring their only charting song, "I'm on to You", which peaked at No. 33 on the Billboard Mainstream Rock Tracks chart in 1988.

== History ==
Quiet Riot's Kevin DuBrow introduced Robert Sarzo and Tony Cavazo in the early 1980s. After deciding to form a band, Sarzo and Cavazo recruited singer Kelly Hansen, drummer Jay Schellen and guitarist Michael Guy. With little label interest, the band decided to release an album themselves, Take What You Want. The album and constant touring led to them getting a major label deal.

=== Increasing popularity ===
In 1986 and 1987, they opened for Stryper on their To Hell with the Devil album tour. They were soon signed to Enigma Records, the same label as Stryper. They also opened for Gary Moore's 1987 US tour.

In March 1988, the band released their major label debut album, Over the Edge. Propelled by a powerful, yet melodic heavy metal sound, the album made No. 92 on the US albums chart and featured a cover of Alice Cooper's "I'm Eighteen," as well as the band's most successful single, the Jeff Jones-penned "I'm on to You." The title track, "Over the Edge", was also released as a single. They subsequently opened for Iron Maiden on three midwest dates of their Seventh Tour of a Seventh Tour.

In 1989, Sarzo left the group and was replaced by ex-Lion guitarist, Doug Aldrich. This lineup recorded the album Slave to the Thrill, which was released on 28 March 1990. While AllMusic described the record as the band's most "focused" album, it did not sell as well as its predecessor. The album's relative lack of success could be attributed to changing musical climates. Shortly after the release of this album, Aldrich moved on to Bad Moon Rising and the rest of the group disbanded.

=== Aftermath ===
In 1991, Schellen wrote, recorded and toured extensively with both Unruly Child and Sircle of Silence, while Hansen did a considerable amount of session work. Schellen suggested that Hansen help with the recording of Unruly Child's second release, and shortly after they agreed to resurrect Hurricane. English-born blues guitarist Sean Manning (former bandmate and Kevin Dubrow/Quiet Riot guitarist) and bassist Larry Antonino (bass) rounded out the new version of the band, who released Liquifury. Guitarists Carlos Villalobos and Randall Strom also appear as session musicians on this album, performing on one track apiece. Villalobos also co-wrote the track on which he performs. In the late 1990s, Schellen began a continuing collaboration with Billy Sherwood, encompassing World Trade, Conspiracy (with Chris Squire of Yes) and CIRCA:. Schellen joined the progressive rock band Asia in 2005. He is now a member of Yes.

Hansen joined Foreigner, and Aldrich is currently in the Las Vegas production Raiding The Rock Vault.

Manning went on to form The Exiles with three other English expatriates, original Bonham vocalist Paul Rafferty, bassist Paul Stanley, and drummer Terry Muscall. The band split up in the mid 1990s but a collection of demos, in part co-produced by Pat Benatar guitarist Neil Giraldo, surfaced in 1996 as Sean Manning & Paul Raffery's The Exiles (Indivision/SDM), with additional musical contributions by Giraldo, longtime Benatar drummer Myron Grombacher, Greg D'Angelo, and Richard Baker, among others.

In 2010, Robert Sarzo and Tony Cavazo, founding members, reunited and recruited singer Andrew Freeman and drummer Mike Hansen. They announced a tour and a CD in 2011.

In 2013, it was announced that Sarzo would be named the new lead guitarist of Geoff Tate's version of Queensrÿche.

Hurricane was the opening act on the 2014 tour with Tate's Queensrÿche. Sarzo played with both the opening and headlining acts on the entire tour. Singer Jason Ames handled lead vocal duties on the tour.

On July 21, 2023, the band announced their new album, Reconnected, which was released on August 25.

On October 27, 2023, longtime guitarist Robert Sarzo announced his departure from the group. Later in early November Carlos Cavazo was announced as his replacement.

In October 2023 it was announced that Hurricane would perform at Firefest Festival (10 Years After) to be held in the UK at Manchester Academy on 11th-13th October 2024. The band headlined on the Sunday night.

== Members ==
=== Current ===
Image	Name	Years active	Instruments	Release contributions
	Tony Cavazo	1985–1991; 2010–2012; 2014–present	bass guitar; backing vocals	all releases, except Liquifury (2001)
	Mike Hansen	2010–2012; 2014–present	drums	Reconnected (2023)
	Dan Schumann	2021–present	lead vocals	Reconnected (2023)
	Carlos Cavazo	2023—present	guitar; backing vocals	none

=== Former ===
Image	Name	Years active	Instruments	Release contributions
	Robert Sarzo	1985–1989; 2010–2023	guitars; backing vocals	all releases to date, except Liquifury (2001) and Slave to the Thrill (1990)
	Michael Guy	1985	guitar	none
	John “Wardie” Ward	1985	bass guitar; lead vocals	none
	John Shearer	1985	drums	none
	Kelly Hansen	1985–1991; 2000–2003	lead vocals; occasional guitar and keyboards	all releases, except Reconnected (2023)
	Jay Schellen	1985–1991; 2000–2003	drums; backing vocals (1985–1991)	all releases, except Reconnected (2023)
	Doug Aldrich	1989–1991	guitars; backing vocals	Slave to the Thrill (1990)
	Sean Manning	2001–2003	guitars	Liquifury (2001)
	Larry Antonino	2001–2003	bass guitar	Liquifury (2001)
	Andrew Freeman	2010–2012	lead vocals; occasional guitar	none
	Jason Ames	2014–2015	lead vocals	none
	Michael O'Mara	2016–2017	lead vocals	none
	Chad Cancino	2017–2021	lead vocals	none

== Discography ==
=== Studio albums ===
- Take What You Want (1985)
- Over the Edge (1988)
- Slave to the Thrill (1990)
- Liquifury (2001)
- Reconnected (2023)

=== Singles ===
- "Over the Edge" (1988)
- "I'm on to You" (1988)
- "Next to You" (1990)
- "Dance Little Sister" (1990)
