= Carlos Villalobos =

Carlos Villalobos may refer to:

- Carlos Villalobos (composer)
- Carlos Villalobos (politician)
