= Over the Edge (Hurricane album) =

Studio album by Hurricane
- Released: May 1988; May 25, 1988 (Japan)
- Recorded: March 1988
- Studios: Amigo, Los Angeles, CA
- Genres: Heavy metal; hard rock; glam metal
- Length: 45:46
- Label: Enigma
- Producer: Bob Ezrin

Hurricane chronology
Take What You Want (1985)	Over the Edge (1988)	Slave to the Thrill (1990)

Singles from Over the Edge
- 1. "Over the Edge" Released: 1988; 2. "I'm on to You" Released: 1988

Professional ratings
Review scores
Source	Rating
AllMusic	3/5 stars

Over the Edge is the second studio album by heavy metal band Hurricane, released in May 1988, through Enigma Records.

The album peaked at number 92 on the Billboard Top Pop Albums chart.

== Track listing ==
All of the following songs have been written by Hurricane, except where noted:

1. "Over the Edge" – 5:35
2. "I'm Eighteen" (Alice Cooper, Michael Bruce, Glen Buxton, Dennis Dunaway, Neal Smith) – 4:15
3. "I'm on to You" (Jeff Jones) – 3:56
4. "Messin' with a Hurricane" – 5:02
5. "Insane" – 3:48
6. "We Are Strong" – 4:41
7. "Spark in My Heart" – 4:56
8. "Give Me an Inch" – 4:17
9. "Shout" – 4:46
10. "Baby Snakes" – 4:30

"I'm Eighteen" is a cover of the Alice Cooper song of the same name from the 1971 Love It to Death album. That album was produced by Bob Ezrin, who also produced this album for Hurricane.

== Personnel ==
- Kelly Hansen – vocals
- Jay Schellen – drums, percussion, vocals
- Robert Sarzo – guitar, vocals
- Tony Cavazo – bass, vocals

+ On certain editions of the album, Kelly Hansen is credited as having performed additional guitar and keyboards as well. Furthermore, in the album's liner notes, where the band members' endorsements for their respective instruments are listed, "B.C. Rich Guitars" appears under Hansen's name.

Production

- Engineers – Mike Clink, Chris Steinmetz and Garth Richardson
