= Rascals in Paradise =

Rascals in Paradise may refer to:

- Rascals in Paradise (comics), a 1994 comic book by Jim Silke
- Rascals in Paradise (short story collection), a 1957 collection by James A. Michener and Arthur Grove Day

== See also ==
- Rascal in Paradise, a 2002 album by O-Shen
