= Slave to the Thrill =

Studio album by Hurricane
- Released: April 13, 1990
- Recorded: 1989
- Studios: One on One Recording Studios, Clear Lake Audio (North Hollywood, California)
- Genres: Hard rock; glam metal
- Length: 48:22
- Label: Enigma/Capitol
- Producer: Michael James Jackson

Hurricane chronology
Over the Edge (1988)	Slave to the Thrill (1990)	Liquifury (2001)

Singles from Slave to the Thrill
- 1. "Next to You" Released: 1990; 2. "Dance Little Sister" Released: 1990

Professional ratings
Review scores
Source	Rating
AllMusic	4.5/5 stars

Slave to the Thrill is the third studio album by American rock band Hurricane, released on April 13, 1990 through Enigma and on July 21, 1990, through Capitol.

== Background ==
The original album cover art was photographed by John Scarpati. It featured a nude female model lying on a machine. This cover was replaced shortly after the initial pressing by an alternative cover that had the female model removed from the picture so that all that was seen is the machine.

== Track listing ==
All songs written by Hurricane except where noted.

1. "Reign of Love" (Hurricane, Frank Simes) – 4:48
2. "Next to You" (Wendy Waldman, Brad Parker, Franne Golde) – 3:37
3. "Young Man" (Hurricane, Simes) – 3:53
4. "Dance Little Sister" – 4:52
5. "Don't Wanna Dream" (Hurricane, Waldman, Parker) – 5:06
6. "Temptation" (Hurricane, Jeff Jones) – 3:13
7. "10,000 Years" (Hurricane, Adam Mitchell, Robert Sarzo) – 5:45
8. "FX" (Instrumental) – 1:06
9. "In the Fire" – 3:29
10. "Let It Slide" (Hurricane, Waldman, Parker) – 4:37
11. "Lock Me Up" – 3:42
12. "Smiles Like a Child" (Waldman, Parker, Golde) – 4:14
- Track 8: "FX" is unlisted on physical versions of the album; it is listed as "Interlude" on digital streaming versions.

== Credits ==
Hurricane

- Kelly Hansen — vocals
- Jay Schellen — drums, percussion and vocals
- Doug Aldrich — guitars and vocals
- Tony Cavazo — bass guitar and vocals

Production

- Michael James Jackson — producer
- Chris Minto, Brian Levi — engineers
- Mike Tacci, Jeff Frickman — engineers assistant
- Chris Lord-Alge — mixing
