= Burning Rain =

American rock band

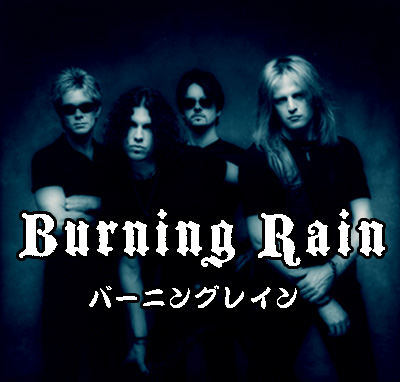

Background information
- Origin: Los Angeles, California
- Genres: Hard rock, heavy metal
- Years active: 1998–2001, 2013–2014, 2018-present
- Labels: Frontiers Records
- Members: Doug Aldrich; Keith St. John; Brad Lang; Blas Elias
- Past members: Ian Mayo; Alex Makarovich; Sean McNabb; Matt Starr
- Website: www.burningrain.net

Burning Rain is a band formed by guitarist Doug Aldrich (Revolution Saints, The Dead Daisies, ex-Dio, ex-Whitesnake) and singer Keith St. John (Montrose) in 1998. Joining the group were drummer Alex Makarovich (ex-Steelheart) and Ian Mayo (ex-Hericane Alice) on bass.

The band released two albums in Japan and Europe, Burning Rain (1999) and Pleasure to Burn (2000), respectively, before going on hiatus due to Aldrich's involvement with both Dio and Whitesnake. Keith St. John's joined Montrose during this time. Aldrich and St. John re-activated the group with a new rhythm section, veteran bassist Sean McNabb (Dokken) and drummer Matt Starr (Ace Frehley), and issued a new album, Epic Obsession, in 2013. Lately the band was on hiatus because of Aldrich's new band Revolution Saints and with him joining Dead Daisies.

In 2018 the band was reunited with Slaughter drummer Blas Elias and bassist Brad Lang (Y&T) and the new album Face The Music was released in 2019. A blues driven hard rock record, the album reaches back to the sound of the classic 70s hard rock.

== Band ==
=== Members ===
- Doug Aldrich – guitars (1998–2001, 2013–2014, 2018-present)
- Keith St. John – vocals (1998–2001, 2013–2014, 2018-present)
- Brad Lang – bass (2018-present)
- Blas Elias – drums (2018-present)

=== Past members ===
==== Bass ====
- Ian Mayo (1999–2001)
- Sean McNabb (2013–2014)

==== Drums ====
- Alex Makarovich (1999–2001)
- Matt Starr (2013–2014)

== Discography ==
- 1999 – Burning Rain (Pony Canyon / Z Records)
- 2000 – Pleasure to Burn (Pony Canyon / Z Records)
- 2013 – Epic Obsession (Frontiers Records / Warner Music Japan)
- 2019 – Face the Music (Frontiers Records)
