= Faithsedge =

American heavy metal band

- Origin: United States
- Genre: Christian metal
- Years active: 2009–present
- Members: Giancarlo Floridia; Fabrizio Grossi; Tim Gaines; Matt Starr
- Past members: Alex De Rosso; Tony Morra

Faithsedge is an American Christian metal band formed in 2009 by vocalist Giancarlo Floridia, bassist Fabrizio Grossi, guitarist Alex De Rosso, and drummer Tony Morra. The latter two were replaced by Tim Gaines and Matt Starr, respectively. As of 2026, they released four studio albums, on Scarlet Records.

== Band members ==
Current

- Giancarlo Floridia – vocals, guitar
- Fabrizio Grossi – bass
- Tim Gaines – lead guitar
- Matt Starr – drums

Past

- Alex De Rosso – lead guitar
- Tony Morra – drums

== Discography ==
- Faithsedge (2011)
- The Answer of Insanity (2014)
- Restoration (2016)
- Bleed for Passion (2019)
