= Burning Rain (album) =

Studio album by Burning Rain
- Released: March 3, 1999
- Studio: Track Record, North Hollywood, California, US; Psychosonic Sound, Sherman Oaks, California, US; Valley Center Studios, Van Nuys, Los Angeles, California, US
- Genre: Hard rock
- Length: 48:30 (Standard edition); 56:04 (2013 re-issue)
- Label: Pony Canyon (Standard edition); Canyon International (Japanese edition); Frontiers Records (2013 re-issue)
- Producer: Doug Aldrich

Burning Rain chronology
Burning Rain (1999)	Pleasure to Burn (2000)

Burning Rain is the debut studio album by the hard rock band Burning Rain. It was released in 1999 on Pony Canyon.

== Track listing ==
All songs written by Doug Aldrich and Keith St. John.

No.	Title	Length
1.	"Smooth Locomotion"	2:58
2.	"Superstar Train"	4:02
3.	"Jungle Queen"	4:05
4.	"Making My Heart Beat"	5:34
5.	"Feel No More"	3:48
6.	"Cheery Grove"	4:01
7.	"Can't Cut the Fire"	3:30
8.	"Can't Turn Your Back on Love"	4:25
9.	"Heaven's Garden"	4:36
10.	"Tokyo Rising"	3:33
11.	"Seasons of Autumn"	3:33
Total length:		48:30

2013 re-issue bonus tracks
No.	Title	Length
12.	"Smooth Locomotion" (acoustic version)	3:35
13.	"Can't Turn Your Back on Love" (acoustic version)	3:59

== Personnel ==
- Keith St. John – vocals
- Doug Aldrich – guitars, producing, engineering
- Ian Mayo – bass guitar
- Alex Makarovich – drums

== Production ==
- Michael Scott - recording, engineering
- David Hecht - engineering
- Jimmy Church - engineering
- David Hecht - engineering
- Jimmy Church - engineering
- Darrell Thorp - assistant engineering
- Noel Golden - mixing
- Scott Guttierez - assistant engineering, mixing
- Dave Donnelly - mastering
