= Epic Obsession =

Studio album by Burning Rain
- Released: March 17, 2013 (standard and digipack edition); April 24, 2013 (Japanese edition)
- Studio: Casa Dala Studio and Starmakers Studio, Woodland Hills, California
- Genre: Hard rock; heavy metal
- Length: 59:22 (standard edition); 71:44 (digipack edition); 72:18 (Japanese edition)
- Label: Frontiers (standard and digipack edition); Warner Music Japan (Japanese edition)
- Producer: Doug Aldrich; Keith St. John

Burning Rain chronology
Pleasure to Burn (2000)	Epic Obsession (2013)	Face the Music (2019)

Singles from Epic Obsession
- 1. "My Lust You Fate" Released: April 4, 2013

Epic Obsession is the third album of the hard rock and metal band Burning Rain featuring guitar player Doug Aldrich (Revolution Saints, The Dead Daisies) and vocalist Keith St. John. They produced the album that was released on March 17, 2013. The line-up is completed by Sean McNabb (Lynch Mob, Resurrection Kings) on bass and Matt Starr (Mr. Big) on drums.

== Track listing ==
All songs written by Doug Aldrich and Keith St. John except where noted.

No.	Title	Length
1.	"Sweet Little Baby Thing"	3:49
2.	"The Cure"	4:18
3.	"'Till You Die"	3:58
4.	"Heaven Gets Me By"	4:47
5.	"Pray Out Loud"	4:22
6.	"Our Time is Gonna Come"	5:24
7.	"Too Hard to Break"	5:38
8.	"My Lust Your Fate"	5:11
9.	"Made for Your Heart"	6:33
10.	"Ride the Monkey"	4:12
11.	"Out in the Cold Again"	5:42
12.	"When Can I Believe in Love"	5:32
Total length:		59:22

Digipack edition bonus tracks
No.	Title	Writer(s)	Length
13.	"Kashmir" (originally performed by Led Zeppelin)	John Bonham, Jimmy Page, Robert Plant	7:32
14.	"Heaven Gets Me By" (acoustic version)		4:46

Japanese edition Bonus tracks
No.	Title	Length
13.	"Fell Outta Love" (demo-unreleased track)	2:41
14.	"Made for Your Heart" (Candlelight version)	6:01
15.	"When Can I Believe in Love" (acoustic version)	4:14

Japanese special limited edition DVD
No.	Title	Length
1.	"Making - Behind the Scenes"
2.	"Bonus scenes"

== Personnel ==
- Keith St. John - vocals, piano
- Doug Aldrich - guitars
- Sean McNabb - bass guitar, backing vocals
- Matt Starr - drums

=== Additional personnel ===
- Brian Tichy - drums
- Jimmy D'Anda - drums
- David Donnelly - mastering
