= Matt Starr =

American drummer

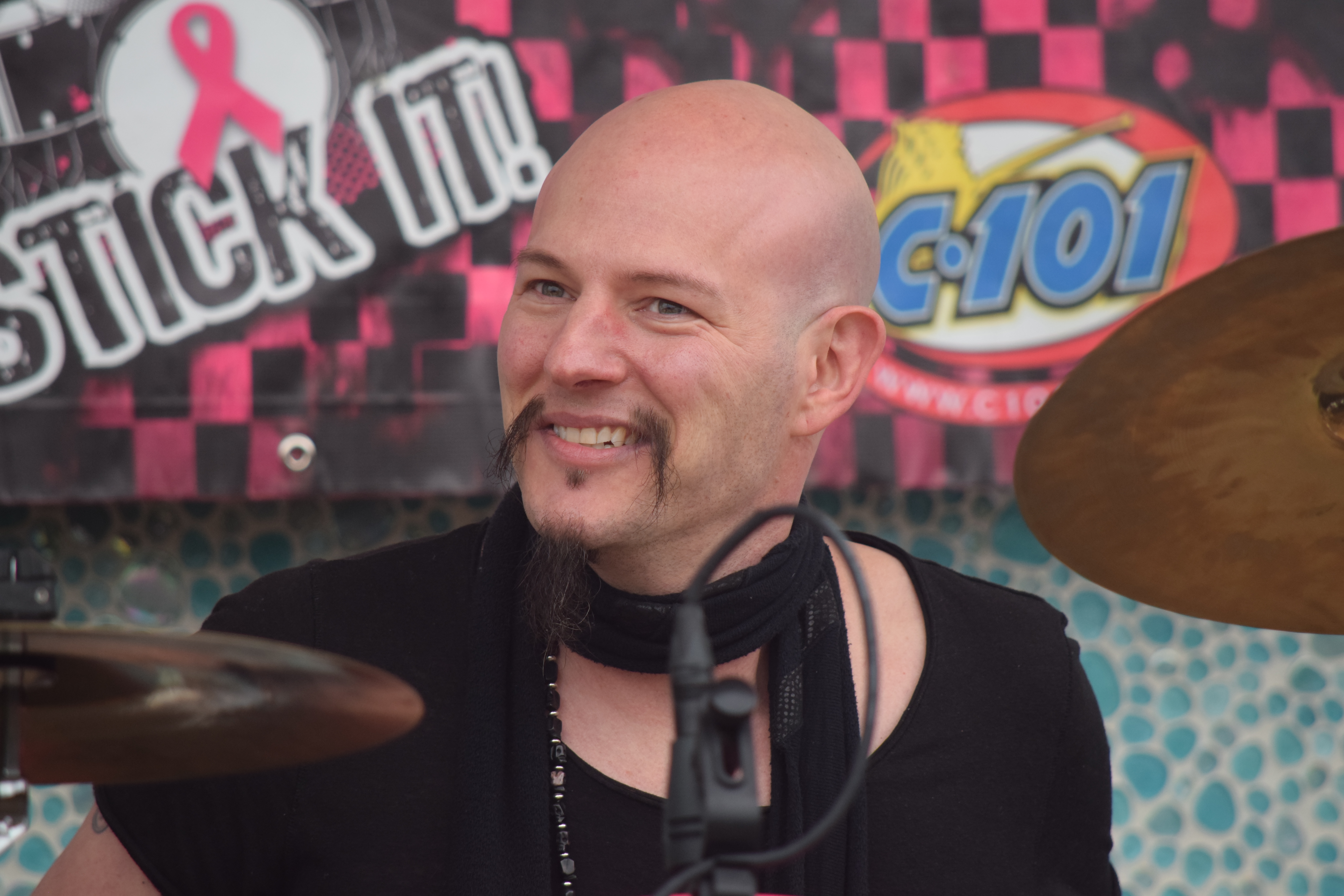
- Starr performing in 2015

Background information
- Origin: New York City, U.S.
- Genres: Rock
- Occupation: Musician
- Instruments: Drums; vocals
- Labels: Spitfire; Eagle Rock
- Member of: Faithsedge
- Formerly of: Burning Rain
- Website: mattstarrmusic.com

Matt Starr is an American drummer. He has performed with numerous artists and bands throughout his career, including Ace Frehley, Joe Lynn Turner, Love/Hate, Kevin DuBrow, Mr. Big, and Faithsedge.

== Career ==
In 2005, Starr co-wrote and recorded the Beautiful Creatures sophomore release, Deuce, and toured with the band the same year. The song "Freedom" was used in the 2009 Sandra Bullock film The Proposal. "Anyone", also from Deuce, was used in the FX series Sons of Anarchy. In late 2004, Starr formed the band Hookers & Blow with Guns N' Roses keyboardist Dizzy Reed and Quiet Riot guitarist Alex Grossi. They toured the U.S. in 2004.

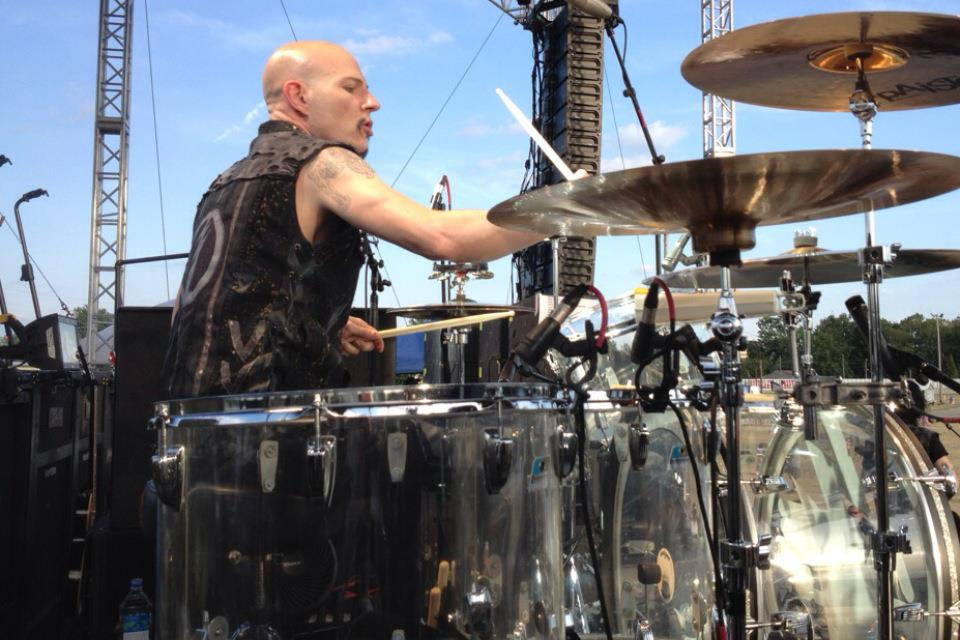
Starr performing in Detroit in 2012 with KISS guitarist Ace Frehley

In 2007, Starr stepped away from drumming and formed the Automatic Music Explosion as a singer and spent the next two years recording with producer Mike Chapman. The two met after Starr showed up at the producer's home and asked him to work on the record. Due to a lack of label support, the record never saw a proper release; however, several of the tracks were licensed to various cable television shows and movies, including SpongeBob SquarePants.

In 2012, Starr, together with Guns N' Roses guitarist Gilby Clarke, co-produced The Return to Psycho California, the debut release by the hard rock band Hotel Diablo. The same year, Starr joined former Kiss guitarist Ace Frehley's band. He also played drums on Frehley's 2014 release, Space Invader, as well as featuring on several tracks from Frehley's subsequent releases, Origins, Vol. 1; Spaceman; and Origins Vol. 2. While remaining with Frehley, in 2013, Starr began playing with Burning Rain, a band formed by Whitesnake guitarist Doug Aldrich, Montrose vocalist Keith St John, and Dokken bassist Sean McNabb. He performed on their 2013 album, Epic Obsession.

In 2014, Starr began filling in for Mr. Big drummer Pat Torpey, who was diagnosed with Parkinson's disease. He sat in on the band's ...The Stories We Could Tell world tour and played on several tracks from their 2017 album, Defying Gravity. He went on to tour with the band once more as they promoted their next release. Starr is also a member of the Christian metal band Faithsedge.
