= Digital Pinball: Last Gladiators =

1995 video game

- North American cover art
- Developers: KAZe; BeXide (iOS)
- Publishers: JP: KAZe; NA: Time Warner Interactive; EU: Sega; WW: BeXide
- Director: Norio Nakagata
- Producers: Jason Elias; Joann Perritano
- Designer: Takashi Kobayashi
- Programmer: Kunihito Hiramatsu
- Artists: Akiko Nakamura; Bryan A. Golden; Hiromi Seino
- Writer: Mina Handa
- Composers: Naoto Shibata; Yusuke Takahama; Doug Aldrich
- Platforms: Sega Saturn, iOS
- Release: Sega Saturn: JP: June 23, 1995; EU: September 1995; NA: November 1995; JP: September 11, 1997 (Ver9.7); iOS: WW: April 22, 2010
- Genre: Pinball
- Mode: Single-player

Digital Pinball: Last Gladiators (Note: Dejitaru Pinbōru Saigo No Ken Tōshi (Japanese: デジタルピンボール ラストグラディエーターズ). Also known simply as Digital Pinball in Europe and as Last Gladiators: Digital Pinball in North America) is a pinball video game developed and published by KAZe for the Sega Saturn. A successor, Digital Pinball: Necronomicon, was released in 1996 for the Saturn exclusively in Japan. An updated version, Digital Pinball: Last Gladiators Ver.9.7, was released in 1997 for the Saturn in Japan. Last Gladiators was ported to iOS in April 2010 as Last Gladiators Ver.2010.

== Gameplay ==
Digital Pinball: Last Gladiators has four pinball tables, each with its own themes; Gladiators, Knight of the Roses, Dragon Showdown and Warlock. Points are earned by hitting various targets, lanes, ramps and bumpers in the playfield. Before launching a ball, players have the option to choose between three bonus options of varying nature, e.g. starting the currently lit bonus round, super kickback, activating the extra ball and/or a random bonus target, 2x playfield, super jets, activating the deathwatch (out hole) bonus and various point bonuses. In addition to multiball rounds, each table has nine special bonus rounds culminating into an "Ultimate Round" when all bonus rounds have been completed (”Gladiator Show" for Gladiators, "Necromancer" for Knight of the Roses, "Banzai Showdown" for Dragon Showdown and "Last Judgment" for Warlock). The game ends when the player loses three balls in succession and/or any extra balls earned. The player's high scores for each table are then displayed in the "Last Gladiators Hall of Fame".

== Development and release ==
Digital Pinball: Last Gladiators was developed by Japanese corporation KAZe. The game's lead designer was Takashi Kobayashi. Director Norio Nakagata counted himself among the "pinball generation" and, wanting to successfully bring the genre to home consoles, spearheaded development on the Super Pinball series for the Super Nintendo Entertainment System. Still unsatisfied, the team felt bringing a game to a 32-bit console would finally be worthy of the moniker "digital pinball". According to a designer message hidden within the game, development took 11 months with about 70,000 lines of code written. As it was being built on new hardware, a trial-and-error methodology separate from the Super Pinball series was adopted and a significant amount of time was spent debugging it.

During development the game had working titles including The Pinball (Note: Za Pinbōru (Japanese: ザ・ピンボール)) and Pinball Arena (Note: Pinbōru Arīna (Japanese: ピンボール アリーナ)). Since the design team had an international release in mind, the visuals and music were created in North America to better appeal to Western markets. This included filming live-action footage in Hollywood. KAZe self-published the game on the Sega Saturn in Japan on June 23, 1995. According to company president Junichiro Kawasoe, an IBM PC compatible version was planned for release the following winter but it never materialized. It was published for the Saturn in Europe by Sega in September 1995 simply as Digital Pinball and in North America by Time Warner Interactive in November 1995 as Last Gladiators: Digital Pinball.

An update titled Last Gladiators: Digital Pinball Ver.9.7 was released in Japan on September 11, 1997. It featured some improved graphics and subtle refinements to the gameplay aimed at making it fairer and more satisfying for players. Kawasoe stated that this was done by carefully revisiting player feedback and internal testing results because KAZe viewed pinball as a genre that could be fine-tuned and evolved over time. Registered players of the original release of the game were able to purchase Ver.9.7 at a discounted price. An iOS version titled Last Gladiators Ver.2010 was developed by BeXide and began distribution starting on April 22, 2010. Based on Ver.9.7, this iteration added touch controls but only included the Gladiators table upon initial purchase; the remaining three tables had to be bought separately.

== Reception ==
Reception

Review scores
Publication	Score
Hyper	70% (Saturn)
Mean Machines Sega	67% (Saturn)
Next Generation	4/5 (Saturn)
TouchArcade	4/5 (iOS)

Next Generation reviewed the Saturn version of the game, rating it four stars out of five, and praised Last Gladiators' "excellent programming" and 'convincing faithfulness' to a real pinball machine, further praising the game's bonuses and skill shots. Next Generation expressed that Last Gladiators is 'more accurate' than other virtual pinball games, and summarized the game as "a great deal of fun".

GamePro reviewed the Saturn version of Last Gladiators, criticizing it as "unimaginative" but 'fine', praising its sound effects and "slick" animations, and concluded by recommending the game to "hard-core" pinball fans. Mean Machines Sega gave the Saturn version of Digital Pinball an overall score of 67%, calling the game "beautifully presented", praising its "crisp" graphics and "stylish" UI, as well as its "crystal clear" sound effects. Mean Machines further calls Digital Pinball "a remarkably close interpretation of real pinball", but criticized its table design; while praising the themed visuals of each table, Mean Machines calls them "cramped" and "uninspiring", summarizing the only goal of the game as 'gaining points', and criticized the lack of bonus effects as the player gains points.

A reviewer for Hyper was confused by the change in name from Last Gladiators to Digital Pinball for the Australian release and found most tables to be interesting, but criticized the graphics as gaudy and second-rate with messages appearing on the middle of the screen instead of using callouts. The sound and speech in the game were found to be excellent.
