= Pleasure to Burn (Burning Rain album) =

Studio album by Burning Rain
- Released: September 20, 2000
- Genre: Hard rock
- Length: 50:17 (Standard edition); 59:12 (2013 re-issue)
- Label: Pony Canyon (International edition); Z Records (UK edition); CD-Maximum (Russian edition); Canyon International (Japanese edition); Frontiers Records (2013 international re-issue); Icarus Music (2013 Argentinian re-issue)
- Producer: Doug Aldrich

Burning Rain chronology
Burning Rain (1999)	Pleasure to Burn (2000)	Epic Obsession (2013)

Pleasure to Burn is the second studio album by hard rock band Burning Rain. It was released in 2000 on Pony Canyon. It is the last album with Ian Mayo on bass guitar and Alex Makarovich on drums. The band was on hiatus after touring.

== Track listing ==
All songs written by Doug Aldrich and Keith St. John.

No.	Title	Length
1.	"Fireball"	4:04
2.	"Love Emotion"	3:36
3.	"Stone Cold n' Crazy"	5:22
4.	"Cherie Don't Break My Heart"	5:17
5.	"Shot Down"	3:37
6.	"Love de jour"	3:57
7.	"Faithfully Yours"	5:47
8.	"Sex Machine"	4:21
9.	"Metal Superman"	3:47
10.	"Judgement Day"	5:48
11.	"Devil Money"	4:47
Total length:		50:17

2023 reissue edition bonus tracks
No.	Title	Length
12.	"Live for That Rush" (demo version)	3:16
13.	"Cherie Don't Break My Heart" (acoustic version)	5:49

== Personnel ==
- Keith St. John – vocals
- Doug Aldrich – guitars, producing
- Ian Mayo – bass guitar
- Alex Makarovich – drums

=== Additional personnel ===
- Edward Roth – keyboards
- Jimmy Church - engineering
- Yukiko Tanaka - engineering
- Jeff Glixman - mixing
- Will Sandalls - mixing
- Dave Donnelly - mastering
