= Doug Aldrich =

American guitarist (born 1963)

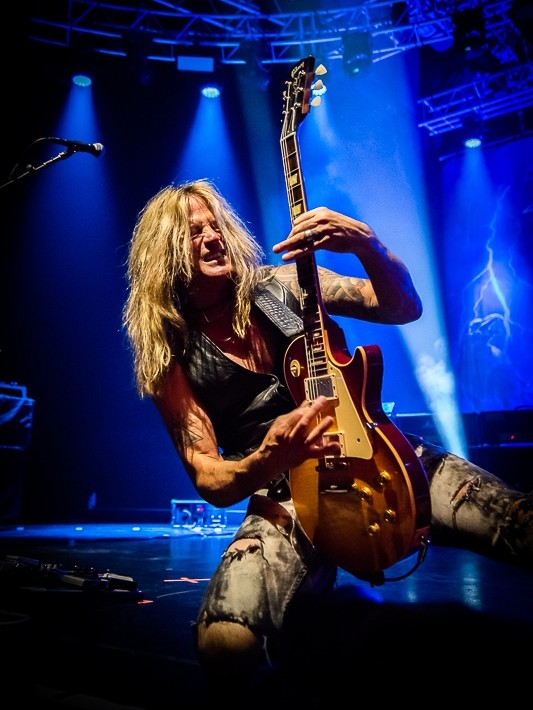
- Aldrich performing in 2022

Background information
- Born: February 19, 1963 (age 63); Raleigh, North Carolina, U.S.
- Genres: Hard rock; heavy metal
- Occupation: Guitarist
- Years active: 1982–present
- Labels: Geffen; SPV; Frontiers; Spitfire; Eagle; Enigma; Z
- Member of: Burning Rain; The Dead Daisies
- Formerly of: Whitesnake; Dio; Hurricane; Lion; Revolution Saints; House of Lords; Bad Moon Rising
- Website: dougaldrich.burningrain.net

Doug Aldrich (born February 19, 1963) is an American hard rock guitarist. He founded the band Burning Rain with Keith St. John in 1998 and has played with Whitesnake, Dio, Lion, Hurricane, House of Lords, Bad Moon Rising and Revolution Saints. He has also released several solo albums. Doug toured with former Deep Purple bassist and vocalist Glenn Hughes' band in 2015. It was announced in early 2016 that he would be replacing Richard Fortus as guitarist of The Dead Daisies.

== Biography ==
Aldrich began playing guitar at age 11, inspired by his older sister's Jeff Beck albums. Aldrich's first guitar was a cheap Les Paul-copy purchased from a Sears catalog. Fresh out of high school, Aldrich met the girlfriend of Kiss drummer Eric Carr, who told him that he was the type of guitarist Kiss was looking for to replace Ace Frehley. He subsequently auditioned for Kiss in 1982 but the spot ultimately went to Vinnie Vincent. Aldrich said that although the members of Kiss treated him very well during the audition process, Gene Simmons told him to "lose this number" when Aldrich attempted to talk with him again months later.

Aldrich joined the L.A. glam band Lion in 1983, recording two albums and one EP before the band broke up in 1989.

When Aldrich was in Lion recording their first album at Scotti Brothers' Recording Studio, he was invited to join the Slaughter, but turned down the invite since the Lion project was just taking off. Nevertheless, Aldrich did play some guitar for Slaughter during those early days.

Aldrich was briefly a member of Hurricane, replacing founding guitarist Robert Sarzo in 1989. He participated in the writing and recording of Slave to the Thrill (1990) before leaving the band.

In early 2014, Aldrich joined the critically acclaimed production show Raiding the Rock Vault at the Tropicana Las Vegas, where he performed six shows a week with other rock 'n' roll artists including Robin McAuley (formerly Survivor, MSG), John Payne (Asia), Howard Leese (Bad Company, Heart), Paul Shortino (Quiet Riot) and Andrew Freeman (The Offspring, Last in Line), among others. As of late 2015, this collaboration was still on ongoing project.

During 2015, Aldrich joined the Glenn Hughes solo European tour as guitarist, along with drummer Pontus Engborg, to complete the power trio with Hughes on bass and vocals.

In late January 2016, it was announced that Aldrich was replacing Richard Fortus as guitarist in The Dead Daisies, as Fortus would be participating in the Guns N' Roses reunion. As of late January 2016 Aldrich was in Nashville with The Dead Daisies, working on a follow-up album to Revolución (2015). Aldrich joined bassist Marco Mendoza in the band; the two previously performed together in Whitesnake. In November 2016, The Dead Daisies performed on the Kiss Kruise VI event.

== Equipment ==
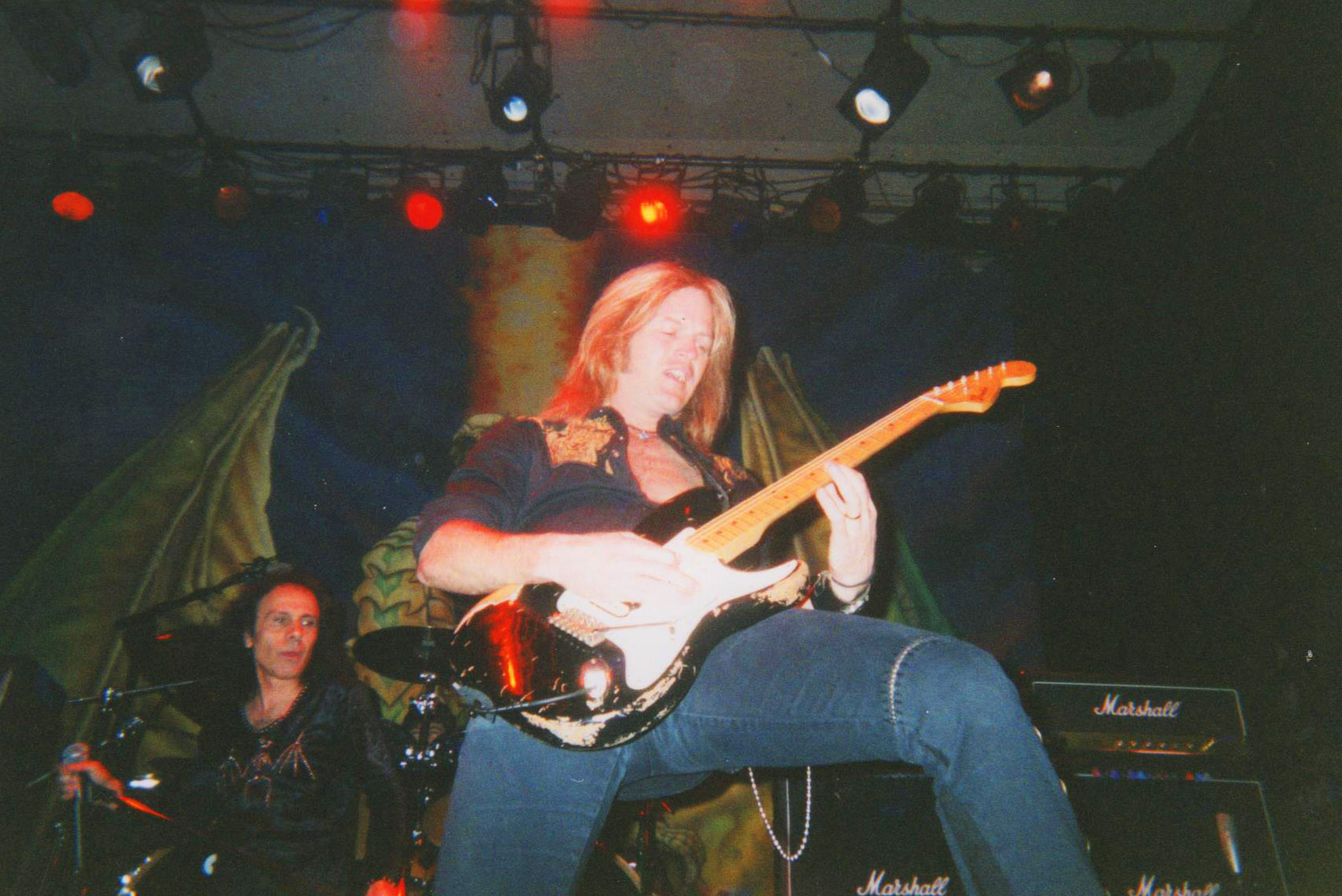
Aldrich performing with Dio in 2002

Aldrich was previously endorsed by Jackson Guitars. He used their Dinky and Soloist Superstrats as well as his own signature model which has bridge and neck position humbucking pickups were "Full-shred" pickups which Seymour Duncan specially wired. California-based Suhr Guitars currently offers Aldrich signature humbucking pickups.

He plays various Gibson Les Pauls, Fender Stratocasters through Suhr/ Cameron hot-rodded Marshall JMPs and Vintage Modern amps. In 2016, Aldrich became an official endorsee of ESP Guitars.

Aldrich sums up his philosophy of playing this way: "I'm not one of those guys that follows whatever is trendy. I'd rather do what I do best and do it to the best of my ability."

== Discography ==
| Year | Artist | Album | Notes |
|---|---|---|---|
| 1983 | Mansfield | Gonna Rock You b/w Overdrive | EP |
| 1990 | House of Lords | Sahara | Guest Guitar |
| 1990 | Hurricane | Slave to the Thrill | |

== Lion ==
| Year | Artist | Album | Notes |
|---|---|---|---|
| 1986 | Lion | Power Love | EP |
| 1987 | Lion | Dangerous Attraction | including "The Transformers (Theme)" |
| 1989 | Lion | Trouble in Angel City | |

== Bad Moon Rising ==
| Year | Artist | Album | Notes |
|---|---|---|---|
| 1991 | Bad Moon Rising | Full Moon Fever | EP |
| 1991 | Bad Moon Rising | Bad Moon Rising | |
| 1993 | Bad Moon Rising | Blood on the Streets | EP |
| 1993 | Bad Moon Rising | Blood | |
| 1995 | Bad Moon Rising | Junkyard Haze | EP |
| 1995 | Bad Moon Rising | Opium for the Masses (different title: Free) | |
| 1995 | Bad Moon Rising | Millwall Brick | Promo EP |
| 1995 | Bad Moon Rising | Junkyard Haze | EP |
| 1999 | Bad Moon Rising | Flames on the Moon | Compilation |
| 2005 | Bad Moon Rising | Full Moon Collection | Box-set |

== Solo Albums ==
| Year | Artist | Album | Notes |
|---|---|---|---|
| 1994 | Doug Aldrich | Highcentered | |
| 1997 | Doug Aldrich | Electrovision | |
| 1997 | Doug Aldrich | The Electro-Lesson | Guitar Instructional Video |
| 2001 | Doug Aldrich | Alter Ego | Compilation |

== Burning Rain ==
| Year | Artist | Album | Notes |
|---|---|---|---|
| 1999 | Burning Rain | Burning Rain | |
| 2000 | Burning Rain | Pleasure to Burn | |
| 2013 | Burning Rain | Epic Obsession | |
| 2019 | Burning Rain | Face the Music | |

== Dio ==
| Year | Artist | Album | Notes |
|---|---|---|---|
| 2002 | Dio | Killing the Dragon | |
| 2003 | Dio | Evil or Divine – Live in New York City | Recorded in 2002, DVD |
| 2006 | Dio | Holy Diver – Live | |
| 2010 | Dio | Electra | Single |

== Whitesnake ==
| Year | Artist | Album | Notes |
|---|---|---|---|
| 2006 | Whitesnake | Live... In the Still of the Night | Filmed and recorded in 2004, released in 2006 (CD & DVD) |
| 2006 | Whitesnake | Live: In the Shadow of the Blues | |
| 2006 | Whitesnake | Gold | Compilation |
| 2008 | Whitesnake | Good to Be Bad | |
| 2011 | Whitesnake | Forevermore | |
| 2013 | Whitesnake | Made in Japan | CD/DVD, Live |
| 2013 | Whitesnake | Made in Britain / The World Record | 2CD, Live |
| 2018 | Whitesnake | Unzipped | Compilation |
| 2020 | Whitesnake | The Rock Album | Compilation |
| 2020 | Whitesnake | Love Songs | Compilation |
| 2021 | Whitesnake | The Blues Album | Compilation |
| 2022 | Whitesnake | Whitesnake's Greatest Hits | Compilation |

== Revolution Saints ==
| Year | Artist | Album | Notes |
|---|---|---|---|
| 2015 | Revolution Saints | Revolution Saints | |
| 2017 | Revolution Saints | Light in the Dark | |
| 2020 | Revolution Saints | Rise | |

== The Dead Daisies ==
| Year | Artist | Album | Notes |
|---|---|---|---|
| 2016 | The Dead Daisies | Make Some Noise | |
| 2017 | The Dead Daisies | Live & Louder | Live |
| 2017 | The Dead Daisies | The Covers: Live at Planet Rock | EP |
| 2018 | The Dead Daisies | Burn It Down | |
| 2019 | The Dead Daisies | Locked and Loaded: The Covers Album | Compilation |
| 2020 | The Dead Daisies | The Lockdown Sessions | EP |
| 2021 | The Dead Daisies | Holy Ground | |
| 2022 | The Dead Daisies | Radiance | |
| 2022 | The Dead Daisies | US Fall Tour EP | EP |
| 2022 | The Dead Daisies | Live From Daisyland | |
| 2023 | The Dead Daisies | Best Of | |
| 2024 | The Dead Daisies | Resurrected, Vol. 1 | Compilation |
| 2024 | The Dead Daisies | Resurrected, Vol. 2 | Compilation |
| 2024 | The Dead Daisies | Light 'Em Up | |
| 2025 | The Dead Daisies | Lookin' for Trouble | |

=== Guest Appearances ===
- 1989 – One – Minoru Niihara
- 1989 – Cutting Air Act 1 – Air Pavilion
- 1992 - The Crimson Idol - W.A.S.P.
- 1996 – La Saga du Metal 7 – Melodique – Progressif
- 1997 (Japan) & 1999 (Europe) – Windows – Mike Vescera Project
- 1998 (Japan) & 2000 (Europe) – Ignition – Mark Boals
- 1999 – A Tribute to Early Van Halen – The Atomic Punks (Ralph Saenz)
- 1999 – Here Before – Stone
- 2000 – Mikazuki in Rock
- 2001 – Art of Mackin' – Ghetto Dynasty
- 2001–2002 – Superhero & More... – Brian McKnight
- 2002 – (1989–2002) From There to Here – Brian McKnight
- 2003 – Wake the Nations – Ken Tamplin and Friends
- 2003 – Guitar Zeus 1 – Carmine Appice's Guitar Zeus
- 2003 – Sho（照）Twist Songs – Sera Masanori
- 2003 – Wild Souls – On The Road
- 2005 – The Real Thing – Christian Tolle
- 2007 – Live for Tomorrow – Marco Mendoza
- 2007 – Wolfman Jack's Halloween Special: Fun for Kids
- 2007 – Jacaranda – Masanori Sera
- 2008 – Anthology – House of Lords
- 2009 – Play My Game – Tim "Ripper" Owens
- 2009 – Spirit of Christmas – Northern Light Orchestra
- 2009 – Conquering Heroes – Carmine Appice's Guitar Zeus
- 2009 – Stargazer – Stargazer
- 2009 – Pulling the Trigger – Cooper Inc.
- 2010 – Harder and Heavier – 60's British Invasion Goes Metal
- 2010 – Celebrate Christmas – Northern Light Orchestra
- 2011 – Oceana – Derek Sherinian
- 2013 – Artpop – Lady Gaga (guitar on "Manicure")
- 2013 – Living Like a Runaway – Lita Ford
- 2013 – Lions & Lambs – Alex De Rosso
- 2013 – Star of the East – Northern Light Orchestra
- 2014 – I'm Not Your Suicide – Michael Sweet
- 2014 – On the Road – Wild Souls
- 2014 – Eye of the Nine – Eye of the Nine
- 2014 – Knights of Badassdom – Brendan McCreary
- 2014 – Songs from the Vault, Volume 2 – Raiding the Rock Vault
- 2014 – Yurica / Hanatan – The Flower of Dim World
- 2015 – Hard to Bleed – Phill Rocker
- 2015 – Rise of the Animal – Wolfpakk
- 2016 – Now and Then – Christian Tolle Project
- 2017 – Just a Lie – David Scott Cooper
- 2017 – Howling Wolves – Sera Masanori
- 2017 – Jake J and the Killjoys – Jake J and the Killjoys
- 2017 – Star of the East – Northern Light Orchestra
- 2018 – All for Metal – Doro Pesch
- 2018 – Forever Warriors, Forever United – Doro Pesch
- 2018 – La Beriso 20 Años – Dónde Terminaré
- 2018 – Point Blank – Christian Tolle Project
- 2019 – Backstage to Heaven – Doro Pesch
- 2019 – You're the Voice – The Planet Rock All Stars
- 2019 – IRONBUNNY – Tettsui no Alternative
- 2020 – Truth in Unity – Chris Catena's Rock City Tribe
- 2020 – Make a Wish – Shortino
- 2020 – Dalej – 1ONE
- 2020 - United Guitars Vol 2 – United Guitars
- 2022 - New Direction – Marco Mendoza
- 2024 - Temple of Blues: Influences and Friends – Cactus
- 2025 - Sign of the Wolf - Sign of the Wolf

=== Tribute Albums ===
- Crossfire: A Salute to Stevie Ray Vaughan (1996)
- Forever Mod: A Tribute to Rod Stewart (1998)
- Little Guitars: A Tribute to Van Halen (2000)
- Bat Head Soup: A Tribute to Ozzy (2000)
- Metallic Assault: A Tribute to Metallica (2000)
- Tie Your MIX Down: A Tribute to Queen (2000)
- Stone Cold Queen: A Tribute to Queen (2001)
- One Way Street – Let the Tribute Do the Talkin': A Tribute to Aerosmith (2002)
- Spin the Bottle: An All-Star Tribute to Kiss (2004)
- Metallic Attack: Metallica – The Ultimate Tribute (2004)
- We Salute You: A Tribute to AC/DC (2004)
- Numbers from the Beast: An All Star Salute to Iron Maiden (2004)
- An 80's Metal Tribute to Van Halen (2006)
- Butchering the Beatles: A Headbashing Tribute to the Beatles (2006)
- Flying High Again: Tribute to Ozzy Osbourne (2006)
- Frankie Banali & Friends: Led Zeppelin Tribute – 24/7/365 (2007)
- The Omnibus Album: This Is Guitar Gods (2007)
- Northern Light Orchestra: The Spirit of Christmas (2008)
- We Wish You a Metal Xmas and a Headbanging New Year (2011)
- A World with Heroes: KISS 40th Anniversary (Calling Dr. Love) (2013)
- Thriller: A Metal Tribute to Michael Jackson (2013)
- This Is Your Life: Tribute To Ronnie James Dio (2014)
- Super Tribute to Ozzy Osbourne:(Japanese Edition) (2014)
- The House is Rocking: A Tribute to Stevie Ray Vaughan (2015)
- Immortal Randy Rhoads: The Ultimate Tribute (2015)
- Moore Blues for Gary: A Tribute to Gary Moore by Bob Daisley and Friends (2018)
- Harder & Heavier: 60's British Invasion Goes Metal (2023)
- Ride The Rainbow: The Ultimate Tribute To Blackmore's Rainbow (2026)

=== Film and television ===
- Friday the 13th: The Final Chapter Soundtrack (1984)
- The Wraith – Original Motion Picture Soundtrack (1986)
- The Transformers: The Movie (Original Motion Picture Soundtrack) (1986)
- Holiday Greetings from the Epic, Portrait and CBS Associated Families (1987)
- Digital Pinball: Last Gladiators (1995)
- Digital Pinball: Necronomicon (1996)
- Knights of Badassdom: Original Motion Picture Soundtrack (2014)
- Instruments of Destruction 1986 Transformers: The Movie 30th Anniversary (2016)
- Welcome to Daisyland: TV series soundtrack – The Dead Daisies (2019)
