= O-Shen =

- Also known as: O-Shen
- Born: Jason Hershey; 1978 (age 46–47); Spokane, Washington
- Genres: Pacific reggae, dancehall, hip hop
- Occupation: Singer
- Instrument: Vocals
- Years active: 2000–present
- Labels: Independent

Jason Hershey (born 1978 in Spokane, Washington), better known as O-Shen, is a reggae musician, raised in Papua New Guinea. O-Shen resides in Hawai'i but still visits Papua New Guinea. He raps and sings most of his songs in Tok Pisin.

== Biography ==
Born in Spokane, Washington, O-Shen was raised in Papua New Guinea from a very young age.

== Career ==
He has collaborated with Jamaican artists like Elephant Man, Third World, Black, and Uhuru. His single, Throw Away the Gun, from his album, Rascal in Paradise, was featured in the 2004 film, 50 First Dates.

== Awards ==
- 2001 Na Hoku Hanohano Award for Reggae Album of the Year

== Discography ==
=== Studio albums ===
Album	Label	Release
Iron Youth	Cinnamon Red Records	January 1, 2000
Rascal in Paradise	Hobo House on the Hill Records	2002
Kanaka Pasifika	CHM Supersound	September, 2003
Rising Son	Sharpnote Records	January 26, 2005
Faya!	Sharpnote Records	2005
Best of O-Shen	Tokuma Records	2006
1 Rebel	Sharpnote Records	July 4, 2007
Salt Water Messenger (Part 1)		2010
Saltwater Messenger	Sharpnote Records	February 16, 2011
Storm - EP	Rumble Rock Recordz	2012
In Ex-Isle	Allstar Records	April 21, 2013
Pacific Storm	Push Broom Productions Inc.	August 20, 2013

=== Singles ===
Singles	Album	Release
"Free Island People"	Island Warriors	2000
"She Looks Good" (with Ho'onu'a)	Take You to the Jam	2003
Stonehouse (Instrumental)	Left Coast Liquid Vol 1	2007
Why You Leaving		2012
I'll Never Bow		2012
I Am Who I Am. Feat Akay47		2012
I Am Who I Am (Remix) feat Prote-J		2012
Sometimes		2012
Hated By You		2012
I Like You		2012
Forget About It	Seal of Life	2013
Moony Night		2014
All Night		2014
Burnin’ Bridges		2014
Time Is Now		2014
Em I Pasin		2014
O Kumul	Only Love Riddim	2014
Mi Save Pes		2015
Let Me Out		2015
Waiting For You	Island Vibrations	2015
No Regrets		2016
Now and Then		2016
Island of Love		2016
Sapotim Yu		2016
Makmak		2017
Lovin’ Lovin’ You		2019
True True Friend		2019
You Know I Never		2020
No More Waterfalls		2020
Sunshine Vibes		2021
Say No More		2021
Look at You Survivin’		2021
Mama Never Told Me		2021
