= Robert Sarzo =

American guitarist (born 1958)

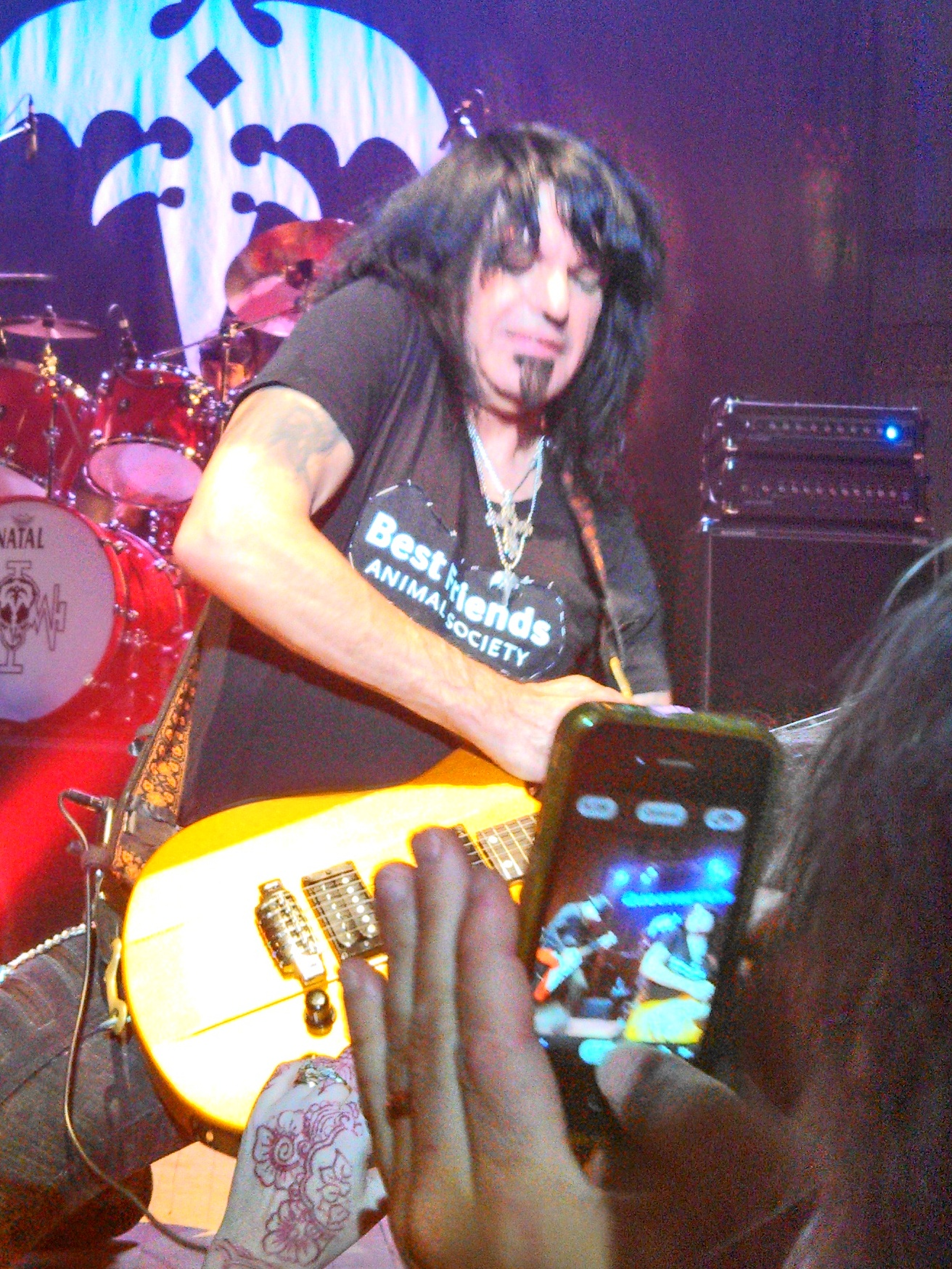
- Sarzo performing with Geoff Tate in 2013

Background information
- Also known as: VuDu Man, Roberto
- Born: October 6, 1958 (age 68)
- Genre: Heavy metal
- Occupations: Musician
- Instruments: Guitar
- Formerly of: Hurricane

Robert Sarzo Lavieille Grande Ruiz Payret y Chaumont, nicknamed "The VuDu Man", is a Cuban American guitarist. His career has spanned 40 years.

== Biography ==
Sarzo has worked with an array of people in the entertainment industry. He was hired by Ozzy and Sharon Osbourne as the original replacement for Randy Rhoads. Sarzo never went on tour with Osbourne because Jet Records' Don Arden, also Sharon's father, had hired a different guitarist, Bernie Tormé, without telling anyone.

Sarzo has worked with Interscope/Universal Record's Jimmy Iovine and legendary metal producers, Bob Ezrin and Mike Clink. He also worked with Robert Stigwood of "Saturday Night Fever" fame on numerous soundtracks such as "Times Square", D.L. Byron the writer of Pat Benatar's hit "Shadows of the Night", Reggae artist Garland Jeffreys, and the late Sam Kinison on his Leader of the Banned album. Robert formed his band Hurricane in the early 80's and went on to have hits such as "Over the Edge" and their #1 hit "I'm Onto You."

In the early 1980s, Robert was introduced to bassist Tony Cavazo by Los Angeles heavy metal band Quiet Riot's lead vocalist Kevin DuBrow. Both Robert's brother Rudy and Cavazo's brother Carlos were in Quiet Riot at the time. He later joined with Cavazo, singer Kelly Hansen and drummer Jay Schellen to form the glam metal band Hurricane.

He remained with Hurricane from 1985 until 1989. Although Hurricane released a reunion album (Liquifury) in 2001, Sarzo did not participate in this project. After many years in the studio, Sarzo worked to reform Hurricane in 2007.

Not just a heavy metal/rock and roll guitarist with a classical background, Robert Sarzo has branched out to become a producer and movie music composer. His current projects include the movies, "The Hiss", written and produced by David Lynch's daughter, Jennifer, and the 2009 wide-release "The Collector" written and produced by Marcus Dunstan writer of Saw 4, 5, & 6. Robert will be working on "The Collector" sequel in 2011.

He has opened a recording studio in Sherman Oaks and is working with his brother, Rudy, on several upcoming projects. He is endorsed by Peavey guitars, Line 6 and ChromaCast.

On January 25, 2013, it was announced that Sarzo had joined Geoff Tate's lineup after he was expelled from Queensrÿche. This band already included his brother Rudy. This is the first time the Sarzo brothers have played together in a national act. He replaced Glen Drover, who left two months earlier.

In July 2013, Sarzo released his first solo album, After the Storm, nearly 30 years after recording it. The album was released on 4818 Records.

Longtime guitarist of the American hard rock band Hurricane, he announced his departure from the group on October 27, 2023.
