= Raiding the Rock Vault =

Jukebox musical based on classic rock songs

- The show's logo
- Premiere: November 29, 2012: Mayan Theater

Raiding the Rock Vault is a jukebox musical based on classic rock songs, featuring a cast of musicians from well-known rock bands. Since its debut in 2012, the show has appeared mainly at casinos in the Las Vegas area.

== History ==
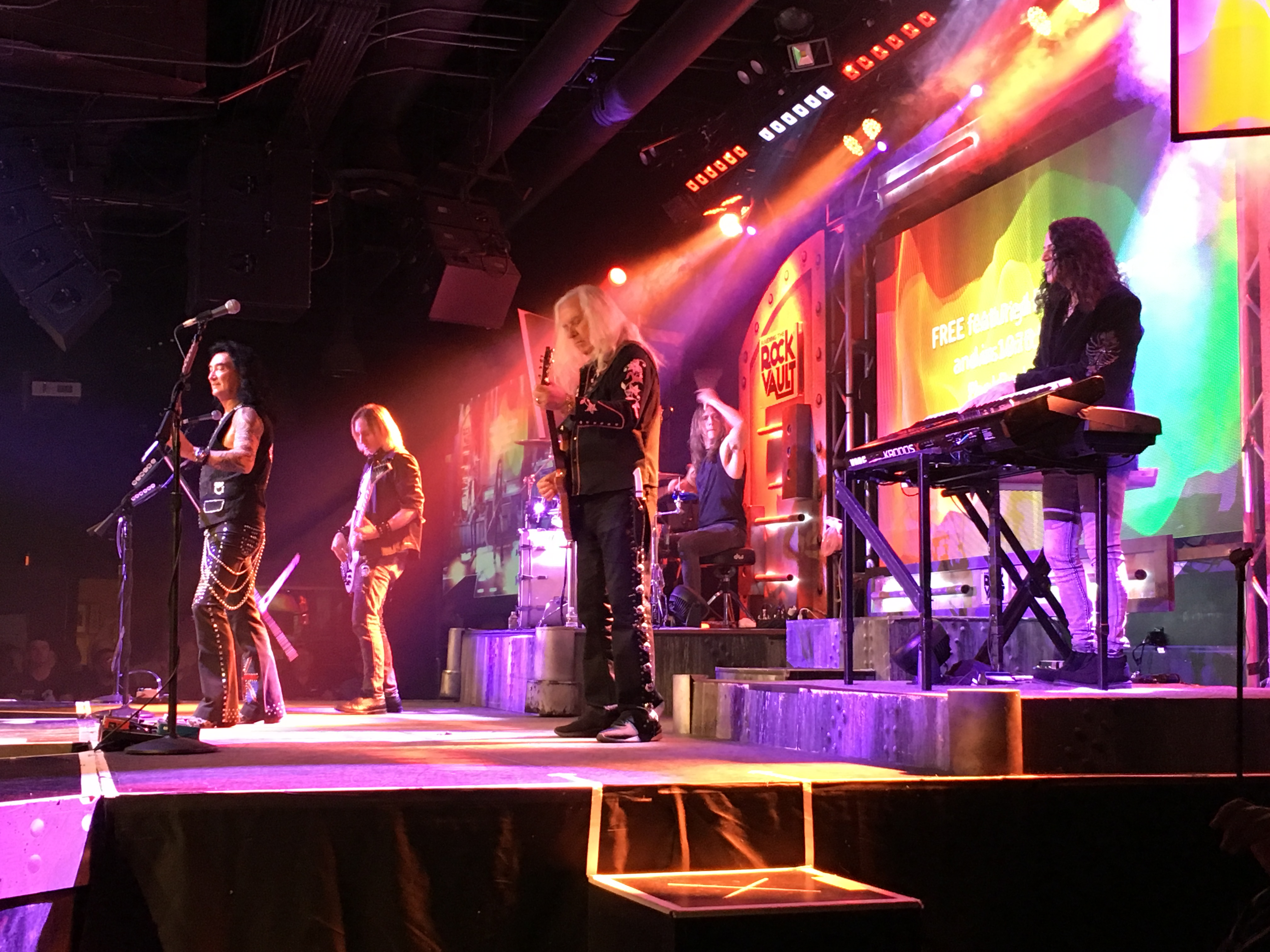
A performance of the show at the Hard Rock Hotel & Casino Las Vegas in 2019, featuring (from left to right): Robin McAuley, Christian Brady, Howard Leese, Blas Elias, and Michael T. Ross.

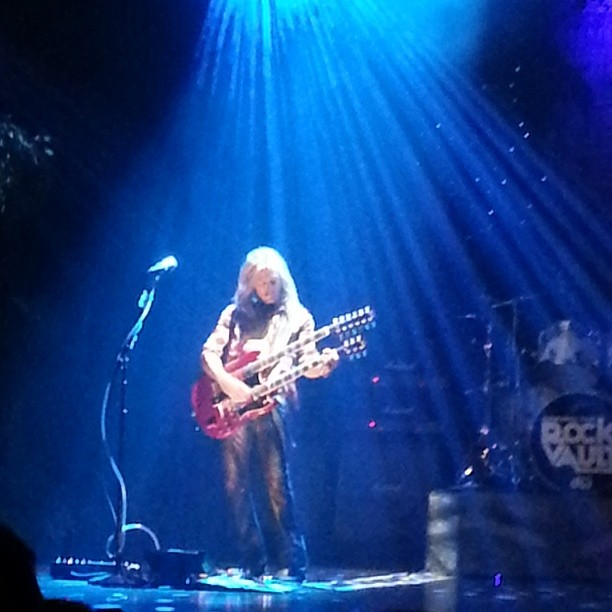
Doug Aldrich performing "Stairway to Heaven" during the show in July 2014 at the Westgate Las Vegas

The concept for the show originated in 2011 with British record producer Simon Napier-Bell, who envisioned a touring rock supergroup playing covers of hit songs from the 1960s and 1970s. Napier-Bell joined with his longtime business partner, Harry Cowell, to produce the show. They enlisted John Payne, former lead singer of the band Asia, to help develop the idea. Interest in the concept soon faded, though, because the projected production costs were too high. Months later, Payne, inspired by his involvement with the touring production of Jeff Wayne's War of the Worlds, reimagined the concept as a theatrical production with a plot line that would tell the story of rock and roll in chronological order. Payne brought record producer David Kershenbaum on to co-write the script with him. Cowell financed the show for $1 million through his publicly traded production company, Papa Entertainment.

Raiding the Rock Vault debuted on November 29, 2012, with a performance at the Mayan Theater in Los Angeles. That show was recorded to be shown to potential promoters for a concert tour. The feedback from promoters, however, suggested that the show would be well suited for Las Vegas. Cast member Paul Shortino arranged for the producers to meet with executives of the LVH – Las Vegas Hotel and Casino, and a deal was quickly reached. The show opened in March 2013 at the LVH.

Cowell fired Payne from the show in June 2014 because of an unspecified business dispute, shortly before the LVH came under new ownership and became the Westgate Las Vegas. Westgate owner David Siegel liked the show and asked to buy the rights to it, planning to rename it as Westgate Rocks; Cowell refused the offer. Uncertain about their standing at the Westgate, the producers accepted an offer to move to the Tropicana Las Vegas. Meanwhile, Payne filed a lawsuit claiming he was owed royalties and performance fees; it was eventually settled.

The show closed at the Westgate in September 2014, and then reopened in November in the 1,100-seat theater at the Tropicana. In the interim, the show was revamped to remove material developed by Payne, including the narrative about the discovery of the "rock vault" in a Mayan temple. Instead, the songs were bracketed by comedy sketches portraying stories recalled by two fictional roadies from their years of touring with rock bands.

A sister show, Raiding the Country Vault, featuring classic country music songs in a similar format, was launched by Cowell and Napier-Bell in Branson, Missouri in May 2016.

The producers ended the run at the Tropicana in July 2016, because they were not able to consistently sell the 300 to 400 tickets per night needed to cover their costs. The show started a new run in March 2017 at the 650-seat Vinyl nightclub at the Hard Rock Hotel and Casino. To fit in the smaller venue, the comedy sketches were eliminated from the show, along with the "vault" prop that had previously sat at the center of the set.

In 2017 and 2018, a second company of Raiding the Rock Vault appeared for limited engagements at the Starlite Theatre in Branson. Producers also had plans for a worldwide tour, and pop and Latin versions of the show. In December 2019, Raiding the Rock Vault played 3 shows in London, England.

In January 2020, with the Hard Rock preparing to close for renovations, the show moved to Club 172 at the Rio casino hotel. After a two-year hiatus due to the COVID-19 pandemic, the show reopened at The Duomo, a new venue at the Rio.

In 2023, the show announced it would move from the Rio to the Hard Rock Cafe at Showcase Mall.

== Cast ==
Notable musicians who have been part of the show's rotating lineup at some time include:

- Doug Aldrich
- Dave Amato
- Mark Boals
- Blas Elias
- Andrew Freeman
- Tracii Guns
- Todd Kerns
- Howard Leese
- Robin McAuley
- Hugh McDonald
- John Payne
- Rowan Robertson
- Jay Schellen
- Paul Shortino
- Johnny Solinger
- Phil Soussan
- Matt Starr
