= Rascal in Paradise =

Studio album by O-Shen
- Released: 2002
- Genre: Reggae
- Length: 39:04
- Label: Hobo House on the Hill

O-Shen chronology
Iron Youth (2000)	Rascal in Paradise (2002)	Rising Son (2004)

Rascal in Paradise is an album by O-Shen released in 2002.

== Track listing ==
1. Lumbo Chant - 1:01
2. Lonely Souljah - 3:24
3. Lus Tingting featuring "the Chief" - 4:26
4. Throw Away the Gun - 4:14
5. Carry On Rootsman - 4:24
6. I Tried (Bad Girl) featuring Fiji - 4:02
7. Cool Fever - 3:33
8. Mi Laik Kam with Apox - 3:28
9. God Bless Family - 3:57
10. I Need a Girl - 4:03
11. Siasi - 2:57

== In media ==
The song, "Throw Away the Gun", is featured in the 2004 film 50 First Dates.
