= Faya! =

Studio album by O-Shen
- Released: 2005
- Genre: Reggae
- Length: 57:43
- Label: Sharpnote Records

O-Shen chronology
Rising Son (2005)	Faya! (2005)	Best of O-Shen (2006)

Faya! is an album by the reggae musician O-Shen. It was released in 2005 by Sharpnote Records.

== Track listing ==
No.	Title	Length
1.	"Geio Geio"	3:05
2.	"For You"	3:21
3.	"Maoli Girl"	3:58
4.	"It Ain't Easy"	3:47
5.	"Tutu Gae"	4:31
6.	"Ektin Fensi"	3:34
7.	"Raramani Emau"	4:47
8.	"Birua"	3:19
9.	"Children of the World"	4:05
10.	"Ku'u Pua"	3:41
11.	"Move"	3:36
12.	"Tiko"	3:36
13.	"Strong Like a Warrior"	4:30
14.	"Suru"	3:09
15.	"Yakaka"	4:49
