= Vybrant Faya =

Ghanaian Dancehall artist

- Born: Emmanuel Kojo Quayeson; 13 April 1987; Tema, Ghana
- Died: 23 October 2016 (aged 29)
- Genres: Dancehall, hiplife
- Occupation: Singer
- Instrument: Vocals

Emmanuel Kojo Quayeson (13 April 1987- 23 October 2016) also known as Vybrant Faya was a Ghanaian dancehall artiste known for his hit song Mampi.

== Early life ==
He was born in Tema to Mr. Samuel Quayson and Miss Theresah Ackon but grew up in Ashiaman. He also has five other siblings, he comes from the Central Region

== Career ==
Vybrant Fire started recording in 2008 where he was known as Skelloh. Mr. Logic who became his manager in 2011 rebranded him and he changed his name from Skelloh to Vybrant Fire.

== Death ==
Vybrant Fire was killed by a motor rider on the Tema Motorway.

== Achievement ==
He is known for his major hit song Mampi which got everyone on their feet. He was nominated for Artiste of The Year and Best Reggae/Dancehall Song of The Year at the 2015 VGMA.
