= Brad Lang =

American bass guitarist (born 1962)

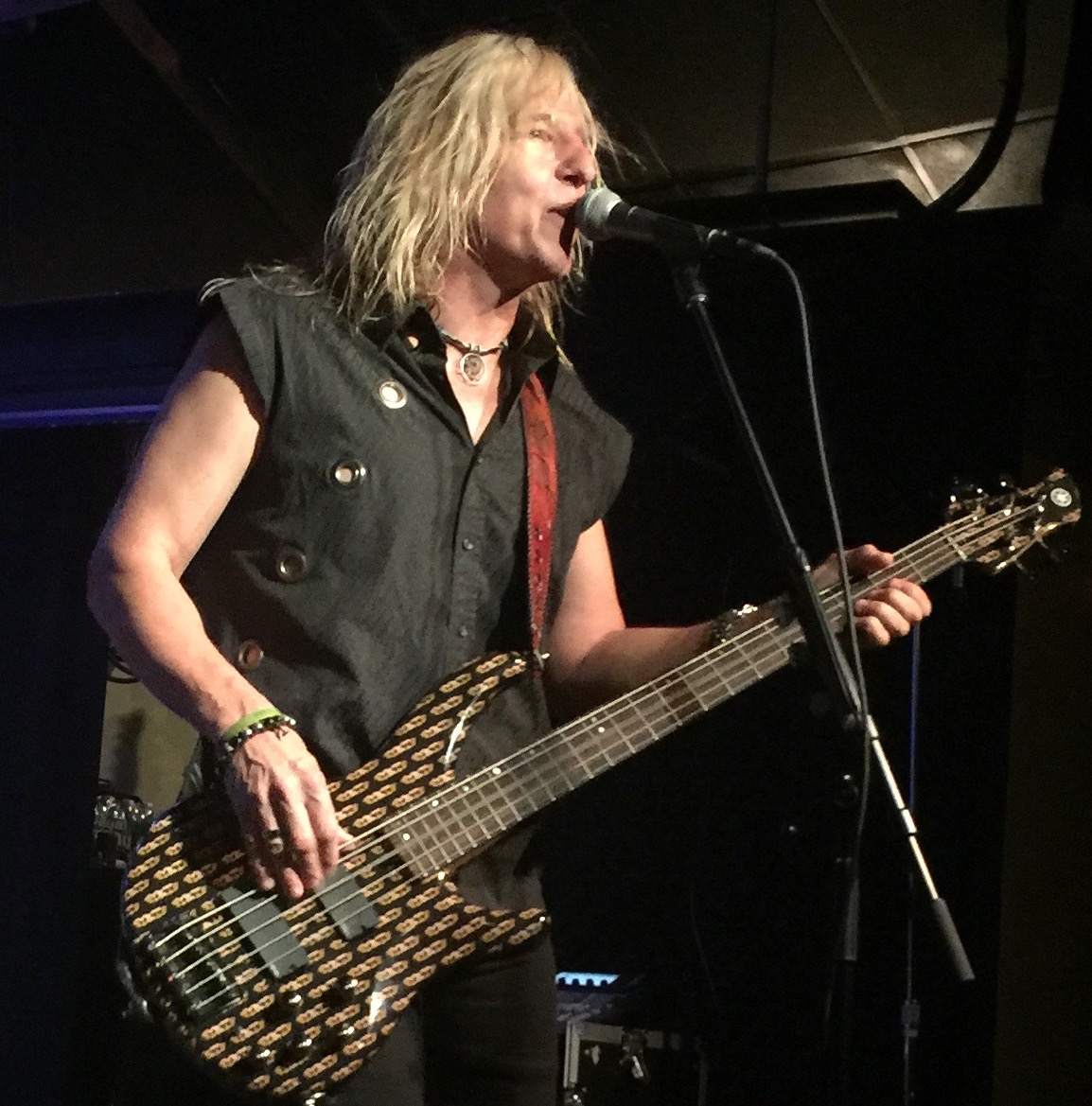
- Lang playing for Y&T in 2016

Background information
- Born: Bradley Allen Lang; March 18, 1962 (age 64); Lodi, California, U.S.
- Genres: Rock
- Occupation: Bassist
- Years active: 1986–present
- Website: basslang.wixsite.com/bradlangbass

Bradley Allen Lang (born March 18) is an American bassist. He became known for playing with Y&T, replacing long-time group member Phil Kennemore, after the latter was diagnosed with lung cancer. He later played with Bobby Blotzer's Ratt and BulletBoys.

== Career ==
Brad Lang is from Lodi, California. He began playing bass guitar after watching a friend playing bass guitar in the junior high school band. He loved how the low end of the sound drove the whole thing along. When he moved to high school, he began playing and was soon in a band named "Misty Island Evil".

In 1986, he joined the band Jet Red. Jet Red was a popular Central Valley band led by Willie Hines and included Billy Carmassi (drums) and Johnny Feikert (guitar). Jet Red produced its debut album in 1989. The album was well received but Relativity Records did not provide the proper marketing and tour support thus dooming the release. Various demo recordings were made for the follow-up album in 1991. This material was eventually released in 2010 with the album entitled "Flight Plan".

In July 2010, he was contacted by Y&T as they had learned that original bassist Phil Kennemore was diagnosed with lung cancer and unable to tour. In less than 24 hours, he learned the setlist and was on a plane to Wisconsin to play the next day. Upon Kennemore's passing in 2011, he was asked to become a full time member of Y&T.

In 2016, he left Y&T amicably for personal reasons.

In 2018, he joined Bobby Blotzer's Ratt. This version of Ratt was derailed by a series of lawsuits.

He played with Dennis DeYoung in 2018 and 2019 when his bass player was unable to perform.

He joined Burning Rain in 2019 to record the album "Face The Music" and tour.

He played in a Christmas Holiday musical experience named Luminare in 2021.

In 2022, he was asked to join the BulletBoys. In December of 2024, it was mutually decided that he would leave the BulletBoys.

== Discography ==
- Jet Red (1989)
- Jet Red "Flight Plan" (2010)
- Y&T "Live At The Mystic" (2012)
- Willie Hines "Letters To Maria" (2018)
- Burning Rain "Face The Music" (2019)
- Bulletboys "Holy Fuck" (2022)

== Contributions ==
- Tommy Tutone "Tutone.rft" (1998)
- Nick Haydn "Global Fusion" (2001)
- Concert For Ronnie Montrose "Good Rockin' Tonight" DVD (2013)
