= Liquifury =

Studio album by Hurricane
- Released: October 2001
- Recorded: Tense Tenor Studios, Glendale, California
- Genres: Heavy metal, hard rock
- Length: 50:08 (57:52)
- Labels: Frontiers Records; Avalon Records (Japan)
- Producers: Kelly Hansen, Jay Schellen

Hurricane chronology
Slave to the Thrill (1990)	Liquifury (2001)	Reconnected (2023)

Liquifury is the fourth studio album by the heavy metal band Hurricane. It was released in 2001 on Frontiers Records. The album arrived eleven years after the band's previous release, and it can be considered a "reunion" effort from the band, although two of the original four band members are absent.

== Track listing ==
1. "Intro" – 1:11
2. "River Gold" (Kelly Hansen, Jay Schellen, Sean Manning) – 4:04
3. "New God" (Hansen, Schellen, Manning) – 5:00
4. "Heart Made of Stone" (Hansen, Schellen, Manning, Tony Cavazo) – 6:07
5. "It's Your Life" (Hansen, Schellen) – 4:37
6. "Happy to Be Your Fool" (Hansen, Schellen) – 5:58
7. "Bleed For Me" (Hansen, Schellen, Carlos Villalobos) – 4:31
8. "Shelter" (Hansen, Schellen) – 4:16
9. "In My Dreams" (Hansen, Schellen, Manning) – 5:11
10. "Torn" (Hansen, Schellen) – 5:38
11. "Shine" (Hansen, Schellen, Manning) – 3:35

=== Japanese edition bonus tracks ===
12. "Push" – 3:55
13. "Promises" – 3:49

== Credits ==
- Kelly Hansen – vocals, guitars and keyboards
- Jay Schellen – drums, percussion
- Sean Manning – guitars
- Carlos Villalobos – guitars (Track 7)
- Randall Strom – guitars (Track 5)
- Larry Antonino – bass guitar

== Production ==
- Engineers – Kelly Hansen
- Mixing – Kelly Hansen and Jay Schellen
