= Kelly Hansen =

American singer (born 1961)

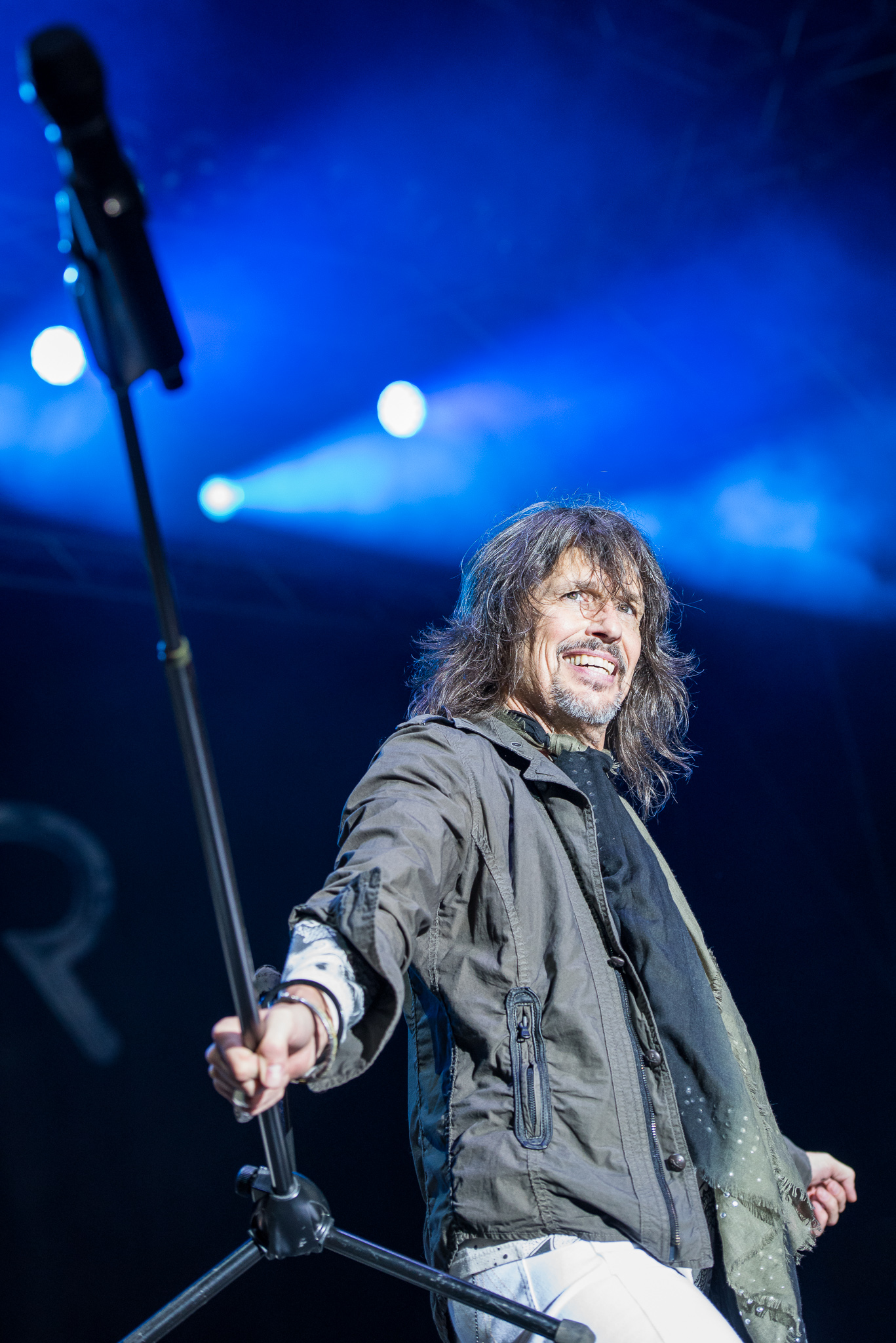
- Hansen performing with Foreigner in 2016

Background information
- Born: Kelly Hansen; April 18, 1961 (age 65); Hawthorne, California, U.S.
- Genres: Hard rock, heavy metal, glam metal
- Occupations: Singer-songwriter, musician
- Instruments: Vocals; guitar; keyboards; percussion
- Years active: 1985–present
- Member of: The Dead Daisies
- Formerly of: Foreigner, Hurricane, Unruly Child, Perfect World

Kelly Hansen (born April 18, 1961) is an American singer, best known as the lead vocalist for the rock band Foreigner from 2005 to 2025.

Hansen started his career as an independent studio singer. He later met guitarist Robert Sarzo and bassist Tony Cavazo (brothers of Rudy Sarzo and Carlos Cavazo, respectively, of Quiet Riot fame), with whom he formed the hard-rock band Hurricane in 1984. Hurricane would achieve some moderate commercial success throughout the mid-to-late 1980s and into the 1990s. However, Hurricane's record label went bankrupt in 1991 and the group disbanded shortly thereafter. Hansen continued to make music, recording as a guest and session singer for many projects, including Slash's Snakepit, Fergie Fredriksen, Don Dokken and Bourgeois Pigs. In 1998 Hansen joined the band Unruly Child, replacing vocalist Mark Free. Unruly Child recorded a new album which was released in early 1999. 2001 saw the return of Hurricane with an altered lineup and new album, Liquifury. In 2003, Hansen joined forces with Fabrizio V.Zee Grossi and recorded a self-titled album under the band name Perfect World.

Hansen joined Foreigner in 2005 after Lou Gramm left in 2003 due to continuing conflicts with Mick Jones. Hansen was the third lead singer of Foreigner after Gramm and Johnny Edwards. He departed from Foreigner following their 2025 summer tour, and was succeeded by multi-instrumentalist Luis Maldonado, who had already been a member since 2021. Folllowing his departure, Hansen joined The Dead Daisies as their frontman.

Hansen divides his time between two homes in Los Angeles – one in Calabasas and the other in Malibu.

Hansen attended Smoky Hill High School in Aurora, Colorado.

== Discography ==
=== with Hurricane ===
- Take What You Want (1985)
- Over the Edge (1988)
- Slave to the Thrill (1990)
- Liquifury (2001)

=== with Air Pavilion ===
- Sarrph Cogh (1994)
- The River / The Life (1999)

=== with Unruly Child ===
- Waiting for the Sun (1999)

=== with Stuart Smith ===
- Heaven and Earth (1999)

=== with Tim Donahue ===
- Into the Light (2000)

=== with Perfect World ===
- Perfect World (2003)

=== with Foreigner ===
- Extended Versions Live (2006)
- No End in Sight (2008)
- Can't Slow Down (2009)
- Can't Slow Down...When It's Live! Live (2010)
- Extended Versions II Live (2011)
- Acoustique: The Classics Unplugged (2011)
- Jukebox Heroes (2012)
- An Acoustic Evening With Foreigner Live (2013)
- I Want To Know What Love Is - The Ballads (2014)
- Greatest Hits Live Live (2015)
- In Concert - Unplugged (2016)
- 40 - Forty Hits From Forty Years: 1977-2017 (2017)
- With The 21st Century Symphony Orchestra & Chorus Live (2018)
- Double Vision: Then And Now - Live Reloaded Live (2019)

=== Guest appearances ===
- "Anything Goes" (from the compilation album, A Tribute to Guns N' Roses - Appetite for Reconstruction) (1999)
- "Rock of Ages" (from the compilation album, A Tribute to Def Leppard - Leppardmania) (2000)
- "Rock You Like a Hurricane" (from the compilation album, A Tribute to The Scorpions - Covered Like a Hurricane) (2000)
