= Iron Youth =

Studio album by O-Shen
- Released: 2000
- Genre: Reggae
- Label: Cinnamon Red Records

O-Shen chronology
Iron Youth (2000)	Rascal in Paradise (2002)

Iron Youth is O-Shen's debut album, released in 2000.

== Track listing ==
1. Honolulu - 5:00
2. Pacifican Herbsman - 3:58
3. Pretty Wahine - 3:56
4. Island Warriors - 3:43
5. Wat'cha Gonna Do - 4:18
6. Girl - 4:15
7. Nation of Confusion - 5:02
8. Meri Lewa - 3:56
9. Melanesia - 3:30
10. Planet Earth - 5:12
