= Coroner (album) =

Compilation album by Coroner
- Released: March 1995
- Recorded: March 1987 – February 1995
- Genres: Technical thrash metal; progressive metal; avant-garde metal
- Length: 72:51
- Label: Noise
- Producer: Coroner

Coroner chronology
Grin (1993)	Coroner (1995)	The Unknown Unreleased Tracks 1985–95 (1996)

Professional ratings
Review scores
Source	Rating
AllMusic	4/5 stars
Collector's Guide to Heavy Metal	8/10

Coroner is the penultimate release by the Swiss thrash metal band Coroner. It is technically a compilation album, although it features new material as well as selected songs from the band's previous albums. It was originally regarded as their final album, even though it was succeeded by a final compilation of unreleased material in 1996, titled The Unknown Unreleased Tracks 1985–95. The band chose to go into the studio for the last time, instead of releasing a greatest hits compilation, even though they had disbanded officially in 1994 (on some of the tracks, Marky Edelmann and Ron Broder are replaced by session musicians).

== Track listing ==
No.	Title	Writer(s)	From the album	Length
1.	"Benway's World" (new recording)	Ron Broder, Marky Edelmann, Tommy Vetterli		0:49
2.	"The Favorite Game" (new recording)	Edelmann, Vetterli		4:30
3.	"Shifter" (new recording)	Edelmann, Vetterli		4:50
4.	"Serpent Moves"	Edelmann, Vetterli	Grin	6:13
5.	"Snow Crystal" (new recording)	Broder, Edelmann, Vetterli		0:37
6.	"Divine Step (Conspectu Mortis)"	Broder, Edelmann, Vetterli	Mental Vortex	6:21
7.	"Gliding Above While Being Below" (new recording)	Vetterli		3:37
8.	"Der Mussolini" (new recording, Deutsch Amerikanische Freundschaft cover)	Robert Görl, Gabi Delgado-López		3:39
9.	"Last Entertainment (T.V. Bizarre)"	Broder, Edelmann, Vetterli	No More Color	3:51
10.	"Reborn Through Hate"	Broder, Edelmann, Vetterli	R.I.P.	4:02
11.	"Golden Cashmere Sleeper, Part 1" (new recording)	Edelmann, Vetterli		4:57
12.	"Golden Cashmere Sleeper, Part 2" (new recording)	Vetterli		4:59
13.	"Masked Jackal"	Broder, Edelmann, Vetterli	Punishment for Decadence	5:01
14.	"I Want You (She's So Heavy)" (The Beatles cover)	Lennon–McCartney	Mental Vortex	7:15
15.	"Grin" (No Religion Remix)	Edelmann, Vetterli		8:25
16.	"Purple Haze" (Radio Live Cut)	Jimi Hendrix		3:45

== Personnel ==
Coroner

- Ron Broder – vocals/bass
- Tommy Vetterli – guitars
- Marky Edelmann – drums, vocals, producer, art direction

Additional musicians

- Peter Haas – drums on tracks 2, 3 & 11
- Chris Vetterli – bass on track 12
- Lui Cubello – vocals (background)
- Paul Degayler – vocals
- Angela Giger – synthesizer
- Janelle Sadler – vocals (background)
- Steve Gruden – vocals (background)
- Kent Smith – keyboards
- Val – Conga

=== Other credits ===
- Guy Bidmead – producer, engineer
- Scott Burns – mixing
- Coroner – producer
- Vovo Faux-Pas – engineer
- Paolo Fedrigoli – producer, engineer, remixing, mixing
- Jan Garber – engineer
- Mischa Good – design
- Pete Hinton – producer
- Harris Johns – producer
- Dan Johnson – mixing
- Glenn Miller – mastering
- Tom Morris – producer, engineer, mixing
- Mark Prator – assistant engineer
- Steve Rispin – engineer
- Fabian Scheffold – art direction, photography
- Sven Sonquest – engineer
- István Vizner – art direction
- Karl-Ulrich Walterbach – executive producer
- Gerhard Wolfle – engineer

== Notes ==
- The samples from "Shifter" are from the 1982 documentary The Killing of America.
- The samples from "Gliding above while Being Below" are from the 1980 film Altered States.
- Track 14, "I Want You (She's So Heavy)" is a Beatles cover.
- Track 16, "Purple Haze" is a live cover of the famous Jimi Hendrix song.
- Track 8, "Der Mussolini" is a D.A.F. cover.
- Tracks 4, 6, 10 and 13 are edited version of their original releases
