= Energetic Disassembly =

Studio album by Watchtower
- Released: November 30, 1985
- Recorded: 1985
- Studios: Cedar Creek Studio and Earth and Sky Studio
- Genres: Progressive metal; technical thrash metal
- Length: 37:41
- Labels: Zombo, Institute of Art, Monster, Rockadrome
- Producer: Watchtower

Watchtower chronology
| Energetic Disassembly (1985) | Control and Resistance (1989) |

Professional ratings
Review scores
| Source | Rating |
|---|---|
| AllMusic | 4.5/5 stars |

Energetic Disassembly is the debut album by American progressive metal band Watchtower, released in 1985. It is the band's only album to feature vocalist Jason McMaster and guitarist Billy White, who were replaced by Alan Tecchio and Ron Jarzombek respectively for their next album Control and Resistance.

Energetic Disassembly has been recognized as one of the first albums in the technical thrash metal genre and as "the recording most responsible for the development of the progressive metal genre". Chuck Schuldiner of Death cited the album as a significant influence on the band's transition from traditional death metal to technical death metal on their 1991 album Human.

== Overview ==
An earlier version of Energetic Disassembly, recorded at B.O.S.S. (short for Bob O'Neill Sound Studios) for Rainforest Records (home to S.A. Slayer), was scrapped when the label closed its doors. These "lost" recordings have since been released as part of the 2002 Demonstrations in Chaos archives release. The album also contains a re-recording of the song "Meltdown", first recorded in 1983 for the Cottage Cheese from the Lips of Death compilation.

Energetic Disassembly was originally released on the band's own label, Zombo Records. Zombo was the name of the band's then-manager's mute dog. Financed by drummer Rick Colaluca, 3,000 LPs and 1,500 cassettes were pressed up at the time.

In 1993, Germany's Institute of Art label issued Energetic Disassembly on CD for the first time. A further IoA reissue with slightly altered artwork followed in 1997. Texas-based Monster Underground, formerly Monster Records, would reissue Energetic Disassembly in October 2004. The album was re-released for a fourth time in 2008 via Rockadrome, formerly Monster Underground.

Energetic Disassembly is also known to have been bootlegged both on vinyl and CD.

== Track listing ==
All songs written by Jason McMaster, Billy White, Doug Keyser and Rick Colaluca

1. "Violent Change" – 3:22
2. "Asylum" – 3:48
3. "Tyrants in Distress" – 5:59
4. "Social Fears" – 4:41
5. "Energetic Disassembly" – 4:39
6. "Argonne Forest" – 4:38
7. "Cimmerian Shadows" – 6:35
8. "Meltdown" – 3:59

== Personnel ==
- Jason McMaster – vocals
- Billy White – guitars
- Doug Keyser – bass
- Rick Colaluca – drums
