= Coroner (disambiguation) =

A coroner is a government official who investigates human deaths and determines cause of death.

Coroner or The Coroner may also refer to:

- Coroner (band), a Swiss thrash metal band
  - Coroner (album), by the Swiss band
- Coroner (TV series), a 2019 Canadian dramatic television series
- "The Coroner", a song by Devil Sold His Soul on their album A Fragile Hope
- The Coroner, 2015 British dramatic television series
- The Coroner (novel), a novel by M. R. Hall
