= Concepts of Math: Book One =

EP by Watchtower
- Released: October 7, 2016
- Genres: Progressive metal; technical thrash metal
- Length: 29:08
- Label: Prosthetic Records

Watchtower chronology
Demonstrations in Chaos (2002)	Concepts of Math: Book One (2016)

Concepts of Math: Book One is the first EP by the American progressive metal band Watchtower, and was released on October 7, 2016. An anticipation of Watchtower's upcoming third album Mathematics, the EP contains four previously released tracks and one brand new song ("Mathematica Calculis"). "The Size of Matter" was previously released in 2010 as a digital single, and "M-Theory Overture", "Arguments Against Design" and "Technology Inaction" were digitally released separately in 2015.

Work on new material under the Watchtower name began in 2000, when they were working on the follow-up to Control and Resistance (1989), titled Mathematics. The band had re-recorded the album at least three times (in 2000, 2004 and 2010), but personnel changes, band members focusing on other projects and the slow pace of writing and recording caused the album to be delayed indefinitely. The Concepts of Math: Book One EP was released in favor of Mathematics, though the band has not ruled out the possibility of finishing the album.

== History ==
=== Work on Mathematics (2001–2002) ===
By early 2001, reports of a third Watchtower album in the works, titled Mathematics, had surfaced. In August of that year, Jarzombek stated that, "We only have one song left to write musically. Doug Keyser, who is writing all of the lyrics, has maybe four or 5 songs left. There will be 11 tracks, including the opening 11 1/2 minute trilogy piece, and a 9-minute instrumental." In November, it was reported that Jarzombek had "tracked the guitars to 4 songs, a proposed demo recording the band may or may not shop to interested labels, with bassist Doug Keyser and drummer Rick Colaluca working on their respective tracks as we speak."

In May 2002, Jarzombek stated on Watchtower's official website that they had "finished writing all of the music" for Mathematics, and that it would be released "whenever". Jarzombek added, "I don't have any control over Doug or Rick's schedules, so I don't know when they'll be done with their tracks. But to get a rough idea of the progress on the Mathematics recordings, we are still in pre-production. The same exact place we were about 3 months ago." Later that month, Watchtower released a compilation of early recordings, titled Demonstrations in Chaos.

=== Shelving and reworking on Mathematics (2002–2010) ===
In November 2002, frontman Jason McMaster posted a lengthy update on the status and delay of the release of Mathematics:

Attention... Since we have released the information about Watchtower releasing an ALL NEW CD... 'Mathematics' .. people will not leave it alone. They won't let WATCHTOWER sleep... I receive emails everyday from hardcore Watchtower fans, living and breathing the arrival of Mathematics..... a release long awaited of course. The revival has definitely started with the reformation of the almost original line up, and the reunion at Bang Your Head / Balingen Germany July 1, 2000.

I am sorry to give you no new information on Mathematics. It is only the mention of the word Mathematics that has thrown fans into a frenzy for new material from Watchtower. We apologize sincerely for possible premature mention and 'coming soon' tactics for the release of this seemingly "legendary before its own time" release from Watchtower. It's not happening any faster.

The best thing about this mess, is that we know how much Watchtower might mean to some of you, and this is very pleasing. Please do not give up, but do not expect months to be the clock, it has been years and might take years to complete 'Mathematics'.

Accept this as a letter of intent, intentions are as said, to complete and release this CD, but not in due time.

Keep the faith, defend the faith. Jason.

Also in November 2002, Jarzombek stated that Watchtower was "going extremely slow." He added, "Mostly because the four of us already had hectic schedules when we decided to squeeze Tower into full-time jobs, part-time jobs, teaching, gigging, family, and whatever else came up. It's not an excuse, just reality. Honestly, I think we should have just played the Bang Your Head festival in 2000 and left it at that. But we've had the material written for Mathematics for over a year now, and it will be killer when we finally do record the CD. And about a release date, don't even ask. I have no idea..."

On November 29, 2004, Jarzombek reported that Watchtower been "tweaking the music and finishing up lyrics" for Mathematics for several months. He added that, "Last weekend, Rick went into Melody Ranch studios here in San Antonio, and recorded drums for the first half of the songs. The rest of us will record our tracks in our own home studios. The plan is to complete the first half of the songs, then begin shopping the CD while the rest of the material is being recorded." Jarzombek also stated that he did not know when Mathematics would be released, and added that, "I have a timetable in my head that I'm following, but I don't want to get into any of that for obvious reasons."

In an August 2009 interview, Jarzombek mentioned that Watchtower was in "writing/recording mode", and Colaluca had recorded three songs "the other day". He finished his sentence, stating that, "We still have to complete writing the last song for Mathematics, and then rehearse the final four songs before Rick can record them." A month later, Jarzombek stated that, despite no release date in sight, the band was doing their "best to finish up a 62-minute, 11-song disc, [were] having bi-weekly rehearsals, drum studio sessions happen bi-monthly."

In January 2010, Watchtower posted a short video clip of drummer Colaluca practicing the song "Projections", expected to appear on Mathematics.

=== Reunion with Alan Tecchio and release of Concepts of Math: Book One (2010–2016) ===
By April 2010, Watchtower had reunited with Control and Resistance-era vocalist Alan Tecchio. That same month, the band released a preliminary mix of their first song in 21 years, titled "The Size of Matter", on their MySpace page; it later became available for download and purchase on Amazon.com. A month later, however, it was announced that Tecchio had left Watchtower once again for personal reasons, and that the band was auditioning a replacement for him.

In September 2010, on the status of Mathematics, Jarzombek stated:

Seems like whenever Watchtower try to complete Mathematics, we hit a snag, roadblock, or wall. We've re-worked the material for the third time now (2000, 2004, and now 2010), and I'm just tired of talking about it. It's REALLY getting old. You guys can keep asking me, but the answer will be the same... I really don't know when the CD will be done. I really don't. We need to get the damn thing done sometime, somehow, some way. But we have over an hour of good material sitting around waiting to be recorded and released. If we can just get this vocalist situation worked out, we should be fine. In April 2010 we digitally released "The Size of Matter" and played the Keep It True festival in Germany and I thought at that point we would for sure get back on track and get the recordings done (just like I did in 2000 and 2004). So we'll just have to wait and see what happens.

Watchtower never announced an official replacement for Tecchio, and was on hiatus until 2015, when the band reunited with him for three new songs "M-Theory Overture", "Arguments Against Design" and "Technology Inaction" intended for Mathematics. These songs were released online separately in October of that year.

On February 16, 2016, it was announced that Watchtower was signed to Prosthetic Records, and was going to release a new EP, titled Concepts of Math: Book One, on limited edition vinyl and digipack CD later that year. On September 9, 2016, it was announced that the EP would be released on October 7, 2016.

When asked by a Watchtower fan on Facebook in July 2020 about the current state of the band, drummer Rick Colaluca stated, "We've had discussions a few times over the past several years about finishing recording Mathematics (Concepts of Math Book 1 was about half of the project), but there are a couple of sticking points that we just can't seem to get past. We actually have a good bit of the remaining songs recorded to some degree. We also talked about reforming to tour after Concepts was released, but it just never happened. We could never really agree on what we wanted to do and how to prepare for it, which would be a huge task given that we haven't played these songs live in many years. I would like to do some sort of reunion and finish up the recording, but as of right now it doesn't look like it's in the cards to do so.".

== Track listing ==
All tracks are written by Alan Tecchio, Ron Jarzombek, Doug Keyser and Rick Colaluca.

No.	Title	Length
1.	"M-Theory Overture"	3:49
2.	"Arguments Against Design"	4:12
3.	"Technology Inaction"	6:20
4.	"The Size of Matter"	4:54
5.	"Mathematica Calculis"	9:55

== Personnel ==
- Alan Tecchio – vocals
- Ron Jarzombek – guitar
- Doug Keyser – bass
- Rick Colaluca – drums
