= Horrorscension =

Studio album by Behold... The Arctopus
- Released: October 23, 2012
- Recorded: February 21–23 and March 7–16, 2012
- Studios: Menegroth, The Thousand Caves
- Genres: Progressive metal Technical death metal
- Length: 28:18
- Label: Black Market Activities

Behold... The Arctopus chronology
Skullgrid (2007)	Horrorscension (2012)	Cognitive Emancipation (2016)

Horrorscension is the second studio album from Behold... The Arctopus, released in 2012 on Black Market Activities. This is the first album to feature drummer Weasel Walter after the departure of previous drummer Charlie Zeleny in 2009.

Professional ratings
Review scores
Source	Rating
Exclaim!	(8/10)

== Track listing ==
No.	Title	Length
1.	"Disintegore"	3:37
2.	"Monolithic Destractions"	4:03
3.	"Horrorsentience"	6:19
4.	"Deluge of Sores"	2:49
5.	"Putrefucktion"	1:04
6.	"Annihilvore"	10:29
Total length:		28:18

== Personnel ==
- Colin Marston – bass guitar, recording, mastering, mixing
- Mike Lerner – electric guitar, additional recording (guitar solos 1, 3–6), additional editing
- Weasel Walter – drums, additional recording,
