= Byblos International Festival =

Festival held in Byblos, Lebanon

The Byblos International Festival is a Lebanese festival held in Byblos, believed to be the first Phoenician city, founded around 5000 BC. The festival is the biggest in Lebanon, and attracts thousands of tourists from all over the world.

== History ==
The International Festival has been held annually since 1998, in July. It takes place by the seaside in the historic quarter, in front of the castle built by Crusaders in the 12th century. The festival's aims are to boost tourism, promote the Lebanese culture, and spread music and art from the Middle East to the rest of the world.

== Performances ==
=== 2003 ===
- Oum (a musical about the life of Umm Kulthum)
- Gregorian
- Gotan Project
- Tosca
- Blind Boys of Alabama
- John Mayall & The Bluesbreakers

=== 2004 ===
- Bryan Ferry
- Star Academy Arab World
- Erik Truffaz
- Jimmy Cliff
- Munir Bashir Group (a group formed in memory of Munir Bashir)
- Placebo

=== 2005 ===
- Roger Hodgson
- Buena Vista Social Club presents Omara Portuondo
- Aziza Mustafa Zadeh

=== 2006 ===
- Francis Cabrel
- Barbara Hendricks

=== 2007 ===
- Nouvelle Vague
- Alessandro Safina

=== 2008 ===
- Patti Smith
- Vaya Con Dios
- Barbatuques
- Chucho Valdés Quintet
- Michel Legrand

On 12 July 2008, midway through the festival, Byblos held a Nuit Blanche. Among those who performed that night were:

- Lumi
- Sebastien Tellier
- Mouse on Mars

=== 2009 ===
- Loreena McKennitt
- Keane
- Grease
- Jethro Tull
- Misia
- Gonzales (musician)
- Cocorosie
- Y.A.S.

=== 2010 ===
- Tribute to Wadih el Safi with Najwa Karam and Wael Kfoury
- Mashrou' Leila
- Caetano Veloso
- Jesse Cook
- Gorillaz
- Riverdance
- Le Nozze di Figaro (an opera by Mozart)

=== 2011 ===
- A musical based on Don Quixote, created by Marwan Ghadi and Oussama Rahbani.
- Scorpions
- Moby
- Florent Pagny
- Jamie Cullum
- Thirty Seconds to Mars
- Amadou & Mariam
- Les Mystères Lyriques

=== 2012 ===
- Slash
- Julien Clerc
- B.B. King
- Ute Lemper
- Kadim Al Sahir
- Snow Patrol
- Tinariwen

=== 2013 ===
- Yanni
- Nightwish
- Anuryzm
- CeeLo Green
- Lana Del Rey
- Pet Shop Boys
- OneRepublic
- Rahbani Summer Night
- Paco De Lucia
- Scorpions

=== 2014 ===
- Lang Lang
- Marcel Khalife
- Yanni
- Massive Attack
- Epica
- Stromae
- Mulatu Astatke and Ibrahim Maalouf
- Guy Manoukian
- Beirut

=== 2015 ===
- John Legend
- The Script
- Rodrigo Y Gabriela
- Gregory Porter
- Mireille Mathieu
- Hiba Tawaji
- Alt-J

== See also ==
- Beiteddine Festival
- Baalbeck International Festival
- Ehmej Festival
