= Grin (Coroner album) =

Studio album by Coroner
- Released: 10 September 1993
- Recorded: February–April 1993
- Studio: Greenwood Studios, Switzerland
- Genre: Progressive metal; groove metal; industrial metal; avant-garde metal
- Length: 57:47
- Label: Noise
- Producer: Coroner

Coroner chronology
Mental Vortex (1991)	Grin (1993)	Coroner (1995)

Coroner studio album chronology
Mental Vortex (1991)	Grin (1993)	Dissonance Theory (2025)

Professional ratings
Review scores
Source	Rating
AllMusic	4.5/5 stars
Collector's Guide to Heavy Metal	8/10
Metal Temple	8/10

Grin is the fifth studio album by the Swiss thrash metal band Coroner, released in 1993. It was the band's final album before their fourteen-year break up from 1996 to 2010, and other than several new tracks on the 1995 compilation album Coroner, Grin was the last studio album by the band until the 2025 release of Dissonance Theory. It is also the last Coroner album to feature drummer Marky Edelmann, who left the band in 2014.

== Musical style ==
Grin is considered a major departure from Coroner's previous works, moving to much greater experimentation. It is more focused on the aspects of progressive and technical metal, as opposed to the traditional thrash metal template of its predecessors. The album also incorporates elements of alternative metal, groove metal and industrial metal, and retains some of the avant-garde influences from the band's previous albums No More Color (1989) and Mental Vortex (1991).

== Reissues ==
After being out of print for many years, Noise/BMG reissued the album in 2018, remastered with additional photographs of the band and memorabilia.

== Track listing ==
All lyrics are written by Marquis Marky; all music is composed by Tommy T. Baron, except where noted.

No.	Title	Music	Length
1.	"Dream Path" (instrumental)		1:13
2.	"The Lethargic Age"		4:17
3.	"Internal Conflicts"		6:19
4.	"Caveat (To the Coming)"	Baron, Royce	6:39
5.	"Serpent Moves"		7:38
6.	"Status: Still Thinking"	Baron, Royce	6:14
7.	"Theme for Silence" (instrumental)		1:32
8.	"Paralyzed, Mesmerized"		8:07
9.	"Grin (Nails Hurt)"		7:21
10.	"Host"		8:24
Total length:			57:47

== Personnel ==
Coroner

- Ron Broder (as Ron Royce) – vocals, bass
- Tommy Vetterli (as Tommy T. Baron) – guitars
- Marky Edelmann (as Marquis Marky) – drums, spoken word on "Host", art direction

Additional musicians

- Kent Smith – keyboards & synthesizer
- Roger Dupont – programming on "The Lethargic Age" and the instrumentals
- Tim Chatfield – didgeridoo on "Status: Still Thinking" and the instrumentals
- Paul Degoyler – additional vocals on "Grin (Nails Hurt)"
- Bettina Klöti – additional vocals on "Host"

Production

- Tom Morris – engineer, mixing
- Gerhard Woelfe – engineer
- Voco Faux–Pas – drum engineer
- Mark Prator – assistant engineer
- Eddy Schreyer – mastering
- Istvan Vizner – art direction, photography
- Martin Becker – photography
- Peter Vahlefeld – graphics
- Karl–U. Walterbach – executive producer

== Notes ==
- The film Aliens is sampled at the start of "Internal Conflicts". The voices are Bill Paxton and Colette Hiller.
- Polish technical death metal band Sceptic covered the song "Paralyzed, Mesmerized" for their 2005 album Internal Complexity.
