= Solitarily Speaking of Theoretical Confinement =

Studio album by Ron Jarzombek
- Released: December 10, 2002
- Recorded: 2002
- Genre: Progressive metal
- Length: 44:42
- Label: Mr. Kitty
- Producer: Ron Jarzombek

Ron Jarzombek chronology
PHHHP! (1998)	Solitarily Speaking of Theoretical Confinement (2002)	The Machinations of Dementia (2007)

Solitarily Speaking of Theoretical Confinement is the second solo album by progressive metal guitarist Ron Jarzombek, released in 2002.

Every song follows a loose concept of basing each song's composition on certain songwriting systems created by Jarzombek himself; the song titles are usually humorous references to these systems, explained in the liner notes: For example, "To B or Not to B" consists of 2 themes, one only using the note B ("To B"), and using every note except for B ("Not to B"); "A Headache and a Sixty-Fourth" has a constant alternating time signature pattern of 4/4 and 1/64.

== Track listing ==
1. "Wait a Second..." - 0:04
2. "A Headache and a Sixty-Fourth" - 1:42
3. "I've Got the Runs" - 1:20
4. "Spelling Bee" - 0:42
5. "911" - 0:58
6. "Melodramatic Chromatic" - 1:19
7. "To B or Not to B" - 0:44
8. "Dramatic Chromatic" - 2:09
9. "Frank Can Get Drunk and Eat Beer" - 0:56
10. "Battle of the Hands" - 1:57
11. "About Face" - 0:49
12. "Having Second Thoughts" - 1:56
13. "Two-Face" - 0:04
14. "7 Up" - 0:49
15. "Sabbatic Chromatic" - 1:35
16. "207.222.200.112" - 0:14
17. "Grizzly Bears Don't Fly Airplanes" - 0:15
18. "Snuff" - 2:45
19. "Sex With Squeakie" - 1:28
20. "Two Thirds of Satan" - 2:38
21. "At The 7-11" - 1:03
22. "On Second Thought" - 0:56
23. "The Whole Truth, Nothing But..." - 0:20
24. "Sick, Dirty, Sick" - 0:52
25. "Minor Yours" - 0:42
26. "Minor Else!" - 0:55
27. "Give Me a Break" - 0:04
28. "Yum Yum Tree" - 1:20
29. "At the Stop-N-Go" - 1:16
30. "On a Scale from 1 to 10" - 1:08
31. "Static Chromatic" - 0:41
32. "Rigid Dude" - 0:39
33. "Erratic Chromatic" - 1:22
34. "WatchTower" - 0:14
35. "Back and Forth" - 0:41
36. "Demented" - 0:08
37. "1st and 10" - 1:09
38. "Gimme 5" - 1:23
39. "In the Name of Ron" - 1:11
40. "I've Got the Runs Again" - 0:48
41. "Tri, Tri Again" - 0:53
42. "9 to 5" - 1:17
43. "I've Got The Runs Really Bad" - 0:58
44. "Gee!" - 0:03
45. "I'll Be Back..." - 0:15

All songs composed by Ron Jarzombek.

== Personnel ==
The "line-up" for the album actually consisted only of Ron Jarzombek; the other "band members" are actually samples from sound modules with pseudonyms of their own.

- Ron Jarzombek - guitars, bass, drum programming
- Roland Emessy I - strings and synths (Roland MSE1)
- Prodeus Effecks - piano, harp, bells, marimba, B3 and Chinese gong (Proteus FX)
- Dee Fore - drums and percussion (Alesis D4)
