= Watchtower (band) =

American progressive metal band

- Origin: Austin, Texas, U.S.
- Genres: Progressive metal; technical thrash metal
- Years active: 1982–1993; 1999–2010; 2015–2016; 2022–present
- Labels: Rockadrome; Noise; Prosthetic
- Spinoffs: Blotted Science; Spastic Ink; Gordian Knot; Dangerous Toys
- Members: Doug Keyser; Rick Colaluca; Ron Jarzombek; Jason McMaster
- Past members: Billy White; Mike Soliz; Alan Tecchio

Watchtower is an American progressive metal band based in Austin, Texas, active from 1982 to 1993 and they have reunited occasionally since 1999. To date, the band has released two studio albums―Energetic Disassembly (1985) and Control and Resistance (1989)―as well as one compilation album, four digital singles, one EP and three demo cassettes. They are also notable for featuring vocalist Jason McMaster, who left Watchtower after the release of Energetic Disassembly to form Dangerous Toys, and was replaced by Alan Tecchio, who appeared on Control and Resistance and the band's 2016 EP Concepts of Math: Book One. After leaving the band once again in 2010, McMaster returned to Watchtower a second time in 2023.

Influenced by progressive rock and the new wave of British heavy metal (NWOBHM), Watchtower has been credited (along with Voivod and Coroner) for pioneering technical thrash metal. Their debut, Energetic Disassembly, has been cited as "the recording most responsible for the development of the progressive metal genre" and recognized as the first technical thrash metal album. Both Energetic Disassembly and Control and Resistance were strong influences on the emerging of technical death metal.

== History ==
=== Initial career (1982–1993) ===
Watchtower was formed in May 1982 in Austin, Texas. The quartet made its recording debut in 1983 with an early version of the song "Meltdown", included on the Cottage Cheese from the Lips of Death – A Texas Hardcore Compilation album. It was followed by the debut album, Energetic Disassembly, issued in 1985 on the band's own label, Zombo Records. An earlier version of the album was scrapped after the group's label, Rainforest Records, closed its doors. Energetic Disassembly is notable for heavy use of time changes, is considered a landmark in progressive metal, and has been called the first technical thrash metal album. After the album release, Watchtower toured with Slayer, Anthrax, Helstar, Celtic Frost, Voivod, and Armored Saint.

In the fall of 1986, guitarist and founding member Billy White quit the band to pursue different music styles. He formed the short-lived Khymera with Juggernaut drummer Bobby Jarzombek and former Karion bassist Pete Perez, before joining vocalist Don Dokken for his 1990 solo album, Up from the Ashes. With Watchtower's future in doubt, Doug Keyser auditioned for Metallica following bassist Cliff Burton's death. Jason McMaster was approached by Pantera in search of a new vocalist. McMaster left in 1988 after signing a major label deal with his side project Onyxx, later renamed Dangerous Toys, whose self-titled debut album on CBS yielded the MTV hits "Teas'n, Pleas'n" and "Scared" and reached near-gold status.

White's replacement was Ron Jarzombek, formerly with S.A. Slayer, while Mike Soliz (ex-Militia, Assalant) was recruited in place of McMaster, and eventually replaced by former Hades vocalist Alan Tecchio. Newly signed to Noise Records, Watchtower recorded their second album, Control and Resistance, at Sky Trak Studios in Berlin, Germany, in the summer of 1989. They released the album that November. Control and Resistance mixed progressive metal, thrash metal and jazz fusion, creating an influence on the technical death metal genre. It received positive reviews by press and fans. In support of the album, the band opened for Coroner in Europe on their No More Color tour, and also played with Dark Angel, Loudblast, Tankard, Prong, Fates Warning, Mordred, and Whiplash.

After first and only European tour (opening for Noise Records labelmates Coroner) during the spring of 1990, Watchtower continued to promote Control and Resistance with a few East Coast shows but Tecchio left soon thereafter. The remaining members of the band spent more than two years searching for a new vocalist, which proved to be a difficult task, although several candidates – including Scott Jeffries (Confessor) – were at least considered. Adding to the band's woes, Jarzombek developed severe hand problems which required multiple surgeries, effectively putting Watchtower on ice indefinitely and with it a proposed third album, which was to be titled Mathematics.

=== Split (1993–1999) ===
After failing to find a permanent replacement for vocalist Alan Tecchio, Watchtower officially disbanded around 1993, and the members went on to pursue their own individual activities. Bassist Doug Keyser and drummer Rick Colaluca joined colorful local rock/funk/rap outfit Retarted Elf who released the album Trick Quigger on Pony Canyon in Japan. Jarzombek returned with Spastic Ink, akin to an all-instrumental version of Watchtower, who issued their debut album, Ink Complete in 1997, while McMaster continued with Dangerous Toys before making Broken Teeth his main band in the late 1990s. Tecchio reunited with his former Hades bandmate Dan Lorenzo in the New Jersey-based heavy metal band Non-Fiction, which released three studio albums during the early-to-mid 1990s – about the same time the duo resurrected Hades, who remain active to this day despite no new recordings since their most recent studio album, 2001's DamNation.

=== Reunion with Jason McMaster (1999–2010) ===
In 1999, original Watchtower members McMaster, Keyser and Colaluca reunited, along with Jarzombek, to record a cover of Accept's "Run If You Can" for A Tribute to Accept – Vol. 1 on Nuclear Blast Records. In 2000, Watchtower played the prestigious Bang Your Head!!! festival in Germany and later that summer supported Dream Theater in Houston and Dallas. The band also began work on the long dormant Mathematics album, but progress stalled once again.

In 2002, Monster Records issued Demonstrations in Chaos, an archives release consisting of early recordings, demos, and unreleased tracks, including almost the complete original Energetic Disassembly recordings and the 1987 demos with Ron Jarzombek that got the band signed to Noise Records.

Watchtower returned to Europe once more in 2004 to headline the Headway Festival in Amstelveen, Holland. That same year Ron Jarzombek released the second Spastic Ink album, Ink Compatible, with guest contributions by Watchtower bandmates Doug Keyser and Jason McMaster who contributed lead vocals on five songs. In the fall of 2004, Monster Records, now Monster Underground, reissued Energetic Disassembly on CD for the first time ever in the United States. The original CD reissue came 1993, courtesy of Germany's Institute of Art label.

In the spring of 2009, Watchtower were confirmed as co-headliners of the 13th edition of Germany's Keep It True Festival, set to take place in April 2010. The band also re-commenced work on Mathematics with a view toward a 2010 release.

Decibel Magazine featured Watchtower's Control and Resistance as part of their "Hall of Fame" series in their January 2010 issue.

=== Reunion with Alan Tecchio and Concepts of Math EPs (2010–2022) ===
On April 9, 2010, Watchtower released a preliminary mix of "The Size of Matter" from their forthcoming album Mathematics as a digital-only single. It marked the band's first new music since Control and Resistance in 1989, featuring Jarzombek, Keyser, and Colaluca, with Alan Tecchio returning on vocals and replacing original frontman Jason McMaster for the second time in the band's history. In May 2010, Tecchio left Watchtower once again. After the announcement of Tecchio's departure. Watchtower's last public appearance was at the German Keep It True festival in 2010.

On October 7, 2016, the EP Concepts of Math: Book One was released by Prosthetic Records, featuring previously released tracks, and new track, "Mathematica Calculis". On October 21, Watchtower released three new songs from Mathematics, M-Theory Overture, Arguments Against Design and Technology Inaction, on iTunes and CD Baby. They reunited with Tecchio for the sessions of these tracks.

Nothing has been posted on their Facebook page since 2016 and their official website is currently defunct. Nevertheless, Control and Resistance was reissued by Music On Vinyl in July 2018.

After years of speculation regarding the current status of Watchtower, drummer Rick Colaluca confirmed in a statement on Facebook in July 2020 that the band had been on an indefinite hiatus, and stated it was "doubtful that [they would] ever reform, but not out of the question." Colaluca also revealed that the band had "discussions a few times over the past several years" about finishing their long-in-the works third album Mathematics, and added that "there are a couple of sticking points that we just can't seem to get past. We actually have a good bit of the remaining songs recorded to some degree."

In a May 2022 interview, Tecchio stated that, even though Watchtower was "not like an active band", they had "pretty much the material" for their next EP Concepts of Math: Book Two. He also revealed that he had "one song in particular that [he was] still working on".

=== Second reunion with Jason McMaster (2023–present) ===
After more than two months of teasing a potential reunion, original singer Jason McMaster confirmed in a May 2023 interview on The Decibel Geek podcast that he would be rejoining Watchtower after a thirteen-year absence, and added that the band had been rehearsing for a series of live dates for 2024, including festival appearances.

On June 7, 2023, it was announced that Watchtower would be playing one of its first shows in 13 years, and with McMaster in 19 years, at the Keep It True Rising III festival in Germany on October 7. The band played their first U.S. show in over a decade at Fitzgerald's Bar in San Antonio and followed with an announcement that in March 2024, they would appear at the Hell's Heroes festival at White Oak Music Hall in Houston, alongside such bands as Queensrÿche and Sodom.

In June 2025, McMaster confirmed that new music from Watchtower is in the works.

== Musical style and influences ==
Watchtower performs styles that are considered to be progressive metal and technical thrash. Greg Prato of AllMusic stated the opinion that the band's tracks "often came off as excuses to shred away and show off their member's instrumental prowess." The band initially drew inspiration from Iron Maiden and Rush.

Watchtower has also been cited as having influenced or inspired many notable metal acts, including Testament, Dream Theater, Death, Annihilator, Coroner, Atheist, Pestilence, Cynic, Symphony X, Devin Townsend, Toxik, Sieges Even and Spiral Architect. AllMusic said that the band "did not stay together long enough to reap the benefits of their creativity."

== Members ==
Current members

- Jason McMaster – lead vocals (1982–1988, 1999–2009, 2023–present)
- Ron Jarzombek – guitars (1986–1993, 1999–2010, 2015–2016, 2022–present)
- Doug Keyser – bass (1982–1993, 1999–2010, 2015–2016, 2022–present)
- Rick Colaluca – drums (1982–1993, 1999–2010, 2015–2016, 2022–present)

Former members

- Mike Soliz – lead vocals (1988–1989)
- Alan Tecchio – lead vocals (1989–1990, 2010, 2015–2016, 2022–2023)
- Billy White – guitars (1982–1986)

== Discography ==
=== Studio albums ===
- Energetic Disassembly (Zombo Records, 1985 / Institute of Art, 1993/1997 / Monster Underground 2004 / Rockadrome, 2006)
- Control and Resistance (Noise International, 1989)

=== Compilation albums ===
- Demonstrations in Chaos (Monster Records, 2002 / Rockadrome, 2006)

=== EPs and singles ===
- "The Size of Matter" (digital single, 2010)
- "Arguments Against Design" (digital single, 2015)
- "M-Theory Overture" (digital single, 2015)
- "Technology Inaction" (digital single, 2015)
- Concepts of Math: Book One (Prosthetic Records, 2016)
- Concepts of Math: Book Two (TBA)

=== Demos ===
- Meltdown (1984)
- Demo 1987 (1987)
- Instruments of Random Murder (1987)
