= Charlie Zeleny =

American drummer

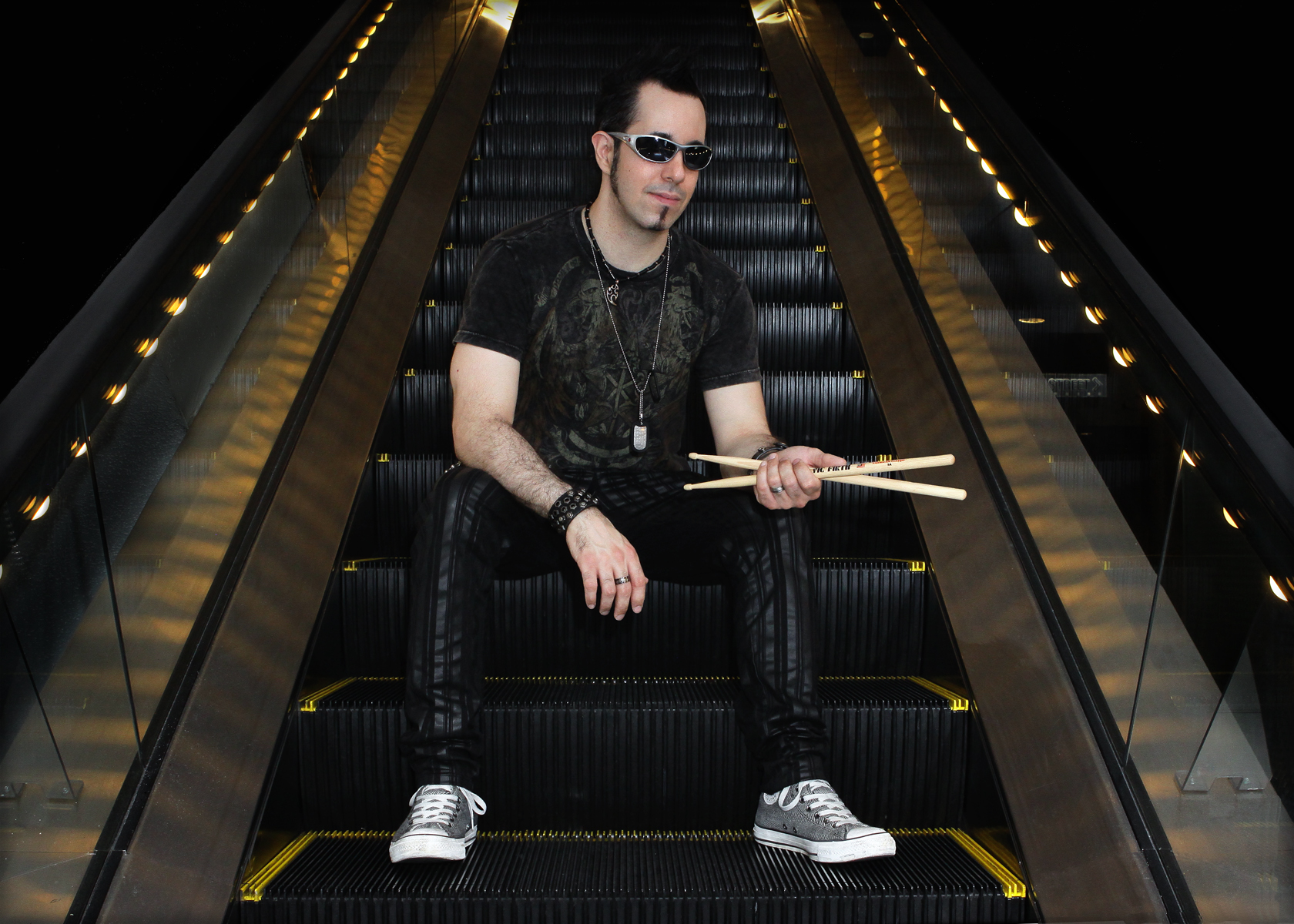

Background information
- Also known as: Charlie Z
- Born: Charles T Zeleny; September 18, 1981 (age 44)
- Genres: Progressive rock, progressive metal, jazz fusion, Death Metal, rock, Heavy Metal, hip hop, EDM
- Occupations: Musician, music director, producer, solo artist
- Instrument: Drums
- Years active: 1995–present
- Member of: Behold... The Arctopus; Blotted Science
- Website: charliezeleny.com

Charlie Zeleny, also known as Charlie Z, is an American session drummer, music director and solo artist. He was also a member of the progressive metal bands Blotted Science and Behold the Arctopus, has played in a duo with keyboardist Jordan Rudess, and has performed drum duets with Terry Bozzio for The Drum Channel. His 2011 video project, Drumageddon Brooklyn, was a one-take, continuously shot 8-minute drum solo with Zeleny performing through an entire building in Brooklyn and ending on the building's rooftop. Zeleny is also known by his solo artist persona "DRMAGDN: Cyborg/Drummer DJ".

== Early life ==
Zeleny was born on 18 September 1981. He began playing drums at the age of 7 in his school concert band and switched to drumset for the school's jazz band when he was 10. He attended Morris Knolls High School in Morris County, New Jersey and then Drew University, where he graduated in 2002 with a major in music performance. While in high school and college, he also studied drumset privately under Tommy Igoe, Nick Scheuble, Joe Bergamini and John Riley. He was accepted at the graduate school of New York University to study jazz drumset performance but he did not attend and decided to pursue a professional career as a musician instead.

== Professional music career ==
According to Zeleny in a 2016 interview, he has played in 43 US states, in 20 countries, and has appeared on over 135 records in the course of his professional career. He is also listed in the Sick Drummer Magazine "Hall of Fame." As a session drummer he plays in a variety of styles including pop, rock, jazz, fusion, progressive metal, hip hop, funk, R&B and electronic music.

Zeleny has performed with keyboardist Jordan Rudess as well as playing drum duets with Terry Bozzio for The Drum Channel. His artist's profile at Pearl Drums lists him as having played or recorded with Euro pop star Gala, hip hop artists Outasight, and XV, and Broadway and Glee star Kristin Chenoweth. Other artists and groups with whom he has played or recorded include Latin pop star Thalía, classic rock artists Joe Lynn Turner, Steve Augeri, and Derek St. Holmes; and the prog and metal bands Suspyre, Kayo Dot, Mythodea, and Anuryzm, as well the classical violinist and guitarist The Great Kat. Among his jazz performances are playing with his Charlie Z Jazz Trio during the 2016 Lucie Awards ceremony at Carnegie Hall's Zankel Hall and with Cracked Latin at the Iridium Jazz Club.

Besides his work as a session drummer, Zeleny was an original member of the groups Behold...The Arctopus and Blotted Science and a later member of Whiplash. He joined Behold...The Arctopus (Colin Marston and Mike Lerner) as their drummer shortly after the duo released their 2002 demo EP We Need A Drummer (the demo had used a drum machine programmed by Marston instead of human drummer). Zeleny remained a member of Arctopus until 2008 when he left to concentrate on his work as a session musician. In 2006, Zeleny had also joined Ron Jarzombek and Alex Webster in their Blotted Science project and was the drummer on their 2007 debut recording The Machinations of Dementia. Between 2014 and 2015, Zeleny was the drummer for the thrash metal band Whiplash. He made his live debut with them in June 2014 at the Dingbatz club in Clifton, New Jersey.

== Music projects ==
In 2006, Zeleny began working with Jordan Rudess's online conservatory to develop the conservatory's drum courses.

Zeleny's video project "Drumageddon" began in 2011. He played a one take, continuously shot 8-minute drum solo called Drumageddon Brooklyn. The solo featured him performing through an entire Brooklyn building on drums placed strategically throughout different rooms, stairwells, elevators with the solo ending on the building's rooftop. He followed up the video with Drumageddon Manhattan performing a one take drum solo similarly all across Times Square NYC and Drumageddon Queens where he battled four other versions of himself in front of the Unisphere Globe, both also shot in one continuous take.

His other projects have included serving as the drummer, bandleader and music director for Cracked Latin, a 13-piece New York City-based Latin band. and leading a group of his fellow session musicians at The Charlie Z All Star Birthday Concert performed at The Bitter End on September 19, 2011.

In 2016, Zeleny produced, was a primary songwriter and played drums for the Bella D CD release The Crystal Ceiling.

Under his solo artist persona "DRMAGDN: Cyborg/Drummer DJ" Zeleny simultaneously plays drums while performing EDM originals and live remixes.

== Discography ==
=== CDs ===
- Behold... The Arctopus - Alcoholocaust Now…Warmaggedeon Later - Epicine Sound System Records - 2004
- Behold... The Arctopus - Nano-Nucleonic Cyborg Summoning EP - Troubleman Unlimited - 2005
- Ken Rubenstein - Invert and Transcend - Inverted Music - 2005
- Behold... The Arctopus - Orthrealm Split - Troubleman Unlimited Records - 2006
- Behold... The Arctopus - Nano-Nucleonic Cyborg Summoning Extended Release LP” - BMA/Metal Blade Records - 2006
- Behold... The Arctopus - Skullgrid - Black Market Activities/Metal Blade Records - 2007
- Blotted Science - The Machinations of Dementia - Eclectic Electric - 2007
- Shannon Corey - Unsaid - Motherwest Records - 2007
- Kayo Dot - Blue Lambency Downward - Hydrahead Records - 2008
- Suspyre - When Time Fades... - Sensory Records - 2008
- Delexilio - Delexilio - KBZA Music - 2009
- Jurgen Blackmore - JR Blackmore & Friends - JR Records - 2011
- Felix Martin - The Scenic Album - Prosthetic Records - 2013
- Tanya Morgan - Rubber Souls - Deep Thinka Records - 2013
- Joel Hoekstra - Dying to Live - Frontiers Records - 2015
- Anuryzm - All Is Not For All - Melodic Revolution Records - 2015
- Alcatrazz - The Ultimate Fortress Rock Set - Store For Music - 2016
- Bella D - The Crystal Ceiling - Drumageddon Productions - 2016
