= Blotted Science =

American instrumental progressive metal supergroup

- Origin: San Antonio, Texas, U.S.
- Genres: Progressive metal, instrumental rock
- Years active: 2005–present
- Label: EclecticElectric
- Members: Ron Jarzombek; Alex Webster; Hannes Grossmann
- Past members: Derek Roddy; Chris Adler; Charlie Zeleny
- Website: www.ronjarzombek.com/BlottedScienceOnline.html

Blotted Science is an instrumental progressive metal supergroup headed by Ron Jarzombek (Watchtower, Spastic Ink), bassist Alex Webster (Cannibal Corpse) and drummer Hannes Grossmann (ex-Obscura, ex-Necrophagist). They formed under the name Machinations of Dementia, but later changed their name to Blotted Science (Machinations of Dementia would be the title of their first publicly purchasable album).

== History ==
In 2005 Ron Jarzombek contacted drummer Chris Adler (ex-Lamb of God) and bassist Alex Webster (Cannibal Corpse) about a possible collaboration, with the goal of taking Jarzombek's signature left-of-center progressive metal approach into a much heavier, more extreme realm. Although the addition of a vocalist was briefly considered, the trio ultimately decided to remain an all-instrumental band. However, Adler had to leave the project due to his demanding schedule with Lamb of God. Still, he would collaborate with Jarzombek on the song "The Near Dominance of 4 Against 5", which appeared on Magna Carta's Drum Nation Vol. 3 compilation in 2006.

Adler's replacement was Derek Roddy (Hate Eternal, Nile) and, at the suggestion of Webster, the band took on the name Machinations of Dementia. Roddy left the group in August 2006. Shortly thereafter, Jarzombek was introduced to Charlie Zeleny, who would provide the missing drum tracks in a matter of weeks. The band, now known as Blotted Science, released their debut album, The Machinations of Dementia, in the fall of 2007 on Jarzombek's EclecticElectric label. The album was also licensed to Marquee/Avalon for the territory of Japan where it was released on June 22, 2011.

In September 2010, Ron Jarzombek announced plans for a new Blotted Science EP consisting of seven songs totaling 24 minutes of music, with a tentative release date of early 2011. He also confirmed that the band would be utilizing the services of German drummer Hannes Grossmann in place of Zeleny on the recording. Grossmann and Jarzombek also collaborated in the one-off project Terrestrial Exiled whose digital only single 'Duodecimal Levorotation' was released in May 2011.

In late July 2011, a two-minute video teaser was posted on the band's YouTube channel and an October 4, 2011 release date announced for the EP, titled The Animation of Entomology. The band signed a license deal with UK-based Basick Records for the territory of Europe where the EP was released on November 28, 2011.

In late April 2013, it was announced that both Blotted Science titles were scheduled for limited edition release on vinyl via Florida-based Antithetic Records with a release date of May 21, 2013.

== Members ==
=== Current members ===
- Ron Jarzombek – guitars (2005–present)
- Alex Webster – bass (2005–present)
- Hannes Grossmann – drums (2011–present)

=== Former members ===
- Chris Adler – drums (2005–2006)
- Derek Roddy – drums (2006)
- Charlie Zeleny – drums (2006–2011)

Timeline

== Discography ==
- The Machinations of Dementia (2007)
- The Animation of Entomology EP (2011)
