= Mike Lerner (musician) =

- Also known as: Direwolf
- Born: May 17, 1981 (age 43)
- Genres: Extreme metal, black metal
- Instrument: Guitar
- Years active: 2001-present
- Labels: Black Market Activities

Mike Lerner is an American metal guitarist best known for his work with Behold... The Arctopus.

== Career ==
Lerner began playing the piano when he was five years old. He attended New York University where he received a degree and met fellow musician Colin Marston. The two began to play together and eventually formed the tech-metal group Behold... the Arctopus. They were later joined by drummer Charlie Zeleny.

== Equipment ==
Lerner is endorsed by Ibanez Guitars and is often seen performing on their RG model. His first Ibanez guitar was a bright yellow coloured RG565 that he found at a pawn shop in the mid-1990s. He also uses a Peavey 5150 head and a Mesa Boogie 4x12 cabinet.

== Discography ==
=== With Behold... The Arctopus ===
- 2002: We Need a Drummer (demo, MP3.com)
- 2003: Arctopocalypse Now... Warmageddon Later (demo, self-released)
- 2005: Nano-Nucleonic Cyborg Summoning (EP, Troubleman Unlimited, Epicene Sound Systems)
- 2006: Split with Orthrelm (Split, Crucial Blast Records, Eyes of Sound)
- 2007: Memphis 3-6-06 (Video, s.l.a.p.)
- 2007: Skullgrid (album, Black Market Activities)
- 2012: Horrorscension (album, Black Market Activities)
- 2016: Cognitive Emancipation (album)
- 2020: Hapeleptic Overtrove (album, Willowtip Records)

=== As Direwolf ===
- 2007: Beyond the Lands of Human Existence (album, Blastard Entertainment)

=== Other appearances ===
- 2006: Astomatous - The Beauty Of Reason
  - Performed guitar on the track "The Ascetic Ponders"

== See also ==
- Colin Marston
- Black Market Activities
