= Dissonance Theory (album) =

Studio album by Coroner
- Released: 17 October 2025
- Recorded: 2022–2025
- Genres: Progressive metal, technical thrash metal, groove metal
- Length: 47:20
- Label: Century Media
- Producer: Tommy Vetterli

Coroner chronology
The Unknown Unreleased Tracks 1985–95 (1996)	Dissonance Theory (2025)

Coroner studio album chronology
Grin (1993)	Dissonance Theory (2025)

Singles from Dissonance Theory
- 1. "Renewal" Released: 15 August 2025; 2. "Symmetry" Released: 17 September 2025

Dissonance Theory is the sixth studio album by the Swiss thrash metal band Coroner, released on 17 October 2025 through Century Media Records. It is the band's first studio album since Grin (1993), and their first release with drummer Diego Rappachietti, who replaced original drummer Marky Edelmann in 2014.

== Background and production ==
After disbanding in 1996, Coroner announced in 2010 that they were reuniting for a series of festival appearances, including the following year's installments of Maryland Deathfest, Hellfest, and Bloodstock Open Air. Although guitarist Tommy Vetterli had stated that new music from Coroner was a possibility, he said that both vocalist and bassist Ron Broder and drummer Marky Edelmann had no interest in making a new album. On 12 February 2014, Edelmann announced that he would be leaving the band at the end of the month, citing a disinterest in new material, as opposed to Broder and Vetterli; he was replaced three months later by Diego Rapacchietti.

In a June 2014 interview with Andrew Haug, Vetterli spoke about the possibility of a new album, saying, "I can't say when [a new studio album might arrive]. It's just what we want. But everybody's very busy, you know — me producing bands in the studio all the time... If we do something, it has to be very good." In the following year, Broder stated that the band had individually been in the process of collecting songwriting ideas and was hopeful that they would enter the studio in 2016 to begin recording a sixth studio album.

Progress on a sixth studio album from Coroner had been slow for years, due to the band members taking their time on writing and recording new material without having to rush it. On 26 July 2016, the band announced that they had entered the studio to begin recording their new album, which was initially set for release in 2017; however, the album never arrived in 2017 and there had been no news about the album until April 2020, when Coroner announced via Twitter that they were "going to record a NEW album this year." In a May 2021 interview with Agoraphobic News, Edelmann (who has remained in contact with his former bandmates since leaving Coroner) stated that the band was planning to "finally go to the studio this fall" to work on their new album. In a May 2022 interview with 69 Faces of Rock, Vetterli said, "We've actually started the recording, we have started recording drums, six songs are recorded and two more songs are ready, but Ron's part is missing and then we have to write another one, and then we hit the studio and record it."

Coroner released their first song in more than three decades, "Renewal", on 15 August 2025 and announced on the same day that their sixth studio album Dissonance Theory would be released on 17 October.

== Track listing ==
Dissonance Theory track listing
No.	Title	Lyrics	Music	Length
1.	"Oxymoron"	Instrumental	Tommy Vetterli; Dennis Russ; Mirijam Skal	0:59
2.	"Consequence"	Kriscinda Lee Everitt; Russ	Vetterli; Russ	6:15
3.	"Sacrificial Lamb"	Everitt	Vetterli; Russ	6:03
4.	"Crisium Bound"	Russ	Vetterli; Russ	5:30
5.	"Symmetry"	Russ	Vetterli	3:58
6.	"The Law"	Everitt; Russ	Vetterli; Russ	5:01
7.	"Transparent Eye"	Everitt	Vetterli; Russ	5:16
8.	"Trinity"	Everitt	Vetterli; Russ	5:42
9.	"Renewal"	Everitt; Russ	Vetterli; Russ	5:22
10.	"Prolonging"	Instrumental	Vetterli; Russ; Skal	3:14
Total length:				47:20

== Personnel ==
Credits adapted from Tidal.

=== Coroner ===
- Ron Broder – bass guitar (all tracks), lead vocals (tracks 2–9)
- Tommy Vetterli – guitars, production, engineering
- Diego Rapacchietti – drums

=== Additional contributors ===
- Dennis Russ – co-production, keyboards (all tracks); background vocals (2–9)
- Jens Bogren – mixing, mastering
- Mirijam Skal – sound effects (2, 10)

== Charts ==
Chart performance for Dissonance Theory
Chart (2025–2026)	Peak position
Austrian Albums (Ö3 Austria)	14
Belgian Albums (Ultratop Flanders)	164
Belgian Albums (Ultratop Wallonia)	70
French Albums (SNEP)	63
French Rock & Metal Albums (SNEP)	6
German Rock & Metal Albums (Offizielle Top 100)	12
Japanese Rock Albums (Oricon)	16
Japanese Western Albums (Oricon)	29
Norwegian Physical Albums (IFPI Norge)	5
Polish Albums (ZPAV)	52
Scottish Albums (Official Charts)	54
Swedish Hard Rock Albums (Sverigetopplistan)	20
Swedish Physical Albums (Sverigetopplistan)	11
Swiss Albums (Schweizer Hitparade)	4
UK Albums Sales (OCC)	56
UK Rock & Metal Albums (Official Charts)	10
