= Asristir Vieldriox =

EP by Orthrelm
- Released: February 5, 2002
- Genre: Abstract, grindcore, experimental rock, avantgarde
- Label: Troubleman Unlimited Records

Orthrelm chronology
Norildivoth Crallos-Lomrixth Urthiln (2002)	Asristir Vieldriox (2002)	OV (2005)

Asristir Vieldriox (sometimes spelt Asristirveildrioxe) is an EP released by the avantgarde band Orthrelm. It was released by Troubleman Unlimited Records in February 2002. Despite having 99 tracks on it (the maximum any CD can hold), each one is only 5 to 15 seconds in length, therefore making the entire release only 13 minutes long in total. Due to this it cannot be classed as an album but an EP instead.

Each track mainly consists of quick and abrasive guitar lines with corresponding drum parts. There are no vocals.

The style of this EP is best described as Abstract, Grindcore, Experimental and Avantgarde.

== Reception ==
Professional ratings
Review scores
Source	Rating
AllMusic	3/5 stars

In a review for AllMusic, William York wrote: "this is constantly jarring, nerve-rattling stuff. In fact, due to the extreme compositional density and compression of this music, one is tempted afterwards to throw on some Anton Webern or early Napalm Death -- two infamous champions of brevity -- just to decompress a little bit." He recommended the album for "curiosity seekers and for die-hard fans interested in examining the duo's music at its most microscopic level."

Alec Hanley Bemis of LA Weekly stated: "You get 99 songs in 12 minutes. This prolific drum/guitar duo exists at the nexus of prog-rock, free jazz and extreme metal. Mick Barr's guitar tangles are so dense, he makes the Locust's Bobby Bray sound like James Taylor."

A writer for Indy Week described the album as "acid spittle; fleeting metal riffs slapped against a clatter of drums, rolling into big, brittle space."

== Track timings ==
As each of the tracks are not named, it is not possible to give a track listing however the following list shows how long in minutes and seconds how long each track is.

1. 0:05
2. 0:06
3. 0:05
4. 0:13
5. 0:06
6. 0:05
7. 0:04
8. 0:05
9. 0:06
10. 0:04
11. 0:09
12. 0:06
13. 0:04
14. 0:04
15. 0:04
16. 0:05
17. 0:05
18. 0:08
19. 0:04
20. 0:05
21. 0:04
22. 0:04
23. 0:04
24. 0:04
25. 0:08
26. 0:07
27. 0:05
28. 0:05
29. 0:06
30. 0:05
31. 0:06
32. 0:09
33. 0:05
34. 0:05
35. 0:05
36. 0:07
37. 0:09
38. 0:05
39. 0:07
40. 0:08
41. 0:05
42. 0:05
43. 0:08
44. 0:08
45. 0:08
46. 0:06
47. 0:06
48. 0:07
49. 0:05
50. 0:07
51. 0:09
52. 0:07
53. 0:08
54. 0:06
55. 0:12
56. 0:06
57. 0:05
58. 0:08
59. 0:07
60. 0:05
61. 0:12
62. 0:08
63. 0:06
64. 0:06
65. 0:04
66. 0:14
67. 0:08
68. 0:06
69. 0:09
70. 0:11
71. 0:11
72. 0:04
73. 0:07
74. 0:10
75. 0:05
76. 0:07
77. 0:07
78. 0:10
79. 0:12
80. 0:06
81. 0:06
82. 0:10
83. 0:09
84. 0:08
85. 0:06
86. 0:11
87. 0:10
88. 0:09
89. 0:07
90. 0:09
91. 0:05
92. 0:13
93. 0:09
94. 0:11
95. 0:08
96. 0:04
97. 0:13
98. 0:14
99. 0:27
