= Cognitive Emancipation =

Studio album by Behold... The Arctopus
- Released: November 08, 2016
- Recorded: July 2016
- Studio: Menegroth, The Thousand Caves
- Genre: Progressive metal Technical death metal
- Length: 19:19

Behold... The Arctopus chronology
Horrorscension (2012)	Cognitive Emancipation (2016)

Cognitive Emancipation is the third studio album by Behold... The Arctopus, released in 2016. This is the first album to feature current drummer Jason Bauers after the departure of previous drummer Weasel Walter.

== Track listing ==
No.	Title	Length
1.	"Obnoxiousing in Irritation"	2:21
2.	"Exasperating the Idiotic"	3:06
3.	"Resummon the Unreaching"	6:44
4.	"Cognitive Emancipation"	7:07
Total length:		19:19

== Personnel ==
- Colin Marston – Warr Guitar, recording, mastering, mixing
- Mike Lerner – electric guitar, guitar solos
- Jason Bauers – drums
