= Ink Compatible =

Studio album by Spastic Ink
- Released: March 21, 2004 (US and Europe); April 21, 2004 (Japan and Southeast Asia)
- Recorded: 2000–2004
- Genre: Progressive metal
- Length: 58:10
- Label: EclecticElectric; Avalon/Marquee; Iron d
- Producer: Ron Jarzombek

Spastic Ink chronology
Ink Complete (1997)	Ink Compatible (2004)

Ink Compatible is the second full-length album from Spastic Ink. It was released in 2004 after a four-year process via Ron Jarzombek's EclecticElectric label, except for Japan and Southeast Asia where it was released by Avalon/Marquee. It was released in Russia on Iron d.

An alternate version of the Japanese bonus track, A Quick Affix, can be found as Peppered Cancer on Bobby Jarzombek's instructional drum DVD, Performance & Technique.

== Track listing ==
1. "Aquanet" – 8:10
2. "Just a Little Bit" – 4:42
3. "Words for Nerds" – 5:22
4. "Melissa's Friend" – 7:08
5. "Read Me" – 4:16
6. "Multi-Masking" – 8:11
7. "In Memory of..." – 6:50
8. "A Chaotic Realization of Nothing Yet Misunderstood" – 12:11
9. "The Cereal Mouse" – 1:20
10. "A Quick Affix" (Japanese Bonus Track) – 4:40

All music by Ron Jarzombek, except 10 by Bobby Jarzombek & Ron Jarzombek. All lyrics by Ron Jarzombek.

== Personnel ==
- Jason McMaster - vocals (1,2,6,7,8)
- Ron Jarzombek - guitar (all); programming (3,4,5,6,8,9,10); voice (3)
- Pete Perez - bass (1,2,4,6,9)
- Bobby Jarzombek - drums (1,2,4,6,7,9,10)

=== Guest musicians ===
- Daniel Gildenlöw (Pain of Salvation) - vocals (4)
- Marty Friedman (ex-Megadeth) - guitar solo (8 at 3:04)
- Doug Keyser (Watchtower) - bass (5,8)
- Michael Manring - fretless bass solo (3)
- Sean Malone (Cynic, Gordian Knot) - bass (7)
- Ray Riendeau (Halford, Machines of Loving Grace) - bass (3)
- Jens Johansson (Stratovarius, ex-Yngwie Malmsteen) - synth solo (1 at 5:27; 5)
- Jimmy Pitts - synth solo (5 at 4:25)
- David Bagsby - synth solo (3)
- David Penna - drums (3,5)
- Jeff Eber (Dysrhythmia) - drums (8)
