= Control and Resistance =

Studio album by Watchtower
- Released: November 6, 1989
- Recorded: August 1989
- Studios: SkyTrak Studio, Berlin, Germany
- Genres: Progressive metal; technical thrash metal; jazz fusion
- Length: 43:15
- Label: Noise
- Producer: Watchtower

Watchtower chronology
Energetic Disassembly (1985)	Control and Resistance (1989)	Demonstrations in Chaos (2002)

Control and Resistance is the second and final album by progressive metal band Watchtower, released in 1989. This was the band's last album before disbanding in 1993 while working on its never-released third album Mathematics, and their first release with vocalist Alan Tecchio and guitarist Ron Jarzombek. Control and Resistance combines elements of thrash metal, progressive metal and jazz fusion, and has been cited as one of the most influential albums in the technical thrash metal genre, as well as a major influence on the then-emerging technical death metal scene.

== Music ==
Loudwire said the album was stylistically a "blend of progressive instrumentation and classic metal vigor". The album contains harmonized guitar solos and elements of jazz. Influence from bands such as Rush, Queensrÿche and Metallica are apparent on the album. According to Robert Taylor of AllMusic, Watchtower's sound was created by fusing the "most extreme elements" of these influences. Taylor described the album as "a series of complex, dark, and heavy songs." Lead singer Alan Tecchio sings in the falsetto vocal register, which Taylor said sounds "dated". Taylor also noted the influence of jazz guitarist Allan Holdsworth in the guitar work of Ron Jarzombek.Lyrically, the tracks address socio-political issues, system control, and philosophical themes.

== Reception ==
Professional ratings
Review scores
Source	Rating
Allmusic	4/5 stars

Control and Resistance was hailed by Guitar World magazine as one of "The Top Ten Shred Albums of the 80's" in a retrospective feature, "Sounding like the twisted scion of Metallica and the Mahavishnu Orchestra, Watchtower was the most brilliant weird band of its time. Guitarist Ron Jarzombek, with his complex harmony solos, strange scales and furious staccato lead bursts, performs tricks on his guitar that will leave you more than sufficiently breathless."

== Track listing ==
1. "Instruments of Random Murder" – 4:06
2. "The Eldritch" – 3:17
3. "Mayday in Kiev" – 5:48
4. "The Fall of Reason" – 8:01
5. "Control and Resistance" – 6:58
6. "Hidden Instincts" – 3:51
7. "Life Cycles" – 6:48
8. "Dangerous Toy" – 4:20

tracks 1, 2, 4 & 5 written by Billy White and Doug Keyser
tracks 3, 6, 7 & 8 written by Doug Keyser and Ron Jarzombek

== Notes ==
- The vinyl and compact disc versions of the album each feature distinctly different front cover artwork.
- "Instruments of Random Murder" and "The Eldritch" were previously demoed in early 1987 at Cedar Creek Studios in Austin, TX. It was the first ever recording with Ron Jarzombek on guitar.
- "The Fall of Reason" and "Hidden Instincts" were previously demoed by the band on a 4-track recorder in the fall of 1987.
- Both 1987 demos are contained on the 2002 archives release Demonstrations In Chaos.
- The original working title for "Hidden Instincts" was "Plastic Lasagna".
- "Dangerous Toy" was previously recorded with Mike Soliz on vocals for the 1989 Doomsday News 2 compilation.

== Band line-up ==
- Alan Tecchio - vocals
- Ron Jarzombek - guitars
- Doug Keyser - bass
- Rick Colaluca - drums
