= Nano-Nucleonic Cyborg Summoning =

- Original issue

EP by Behold... The Arctopus
- Released: March 8, 2005
- Genre: Technical death metal
- Length: 17:31; 53:00 (re-issue)
- Label: Troubleman Unlimited; Epicene Sound Systems (12" screen-printed white vinyl); Black Market Activities (re-issue)
- Producer: Colin Marston

Behold... The Arctopus chronology
Arctopocalypse Now... Warmageddon Later (2003)	Nano-Nucleonic Cyborg Summoning (2005)	Orthrelm/Behold... The Arctopus (2006)

Expanded edition
- Re-issue

Professional ratings
Review scores
Source	Rating
About.com	2/5 stars
Allmusic	3.5/5 stars

Nano-Nucleonic Cyborg Summoning is the second EP album by Behold... the Arctopus, released in 2005 on Epicene Sound Systems and limited to 800 copies. It was later released on 12" screen-printed white vinyl limited to 500 copies.

Black Market Activities reissued this EP on August 22, 2006. It contains all of Nano-Nucleonic Cyborg Summoning and Arctopocalypse Now... Warmageddon Later, plus selected live tracks. The cover art was illustrated by Terry Grow.

== Track listing ==
1. "Exospacial Psionic Aura" – 7:38
2. "Estrogen/Pathogen Exchange Program" – 5:19
3. "Sensory Amusia" – 4:34

=== Re-release ===
1. "Exospacial Psionic Aura" – 7:31
2. "Estrogen/Pathogen Exchange Program" – 5:26
3. "Sensory Amusia" – 4:39
4. "Alcoholocaust" – 2:50
5. "You Will Be Reincarnated as an Imperial Attack Spaceturtle" – 8:27
6. "Alcoholocaust" (live) – 3:01
7. "You Will Be Reincarnated as an Imperial Attack Spaceturtle" (live) – 8:38
8. "Exospacial Psionic Aura" (live) – 7:16
9. "Sensory Amusia" (live) – 5:14

== Personnel ==
- Colin Marston – warr guitar
- Mike Lerner – electric guitar
- Charlie Zeleny – drums
