= OV (album) =

Studio album by Orthrelm
- Released: 2005
- Recorded: 2004
- Genre: Avant-garde, Experimental
- Length: 45:43
- Label: Ipecac; IPC 64

Orthrelm chronology
Asristir Vieldriox (2002)	OV (2005)	O-3 (2007)

OV is an album by the experimental duo Orthrelm featuring guitarist Mick Barr and drummer Josh Blair. The band's second LP-length release, it was recorded in 2004, and was issued in 2005 by Ipecac Recordings. The album consists of a single, 46-minute track titled "OV".

The work was debuted during live shows two years before being recorded. Regarding its origins, Blair recalled: "I came up with simple patterns, things that were almost symmetrical but not exactly... I crawled inside them to see what could come out of them." He described performances as "mentally and physically draining," and noted: "we focus on keeping the energy up through repetitive sections and thinking about the whole flow of the song."

== Reception ==
Professional ratings
Review scores
Source	Rating
AllMusic	3.5/5 stars
Pitchfork	8.5/10 stars
Tiny Mix Tapes	4/5 stars

In a review for AllMusic, Greg Prato wrote: "Few albums will ever test your endurance like Orthrelm's OV. No vocals, no bass, just intense -- really intense -- repetition... The average listener probably won't be able to sit through the whole shebang, but if you do, you should be awarded a prize of some sort."

Pitchfork's Dominique Leone called the album "a towering achievement," and stated: "OV is both a blueprint and the final result of a pretty amazing idea: hardcore minimalism in a rock context... it is the attention to detail... that makes OV more than just an impressive technical feat... Orthrelm somehow makes music more than the sum of its innumerable parts."

Keith Kawaii of Tiny Mix Tapes noted that the band's "aesthetic blends seamlessly here, seeming at once nihilistic and studious," and remarked: "If anything, Orthrelm make one thing clear: Terry Riley and La Monte Young's shadow still looms over music in 2005, but so does Yngwie Malmsteen's. Check it out."

A writer for Indy Week commented: "Whereas earlier Orthrelm proclaimed, 'Hey, look at this!' OV just is. It's an exorcism of sound that, somehow, sounds entirely non-contrived... It is... a 45-minute paean to imagination, carefully constructed, subtleties guarded and maintained. It is an intimidating piece of music... OV mandates some kind of anxious serenity, a type of restless restfulness where one gets lost in the present and the way it connects to the past, but always fears a potential disconnect in the possibility of the future."

In an article for CMJ New Music Report, Christopher R. Weingarten called the album "easily the best rock update of 20th century composition since the heyday of Glenn Branca," and stated: "No other 'metal' record this year will inspire more thoughts on how rack toms are tuned, how overtones come out in a mix and how a millisecond can affect a downbeat."

Chris Dalen of the Miami New Times commented: "OV is either a monolithic masterpiece or as numbing as five spin cycles in a washing machine... if you can take it, the urgent pace and the explosive climax are exhilarating; like the best extended works, it makes the listener as sweaty as the players."

Writing for The Fader, Matthew Schnipper called OV "essentially braided bits of small repetitions, like an earthworm re-growing itself. But if it grew back in different colors, some shades apart but others from other spectrums entirely, all textured and designed from the same house, but adorned with various, glorious colors."

Exclaim!'s Cam Lindsay remarked: "OV isn't merely some extremely long jam session that doesn't know when to quit; it is an extended piece that works in bursts of repetition. There are changes aplenty throughout its life and even though it appears to rely quite heavily on improvisation, Barr and Blair are so frighteningly in sync their chemistry will scare you more than the destructive nature of the music itself."

Andrew Miller of The Stranger noted: "While there are no melodies to grasp, patterns start sticking in listeners' minds after a few listens, like anchors tossed from the window of a speeding train scraping a spark-lined path in solid cement before finally taking hold," and remarked: "With its dauntingly labyrinthine polyrhythms and shredding solos, Orthrelm play with the sort of technical fervor that makes other musicians either double their practice time or permanently stash their instruments in the closet."

== Track listing ==
1. "OV" – 45:43

== Personnel ==
- Mick Barr – guitar
- Josh Blair – drums
