= Demonstrations in Chaos =

Compilation album by Watchtower
- Released: July 31, 2002
- Recorded: 1983–1987
- Genres: Progressive metal; technical thrash metal
- Length: 75:49
- Labels: Rockadrome; Monster

Watchtower chronology
Control and Resistance (1989)	Demonstrations in Chaos (2002)	Concepts of Math: Book One (2016)

Professional ratings
Review scores
Source	Rating
Allmusic	4/5 stars

Demonstrations in Chaos is a 2002 archives release by progressive metal band Watchtower, containing various early recordings that span the years 1983 to 1987.

The first 7 songs on the album were recorded in the summer of 1983 for the intended original version of Energetic Disassembly; it was scrapped when B.O.S.S. (short for Bob O'Neill Sound Studios) and its label, Rainforest Records, went under. All 7 tracks, plus "Violent Change", were re-cut for the 1985 Zombo Records release.

== Track listing ==
1. "Meltdown" - 4:03
2. "Asylum" - 4:00
3. "Argonne Forest" - 4:52
4. "Social Fears" - 4:43
5. "Tyrants in Distress" - 6:00
6. "Energetic Disassembly" - 5:21
7. "Cimmerian Shadows" - 6:44
8. "The Eldritch" (demo version) - 3:10
9. "Instruments of Random Murder" (demo version) - 3:50
10. "Hidden Instincts" (demo version) - 4:43
11. "The Fall of Reason" (demo version) - 6:55
12. "Control and Resistance" - 7:02
13. "Cathode Ray Window" - 6:06
14. "Ballad Assassin" (live) - 4:12
15. "Meltdown" ('Cottage Cheese From the Lips of Death' version) - 3:58

All songs composed by Doug Keyser and Billy White; except 10. "Hidden Instincts", which is composed by Ron Jarzombek and Doug Keyser, and 14. "Ballad Assassin", which is composed by Watchtower.

== Band line-up ==
- Jason McMaster - vocals
- Billy White - guitars (tracks 1–7; 12–15)
- Ron Jarzombek - guitars (tracks 8–11)
- Doug Keyser - bass
- Rick Colaluca - drums
