= Norildivoth Crallos-Lomrixth Urthiln =

Studio album by Orthrelm
- Released: 2002
- Recorded: 2001
- Studios: Hebron, Maryland
- Genres: Avant-garde, Experimental
- Length: 27:57
- Labels: Three One G 26

Orthrelm chronology
Orthrelm II (2001)	Norildivoth Crallos-Lomrixth Urthiln (2002)	Asristir Vieldriox (2002)

Norildivoth Crallos-Lomrixth Urthiln (also referred to as 2nd 18/O4 Norildivoth Crallos-Lomrixth Urthiln) is an album by the experimental duo Orthrelm featuring guitarist Mick Barr and drummer Josh Blair. The band's first LP-length release, it was recorded in 2001, and was issued in 2002 by Three One G.

== Reception ==
Professional ratings
Review scores
Source	Rating
AllMusic	3.5/5 stars

In a review for AllMusic, Stewart Mason wrote: "there are elements of death metal in Mick Barr's ultra-shred guitar style and Josh Blair's neck-snapping tempos, but there's at least as much Sonny Sharrock and John Bonham, among other influences you wouldn't expect... This is a true rarity, an album that fans of Slayer, King Crimson and Eugene Chadbourne should be able to get into about equally."

In a year-end review of 2002's best releases, Brent Burton of the Washington City Paper commented: "In a good-to-great year of hard rockin' art-tweakage..., Orthrelm earns the top-10 nod for having the least comprehensible worldview. The D.C. instrumental duo's oeuvre all but defenestrates pop tradition in favor of constantly shifting streams of simultaneous guitar and drum solos."

Author Adam Gnade stated that the album "is like if you took a band and chopped it up into tiny pieces with a chef's knife then glued it back together without any sense of design or a bit of aesthetic intention. Which sounds terrible, but it works. It's this wild, galloping, shuddering, formless-yet-precise speed-shred thing that is impossible to explain in words."

A writer for Cleveland Scene remarked: "If Derek Bailey were crossed with Yngwie Malmsteen, the result would be Orthrelm's Mick Barr. What he does, most would never think to attempt."

Writer Phil Freeman of Perfect Sound Forever selected the album as one of his favorite releases of 2002.

== Track listing ==
Norildivoth

1. "Aonkrit Iom-Spear" – 1:52
2. "Chriosainqueilltor" – 1:38
3. "Draoxaimm Lef Lan Growm" – 0:39
4. "Norriill-Divotr" – 1:04
5. "Gharaail Ist" – 0:54
6. "Cylryx-Agfolr" – 0:28
7. "Optixun Straal" – 0:52
8. "Allmuniektea" – 0:48

Crallos-Lomrixth

1. "Scelxenak" – 1:12
2. "Satrilvoithal" – 0:50
3. "Altronate-Varl Viis" – 0:45
4. "Hixor Sparrill Monce" – 0:39

––––––

1. "2nd 13" – 1:35
2. "2nd 14" – 2:21

Urthiln

1. "Urthiln" – 12:20

== Personnel ==
- Mick Barr – guitar
- Josh Blair – drums
