= Suspyre =

American progressive metal band

- Origin: Flemington, New Jersey, United States
- Genres: Progressive metal, symphonic metal, jazz fusion, progressive rock
- Years active: 2001–present
- Labels: Nightmare Records, Sensory Records
- Members: Clay Barton; Andrew Distabile; April Sese; Gabe Marshall; Sam Bhoot; Gregg Rossetti
- Past members: Raffaele Gerace; Kirk Schwenkler; Chris Myers; Sam Paulicelli; Rich Skibinsky

Suspyre is an American progressive metal band from New Jersey, United States, who were formed in 2001.

== About the band ==
Suspyre's sound is heavily influenced by a wide variety of bands and composers, most prominently Dream Theater, Opeth, Symphony X, Mahler, Stravinsky, Mozart and Bach.

In the summer of 2001 drummer Chris Myers hosted a jam session at his house with guitarists Gregg Rossetti and Rich Skibinsky. Kevin O'Hara, a singer whose musical interests are as varied as The Backstreet Boys and medieval music, was asked to be the singer. His debut performance was a metal version of "The Star-Spangled Banner," America's National Anthem. Gregg left for college in August of that year, while Rich and Chris were still in high school.

When Suspyre started working on their first album, it was apparent that the direction of the music was beyond the capabilities of some of the members, and to realize the vision, changes were necessary. First, Chris Myers was replaced by Sam Paulicelli, then Raffaele Gerace was replaced by Clay Barton.

Their debut record, "The Silvery Image" was released in October 2005. Twelve tracks, with a total run time of 56:36, the album has elements of progressive rock, power metal, and classical music. The music showcases many different styles, including featuring a saxophone in select songs. The album was re-mastered and reissued in February 2008, with a new song called "Crimson Shade", written in February, 2004 predating the recording of "The Silvery Image."

Response to that initial album was strong. To follow that, the band sought to maintain the momentum on the next record, "A Great Divide". The first half, The Alignment of Galaxies was composed in August 2005, while The Silvery Image was still in its final stages of completion. The second half, The Origin of a Curse was composed in November 2005, when the band decided a full-length was a better idea than just releasing the first half as an EP. During this time Suspyre parted with bassist Kirk Schwenkler. Noah Martin from Atlanta, Georgia was hired to record the album. The permanent replacement for Kirk is now Andrew Distabile, a friend of the band whom actually switched from guitar to bass in order to play.

=== 2007 ===
"A Great Divide" was released on March 20, 2007 through Nightmare Records, Suspyre's first release on that label. The album release was delayed because of trouble getting the album art. This effort was more diverse in every sense of the word: long, complicated passages are offset by simpler and shorter pieces; straightforward rhythms super-imposed with odd time meters; and the use of microtonal clusters. The album reached the top 2007 prog metal album charts on websites such as USA Progressive Music, ProgPalaceRadio.com, and Beyond Ear Candy. To help promote the album, Suspyre participated in the Chicago PowerFest 2007, in Mokena, Illinois. After the Chicago Powerfest performance, Sam Paulicelli left the band to pursue other opportunities, eventually joining the black metal band, Abigail Williams.

=== 2008 ===
The band finished recording their third album, When Time Fades..., released on Sensory Records on September 30, 2008. Suspyre played with Odin's Court and Dark Empire for two east coast shows the first weekend of August. On August 2, 2008, they announced that April Sese joined the band as their new keyboardist.

Suspyre put on a CD release Performance/Party with special guest drummer Charlie Zeleny on September 20, 2008 to promote the new album, and traveled to the Netherlands for the ProgPower Europe festival in October 2008 with Zeleny as well.

=== 2009 ===
In January 2009, co-founder/guitarist Rich Skibinsky left the band to pursue other opportunities, later joining the punk rock band Kelsey & The Chaos. In February 2009, Suspyre announced a new drummer, Gabe Marshall.

In June 2009, bassist Andrew Distabile replaced Skibinsky on guitar. Sam Bhoot joined the band on bass for their debut performance at The Art of Prog Series at the North Star Bar in Philadelphia on July 26, 2009, and the ProgPower USA showcase in Atlanta, GA on September 10, 2009.

== Members ==
=== Current members ===
- Gregg Rossetti: Guitar, MIDI sequencing, Alto/Tenor saxophone, Viola da Gamba, Chapman stick
- Clay Barton: Vocals
- Andrew Distabile: Guitar
- Sam Bhoot: Bass
- April Sese: Keyboards
- Gabe Marshall: drums

=== Past members ===
- Rich Skibinsky: Guitars
- Raffaele Gerace: Vocals
- Kirk Schwenkler: Bass
- Chris Myers: Drums
- Sam Paulicelli: Drums and percussion

== Albums ==
- The Silvery Image (2005)
- A Great Divide (2007)
- When Time Fades... (2008)
- Suspyre (2012)
