= Skullgrid =

Studio album by Behold... The Arctopus
- Released: October 16, 2007 (CD); November 2007 (vinyl)
- Genre: Technical death metal, instrumental metal
- Length: 33:36
- Label: Black Market Activities

Behold... The Arctopus chronology
Orthrelm/Behold... The Arctopus (2006)	Skullgrid (2007)	Horrorscension (2012)

Professional ratings
Review scores
Source	Rating
Allmusic	4/5 stars
The Apparatus	9.5/10 stars

Skullgrid is the first full-length studio album by Behold... The Arctopus, released in 2007 on Black Market Activities. It contains seven studio recordings of previously unreleased original compositions.

The album was released on CD and two different versions of vinyl. The first version was a red/black splattered vinyl colour limited to 300 copies and the second was a white/red splattered vinyl colour limited to 200 copies. Both versions of the vinyl came with a copy of the CD as well. The CD and both LP versions were released by Black Market Activities, but only the CD was distributed by Metal Blade Records.

The Jordan Rudess solo in "Transient Exuberance" samples from his portion in Dream Theater's "Octavarium"

== Track listing ==
No.	Title	Length
1.	"Skullgrid"	1:07
2.	"Canada"	5:31
3.	"Of Cursed Womb"	2:58
4.	"You Are Number Six"	8:50
5.	"Some Mist"	3:47
6.	"Scepters"	3:43
7.	"Transient Exuberance"	7:37

== Personnel ==
- Colin Marston – bass guitar, recording, mastering, mixing
- Mike Lerner – electric guitar, additional recording, additional editing
- Charlie Zeleny – drums, additional recording, additional editing
- Dani Koesterich - Recording (Rudess solo)
- Terry Grow - Artwork
- Stacy Wakefield Forte - Layout

=== Guest musicians ===
- Mick Barr – Guitar solo ("You Are Number Six")
- Jordan Rudess – Continuum solo ("Transient Exuberance")
