= Spastic Ink =

American progressive metal band

- Origin: San Antonio, Texas, United States
- Genres: Progressive Metal, Instrumental Rock, technical thrash metal
- Years active: 1993–2004
- Members: Ron Jarzombek; Bobby Jarzombek; Pete Perez; Jason McMaster

Spastic Ink was an American progressive metal band.

== History ==
Spastic Ink was formed in 1993 by guitarist Ron Jarzombek of Watchtower after recovering from multiple hand surgeries that rendered him unable to play for a number of years. He would be joined by brother Bobby Jarzombek on drums and bass player Pete Perez (both of Riot at the time). The trio soon recorded a demo album consisting of 11 songs which was brought to various labels in hopes of landing a record deal and the necessary funds to re-record the material properly. However, the band's experimental style was deemed "not commercially viable" and these attempts were unsuccessful. Eventually, the band was able to secure a licensing agreement with German-based independent label Dream Circle Records for the largely unaltered release of the original demos. Ink Complete was released in 1997, and met with positive reception. Only months later, Dream Circle went bankrupt and the band lost out on several thousand dollars in royalties. Ron Jarzombek reissued the album on his own EclecticElectric label in 2000 with 25 minutes of "work tapes" added as bonus material.

Work on a follow-up would prove tedious as Ron was forced to expand the original 3-piece line-up due to Bobby and Pete's commitments with Riot and Bobby joining Halford, the new band formed by former Judas Priest vocalist Rob Halford in 2000. Both Sean Reinert (Cynic, Gordian Knot) and Asgeir Mickelson (Spiral Architect) were set to perform drum tracks at certain times, but backed out due to conflicts with other projects. With the album in limbo, Ron Jarzombek turned his attention to doing a solo album, Solitarily Speaking of Theoretical Confinement, utilizing programmed drums and playing everything himself. Eventually, Ron would re-focus on Spastic Ink, with both Dave Penna and Jeff Eber of Dysrhythmia contributing drum tracks and brother Bobby cutting the rest of the tracks in between work with Halford. Jarzombek also got contributions from fellow guitarist Marty Friedman (ex-Megadeth), Pain of Salvation vocalist Daniel Gildenlöw, Watchtower bandmates Jason McMaster and Doug Keyser, bassists Pete Perez, Sean Malone (Cynic), Ray Riendeau (Halford, Machines of Loving Grace), and Michael Manring (Michael Hedges, Attention Deficit), as well as keyboardists Jens Johansson (Stratovarius), Jimmy Pitts (Scholomance, The Fractured Dimension), and David Bagsby. Ink Compatible was released in 2004 via Jarzombek's EclecticElectric label and Avalon/Marquee in Japan.

== Musical style ==
Spastic Ink specialized in complex instrumental fusion metal by using uncommon time signatures, frequent changes of time signatures and extremely unusual melodies. For example, the song "A Wild Hare" aurally recreates a scene from Bambi, even down to the dialogue, which is wordlessly mimicked by the guitar. This produces an unusual sound that can come across as cacophonous, especially if the listener is unaware of the connection between the song and the cartoon.

== Discography ==
=== Albums ===
- Ink Complete (Dream Circle 1997), (EclecticElectric 2000)
- Ink Compatible (ElectricElectric / Marquee/Avalon 2004)

== Members ==
- Ron Jarzombek: Guitars (1993 - 2004), Programming (2000-2004)
- Pete Perez: Bass Guitar (1993-2004)
- Bobby Jarzombek: Drums (1993-2004)
- Jason McMaster: Vocals (2000-2004)
