= Punishment for Decadence =

Studio album by Coroner
- Released: 1 August 1988
- Recorded: May 1988
- Studios: Sky Trak Studios, Berlin, Germany
- Genres: Technical thrash metal, heavy metal, progressive metal
- Length: 38:54
- Label: Noise
- Producer: Guy Bidmead

Coroner chronology
R.I.P. (1987)	Punishment for Decadence (1988)	No More Color (1989)

Professional ratings
Review scores
Source	Rating
AllMusic	4/5 stars
Collector's Guide to Heavy Metal	7/10

Punishment for Decadence is the second album by the Swiss thrash metal band Coroner, released on 1 August 1988.

== Track listing ==
All lyrics are written by Marquis Marky, except where noted; all music is composed by Tommy T. Baron and Ron Royce, except where noted.

No.	Title	Length
1.	"Intro" (instrumental)	0:12
2.	"Absorbed"	3:43
3.	"Masked Jackal"	4:46
4.	"Arc-Lite" (instrumental)	3:20
5.	"Skeleton on Your Shoulder"	5:35
6.	"Sudden Fall"	4:50
7.	"Shadow of a Lost Dream"	4:31
8.	"The New Breed"	4:52
9.	"Voyage to Eternity"	3:45
10.	"Purple Haze" (Jimi Hendrix cover)	3:20
Total length:		38:54

== Personnel ==
All information is taken from the CD liner notes of the 1988 release.

Coroner

- Ron Broder (as Ron Royce) – vocals, bass
- Tommy Vetterli (as Tommy T. Baron) – guitars
- Marky Edelmann (Marquis Marky) – drums

Additional musicians

- Gary Marlowe – synthesizer, effects
- Dexter – backing vocals, assistant engineer

Production

- Guy Bidmead – producer, engineer
- Andreas Gerhard – assistant engineer
- Marquis Marky – cover, concept and design, photo credits
- Micha Good – skull logo
- Auguste Rodin – front cover sculpture
