= Mental Vortex =

Studio album by Coroner
- Released: 12 August 1991
- Recorded: April–June 1991
- Studios: Sky Trak Studio, Berlin
- Genres: Technical thrash metal; progressive metal; neoclassical metal
- Length: 47:30
- Label: Noise
- Producer: Tom Morris

Coroner chronology
No More Color (1989)	Mental Vortex (1991)	Grin (1993)

Professional ratings
Review scores
Source	Rating
AllMusic	4.5/5 stars
Collector's Guide to Heavy Metal	9/10

Mental Vortex is the fourth album by the Swiss thrash metal band Coroner, released on 12 August 1991.

== Musical style ==
Mental Vortex continues Coroner's experimental approach established in its predecessor, No More Color (1989), blending thrash metal with progressive, jazz fusion, and avant-garde influences. About the album's direction, Eduardo Rivadavia of AllMusic claims, "Unbridled speed and aggression were replaced by highly technical and unconventional songwriting."

== Reissues ==
After being out of print for many years, Noise/BMG reissued the album in 2018, remastered with the same track list in a digipack CD case, including additional photographs of the band and memorabilia.

== Track listing ==
All lyrics are written by Marquis Marky, except where noted.

No.	Title	Lyrics	Music	Length
1.	"Divine Step (Conspectu Mortis)"		Baron, Royce	7:05
2.	"Son of Lilith"		Baron, Royce	6:55
3.	"Semtex Revolution"		Baron	5:31
4.	"Sirens"		Baron, Royce	4:56
5.	"Metamorphosis"		Baron, Royce	5:35
6.	"Pale Sister"		Baron	4:55
7.	"About Life"		Baron	5:18
8.	"I Want You (She's So Heavy)" (The Beatles cover)	Lennon, McCartney	Lennon, McCartney	7:15
Total length:				47:30

== Personnel ==
Coroner

- Ron Broder (as Ron Royce) – vocals, bass
- Tommy Vetterli (as Tommy T. Baron) – guitars
- Marky Edelmann (as Marquis Marky) – drums, cover concept and design

Additional musicians

- Kent Smith – keyboards
- Janelle Sadler – backing vocals
- Steve Gruden – backing vocals

Production

- Tom Morris – producer, engineer, mixing
- Sven Conquest – second engineer
- Karl-U. Walterbach – executive producer
- Martin Becker – photography (cover and sleeve)
- Maren Lotz – typography
- Robbie Müller – digital image

== Charts ==
Chart performance for Mental Vortex
Chart (2026)	Peak position
Swiss Albums (Schweizer Hitparade)	62

== Notes ==
- The intro on "Divine Step" (the "Emergency Room intro") is from the movie Re-Animator.
- Lilith is a female demon of the Mesopotamian mythology.
- The sample at the end of "Semtex Revolution" is from a Dallas news broadcast covering the assassination of John F. Kennedy.
- Semtex is a type of plastic explosive.
- "About Life" samples the line 'We have to see, we have to know' from the film Hellbound: Hellraiser II.
- The cover image is a modified photograph of Anthony Perkins as Norman Bates in the 1960 Alfred Hitchcock film Psycho.
- A music video was made for the song "I Want You (She's So Heavy)".
