= The Machinations of Dementia =

Studio album by Blotted Science
- Released: September 18, 2007
- Recorded: 2006–2007, Live Oak Studios, Hell Whole Studios, Doc Z Studios
- Genres: Progressive metal, instrumental rock
- Length: 57:12
- Label: EclecticElectric
- Producer: Ron Jarzombek

Blotted Science chronology
The Machinations of Dementia (2007)	The Animation of Entomology (2011)

The Machinations of Dementia is the sole studio album by the instrumental progressive metal band Blotted Science, released September 18, 2007, on guitarist Ron Jarzombek's EclecticElectric label. It was issued in Japan on June 22, 2011, via Marquee/Avalon.

The album had been in the making since 2005, but progress stalled when original drummer Chris Adler had to bow out due to commitments with his band Lamb of God; his successor, Derek Roddy (ex-Nile, Hate Eternal), left over "musical differences" after a six-month tenure.

According to Ron Jarzombek, "75 percent" of The Machinations of Dementia was written utilizing The Circle of 12 Notes.

== Track listing ==
No.	Title	Music	Length
1.	"Synaptic Plasticity"	Alex Webster	5:57
2.	"Laser Lobotomy"	Webster	5:21
3.	"Brain Fingerprinting"	Ron Jarzombek	3:34
4.	"Oscillation Cycles"	Webster	1:38
5.	"Activation Synthesis Theory"	Jarzombek	8:10
6.	"R.E.M."	Jarzombek	1:12
7.	"Night Terror"	Webster	4:51
8.	"Bleeding in the Brain"	Webster	4:57
9.	"Vegetation"	Jarzombek	1:29
10.	"Narcolepsy"	Webster	2:53
11.	"E.E.G. Tracing"	Jarzombek	4:04
12.	"Sleep Deprivation"	Jarzombek	0:37
13.	"The Insomniac"	Jarzombek	3:56
14.	"Amnesia"	Webster	2:24
15.	"Adenosine Breakdown"	Jarzombek	3:10
16.	"Adenosine Buildup"	Jarzombek	3:10
Total length:			57:23

== Music theory ==
"Oscillation Cycles" is composed around a tone row of 12 notes played forward, and then backwards. The song only consists of these two note patterns, which then undergo temporal modulation and rhythmic changes.

"Adenosine Buildup" is "Adenosine Breakdown" played backwards.

"R.E.M." has a twelve tone row laid out on a clock. When a note is played, the next can either be the same, or one of the notes next to it on the clock.

== Personnel ==
- Ron Jarzombek - guitars
- Alex Webster - bass
- Charlie Zeleny - drums

== Production ==
- Arranged by Blotted Science
- Produced and mixed by Ron Jarzombek
- Guitars recorded by Ron Jarzombek at Live Oak Studios
- Bass recorded by Alex Webster at Hell Whole Studios (editing by Ron Jarzombek)
- Drums recorded and edited by Charlie Zeleny (at Doc Z Studios), with assistance from Ron Jarzombek
- Mastered by Jacob Hansen
- Copyright Spastic Music Publishing
