= R.I.P. (Coroner album) =

Studio album by Coroner
- Released: 1 June 1987
- Recorded: March 1987
- Studios: Music Lab, Berlin
- Genres: Technical thrash metal; progressive metal; neoclassical metal
- Length: 44:57
- Label: Noise
- Producers: Coroner and Harris Johns

Coroner chronology
R.I.P. (1987)	Punishment for Decadence (1988)

Professional ratings
Review scores
Source	Rating
AllMusic	3/5 stars
Collector's Guide to Heavy Metal	4/10

R.I.P. is the debut album released by the Swiss thrash metal band Coroner on 1 June 1987. This album marks the first chapter of the band's progression (thus it is less focused) and is characterized by raw speed and power (save for the instrumentals), representing an early progressive blend of neoclassical metal and thrash metal.

== Track listing ==
All songs written and arranged by Ron Broder & Tommy Vetterli, except where noted. All lyrics written by Marky Edelmann, except where noted.

No.	Title	Lyrics	Music	Length
1.	"Intro" (Instrumental)			1:23
2.	"Reborn Through Hate"			4:53
3.	"When Angels Die"			4:41
4.	"Intro (Nosferatu)" (instrumental)			1:12
5.	"Nosferatu" (instrumental)			3:34
6.	"Suicide Command"			4:20
7.	"Spiral Dream"	Tom G. Warrior		4:03
8.	"R.I.P."			5:36
9.	"Coma"			4:15
10.	"Fried Alive"			4:40
11.	"Intro (Totentanz)" (instrumental)		Robert de Visée	0:52
12.	"Totentanz"	Andy M. Siegrist		4:13
13.	"Outro" (instrumental)			1:15

== Personnel ==
Coroner

- Ron Broder (as Ron Royce) – vocals, bass
- Tommy Vetterli (as Tommy T. Baron) – guitars
- Marky Edelmann (as Marquis Marky) – drums

Production

- Harris Johns – producer, engineer, mixing
- M. Marky – cover design, pictures
- Micha Good – skull logo
- Alex Solca – band photos

== Notes ==
- Nosferatu is a synonym for vampire and is the title of film by F.W. Murnau, though it is not known whether this film had a direct influence on Coroner.
- The intro of "Totentanz" is actually a cover of the Bourrée from the suite No. 9 in D minor (1686 Livre de Pieces pour la Guitarre) by the French baroque composer Robert de Visée (c.1650 – 1725), and was written by A.M. Siegrist.
- The 12" vinyl and cassette releases by former Canadian record label Cobra Records cuts the track listing short to 8 songs, excluding "Spiral Dream" and the instrumentals and keeping only Nosferatu.
- The 1993 cassette release by former Italian record label Armando Curcio Editore excludes "Spiral Dream" and the "Outro" song.
