= Ink Complete =

Studio album by Spastic Ink
- Released: August 12, 1997
- Genre: Instrumental rock, progressive metal
- Length: 48:37
- Label: Dream Circle; EclecticElectric

Spastic Ink chronology
Ink Complete (1997)	Ink Compatible (2004)

Professional ratings
Review scores
Source	Rating
Allmusic	4.5/5 stars

Ink Complete is progressive instrumental band Spastic Ink's debut album, released in 1997 via Germany's Dream Circle label and re-issued in 2000 on EclecticElectric, with 25 minutes of 'work tapes' added as bonus tracks.

== Track listing ==
1. "The Mad Data Race" – 5:15
2. "A Morning with Squeakie" – 3:24
3. "Just a Little Dirty" – 1:43
4. "See, and It's Sharp!" – 4:31
5. "Suspended on All Fours" – 2:04
6. "A Wild Hare" – 8:15
7. "Harm and Half-Time Baking Shuffle" – 2:46
8. "To Counter and Groove in E Minor" – 4:05
9. "That 178 Thing" – 4:27
10. "Eighths Is Enough" – 4:00
11. "Mosquito Brain Surgery" – 8:11
12. (Hidden track) – 24:48

== Personnel ==
- Ron Jarzombek – guitar
- Bobby Jarzombek – drums
- Pete Perez – bass
