= Coroner (band) =

Swiss thrash metal band

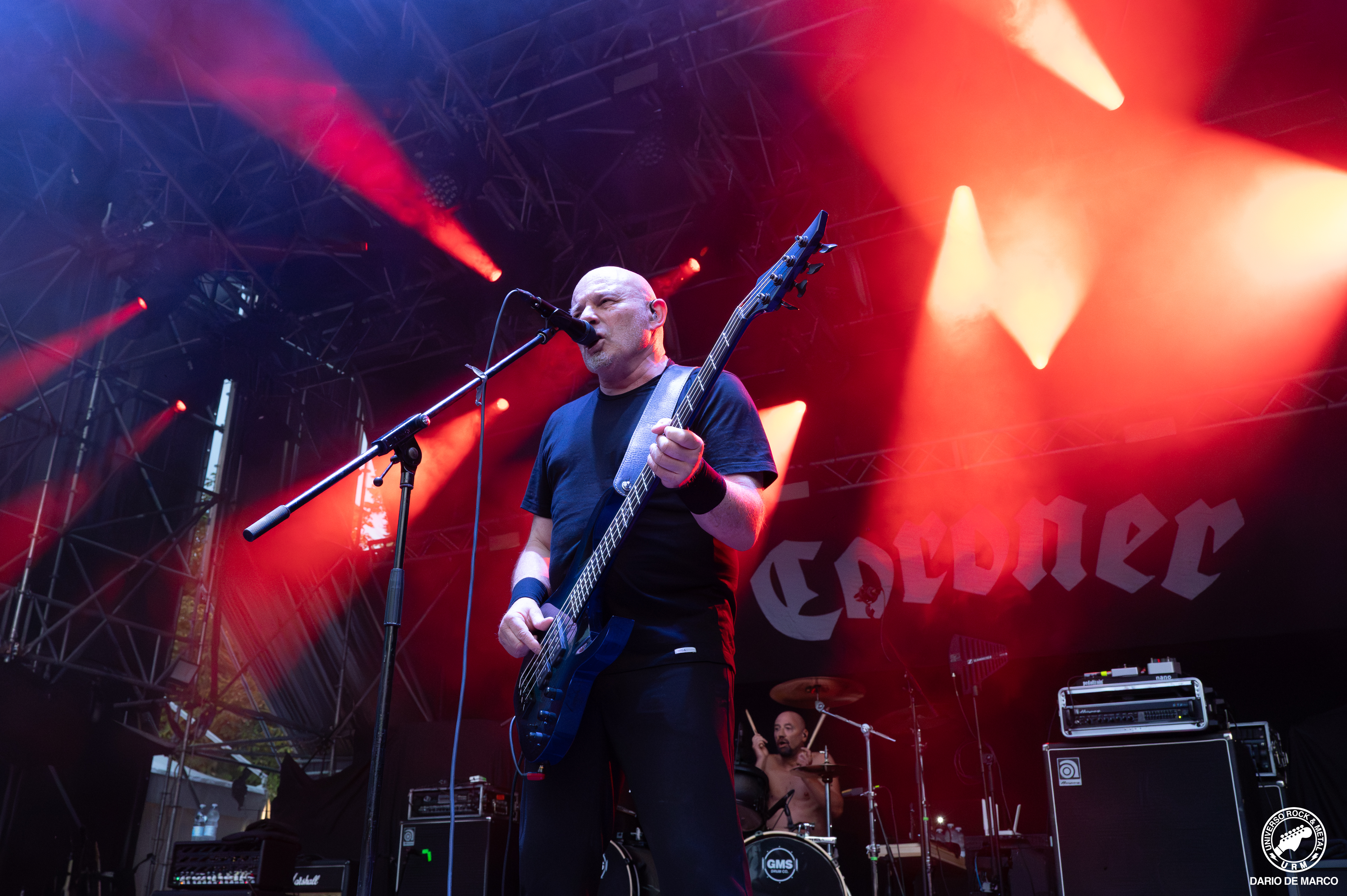
- Coroner in 2025

Background information
- Origin: Zürich, Switzerland
- Genres: Technical thrash metal; progressive metal
- Years active: 1983–1996; 2010–present
- Labels: Noise; Century Media
- Members: Ron Broder; Tommy Vetterli; Diego Rappachietti
- Past members: Marky Edelmann; Oliver Amberg; Pete Attinger; Tommy Ritter; Phil Puzctai
- Website: coroner-reunion.com

Coroner is a Swiss thrash metal band from Zürich, active from 1983 to 1996 and again from 2010 onward. To date, the band has released six studio albums: R.I.P. (1987), Punishment for Decadence (1988), No More Color (1989), Mental Vortex (1991), Grin (1993), and Dissonance Theory (2025).

Coroner's music has combined elements of thrash, classical music, avant-garde music, progressive rock, jazz, and later on in their career, industrial metal and groove metal, with suitably gruff vocals. With their increasingly complex style of progressive-infused thrash, they have been called "the Rush of thrash metal", and along with Voivod and Watchtower, the band has been credited for helping pioneer the subgenre of technical thrash metal during the mid-to-late 1980s. Coroner's sound then progressed and the production became more refined, resulting in a more progressive sound on later albums such as No More Color, Mental Vortex, Grin and Dissonance Theory, while the latter two also saw the band adopt characteristics of groove metal. Their early works had a strong influence on the death metal scene of the late 1980s/early 1990s, especially on the technical death metal subgenre.

== History ==
=== Career and breakup ===
Coroner in the late 1980s. From left to right: Ron Broder (Ron Royce), Tommy Vetterli (Tommy T. Baron), and Marky Edelmann (Marquis Marky)

The members of Coroner were originally roadies for Celtic Frost. They eventually cut their own songs, recording their demo Death Cult in 1986 with Tom G. Warrior of Celtic Frost on vocals. Their first full-length album R.I.P., released in 1987, featured bass player Ron Broder on vocals and he assumed the role for the rest of the group's existence. The meaning of the band name Coroner is related to the crown or officer of the crown that is referenced by some of their songs.

Coroner released four more studio albums within next decade: Punishment for Decadence (1988), No More Color (1989), Mental Vortex (1991) and Grin (1993), as well as the compilation album Coroner (1995), which also included some new and unreleased material; each release was acclaimed by critics and the public alike. Other than having toured relentlessly for more than half a decade (including the US three times), and all of their music videos receiving airplay on MTV's Headbangers Ball ("Masked Jackal", "Last Entertainment" and the cover version of the Beatles' "I Want You (She's So Heavy)"), Coroner did not achieve much commercial success, which had contributed to the band slowly falling apart during the mid-1990s. Coroner officially disbanded after a farewell tour consequent to the self-titled album in January and February 1996.

=== Reunion ===
In March 2005, talks of a reunion were in the works, but later retracted. The main reason was that neither Marky, Ron, nor Tommy had the time it would require to do this properly, and also that none of them liked to "reheat things, except spaghetti sauce." In June 2010, however, Coroner announced that they would reunite for next year's installments of Maryland Deathfest, Hellfest and Bloodstock Open Air. The band was asked if they were planning to write a new album. Guitarist Tommy Vetterli replied, "you know, making a new album is kind of difficult... (Pause) Well, you never know. Maybe after four or five shows we'll get into it and say, 'Hey! Let's do an album!' Nobody knows what's going to happen. We don't have a master plan".

In April 2011, drummer Marky Edelmann was asked why Coroner decided to reunite after their 15-year break up. He replied, "It was a total trip; it was really like a time warp. It was totally strange. Sometimes you could play the songs automatically; it was still somehow programmed. It was really funny; your arms go left and right, and you don't know why. 'Oh, wow, that's why. I have to hit this cymbal right now.' [Laughs] So that was really quite a trip. It makes me feel like being [brought] back [in time] 15 years or more. And I missed playing drums, totally. That was also something I'm very happy about now — to just play drums." Marky also stated that a new Coroner album was not in the cards, but he also stated that the band could reissue their back catalog.

In June 2011, Vetterli told RadioMetal.com that Coroner has been recording shows for a future live album and also plan to release a career spanning DVD in the future. Asked about new material, he mentioned that they might record one song or two. Tommy also stated that if Coroner makes a new album he would have to "try to convince" Marky and Ron and would not do it without them.

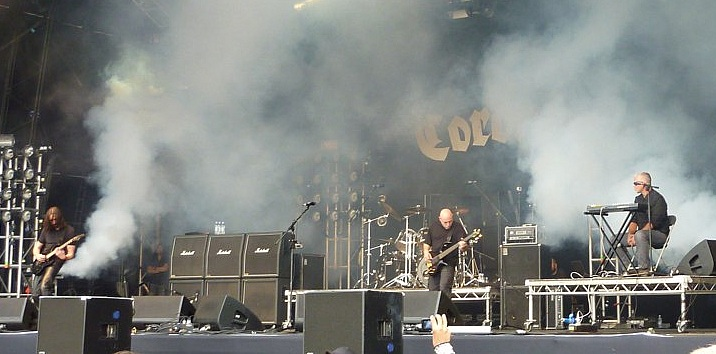
Coroner at Bloodstock Open Air 2011

On 12 February 2014, drummer Marky Edelmann announced that he would be leaving Coroner at the end of the month, citing a disinterest in new material, as opposed to Broder and Vetterli. On 24 May 2014, Diego Rapacchietti was announced as the new drummer for Coroner.

Despite their earlier decision not to release new material, guitarist Tommy Vetterli stated that Coroner plans to work on a potential follow-up to Grin. In June 2015, Ron revealed in an interview (released on Italian webzine "Artists and Bands") that: "We are still individually in the process of collecting songwriting ideas. We have not started recording yet, but once we come together, it will probably proceed quickly. We are planning on hitting the studio towards the end of this year, hopefully." On 26 July 2016, it was announced that Coroner had entered the studio to begin recording their new album, which was initially set for release in 2017; however, it did not surface in 2017 and there had been no news about the album until April 2020, when Coroner announced via Twitter that they were "going to record a NEW album this year." In a May 2021 interview with Agoraphobic News, former drummer Markus "Marky" Edelmann (who has remained in contact with his former bandmates since leaving Coroner in 2014) stated that the band was planning to "finally go to the studio this fall" to work on their new album. In a May 2022 interview, Vetterli said, "We've actually started the recording, we have started recording drums, six songs are recorded and two more songs are ready, but Ron's part is missing and then we have to write another one, and then we hit the studio and record it."

November 2020 saw work begin on the official band biography. Undertaken by writer Kriscinda Lee Everitt, this book will draw on extensive internationally sourced press from 1986 to the present and equally substantial personal interviews with Marky Edelmann, Ron Broder, and Tommy Vetterli, plus musicians, producers, promoters, managers, myriad fellow travelers, and fans. As of 2022, the book has an Instagram and Facebook presence where fans can stay updated on its progress.

The first song from their sixth album, titled "Sacrificial Lamb", had its exclusively live premiere on 8 October 2022 during a show in Seewen. At the end of its performance, Broder stated that "it is a new song from the album that will hopefully premiere next year". On 3 March 2025, Broder confirmed during a show in Baltimore, Maryland that the new album would be released in October of the same year. Following this confirmation, an "Album Release Show" was announced on 28 March 2025, scheduled in Zürich, Switzerland on 14 November 2025. Coroner released their first song in more than three decades, "Renewal", on 15 August 2025 and announced on the same day that their sixth studio album Dissonance Theory would be released on 17 October. On September 17, a follow-up single titled "Symmetry" was released.

In 2025, the band participated in the Hell's Heroes music festival held at the White Oak Music Hall in Houston. In an interview with Sonic Perspectives in October of that year, Vetterli confirmed that "there might be another album in two or three years."

== Evolution and style ==
Musically, Coroner evolved from a thrash metal band with gothic and classical overtones like Celtic Frost and Bathory into a technical metal band. Coroner's first album, R.I.P., was based on neoclassical lines and was technical and classically influenced.

The second album, Punishment for Decadence, saw a progression into a more complex sound with a unison of bass and guitar. Tempo changes interspersed mid-paced sections and the odd slow passage between the faster passages started to emerge. Lyrically, Coroner began to write about themes such as politics and personal introspection. The album contains some of their more well-known songs, including "Skeleton on Your Shoulder" which appears in the video game Brütal Legend.

No More Color was produced by Pete Hinton and the band. Coroner's music became more technical on No More Color as the guitar work was characterized by intricate modes and arpeggios, solo work that was chromatically colorful, as well as the de rigueur crunchy chords and speed runs; the drumming went beyond the 4/4 time of Coroner's two previous albums to incorporate unusual time signatures which became their trademark. Ron Royce's bass playing is also worth a mention as having an advanced three-finger technique which enables him to double the rhythm line as well as perform more intricate riffs. Prime examples of this are the opener "Die By My Hand" with its vicious riffing and the harmonic minor inspired riff in the middle of "Mistress of Deception". The closer "Last Entertainment" is a prescient take on TV. The opening track "Die By My Hand" is a classic piece of prog come thrash metal.

Mental Vortex continued the evolution over No More Color. Continuing with the previous album's technical formula, the speed metal formula was re-integrated into Coroner's sound on this album but with a tone that made it sound not at all like R.I.P. or Punishment for Decadence. There were slower songs but none of the songs on Mental Vortex stayed the same speed for very long. The songs on Mental Vortex ranged from four to eight minutes. The last track "I Want You (She's So Heavy)" is a cover of the Beatles song, and a video was shot of it. Overall, the tone was a shift from the thrash/technical of No More Color which showed them gravitating towards their opus Grin.

Grin saw a much more industrial and groovy sound and was a natural progression from Mental Vortex but was different from most of their previous material. It involved reflective guitar riffs and underlying bass line. It was a slower record and more refined in its metal sensibility. Brooding guitar over Royce's bass produced an almost hypnotic trance-like sound on some tracks. The lead guitar still shone on all tracks.

Their self-titled album, Coroner, was a compilation which contained unreleased material, a selection of hits from previous albums, and a remix of the title song from the previous album Grin.

Throughout their discography and touring, Coroner has played in progressively lower tunings, starting with E standard on R.I.P., Punishment For Decadence and No More Color, E-flat on Mental Vortex, D on Grin, and D-flat on Dissonance Theory as well as their main live tuning ever since their reunion tour in 2011 (which includes previous catalogue in this tuning as well). "Symmetry", recorded and played in drop B, saw the band's lowest tuning to date.

== Band members ==
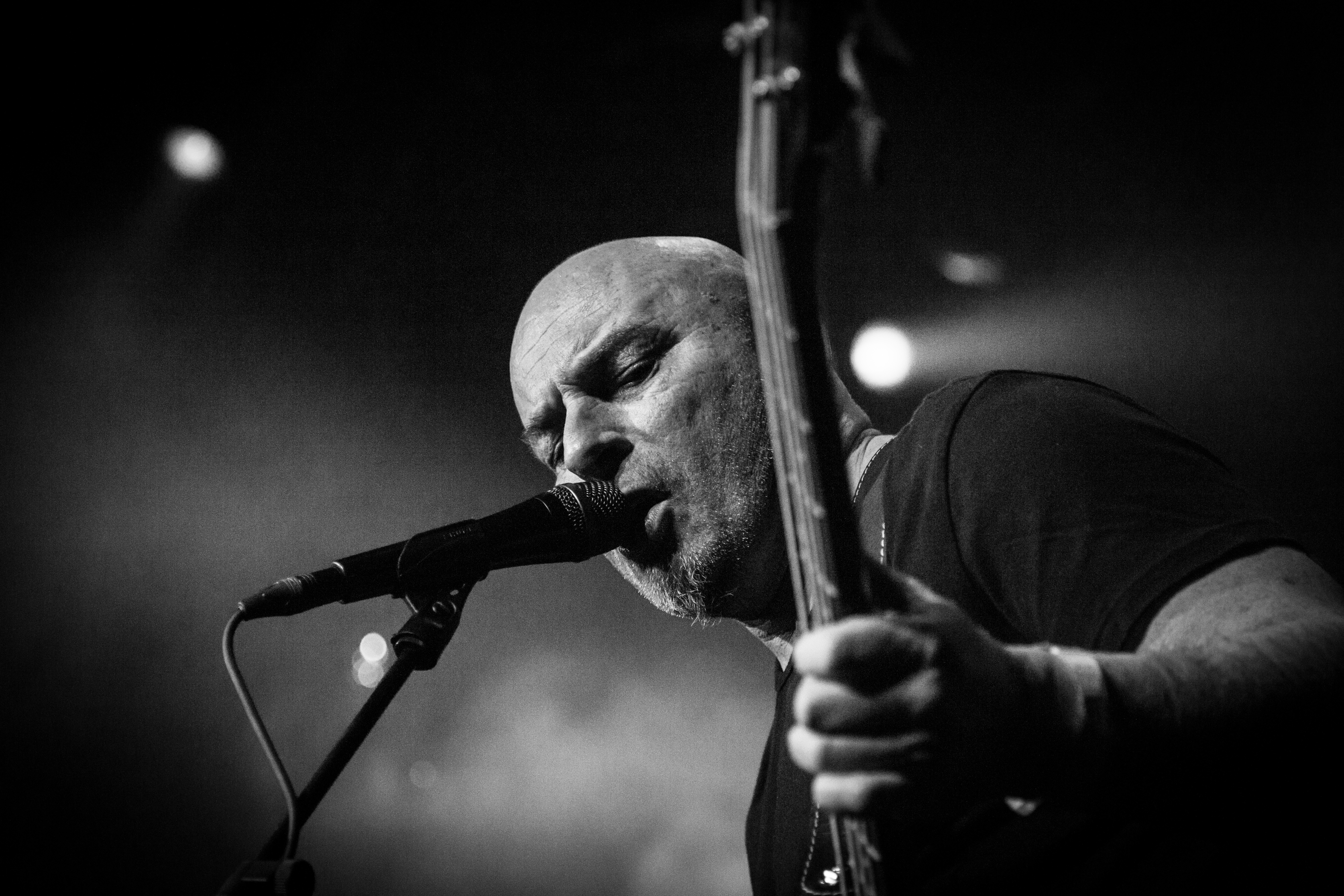
Ron Broder

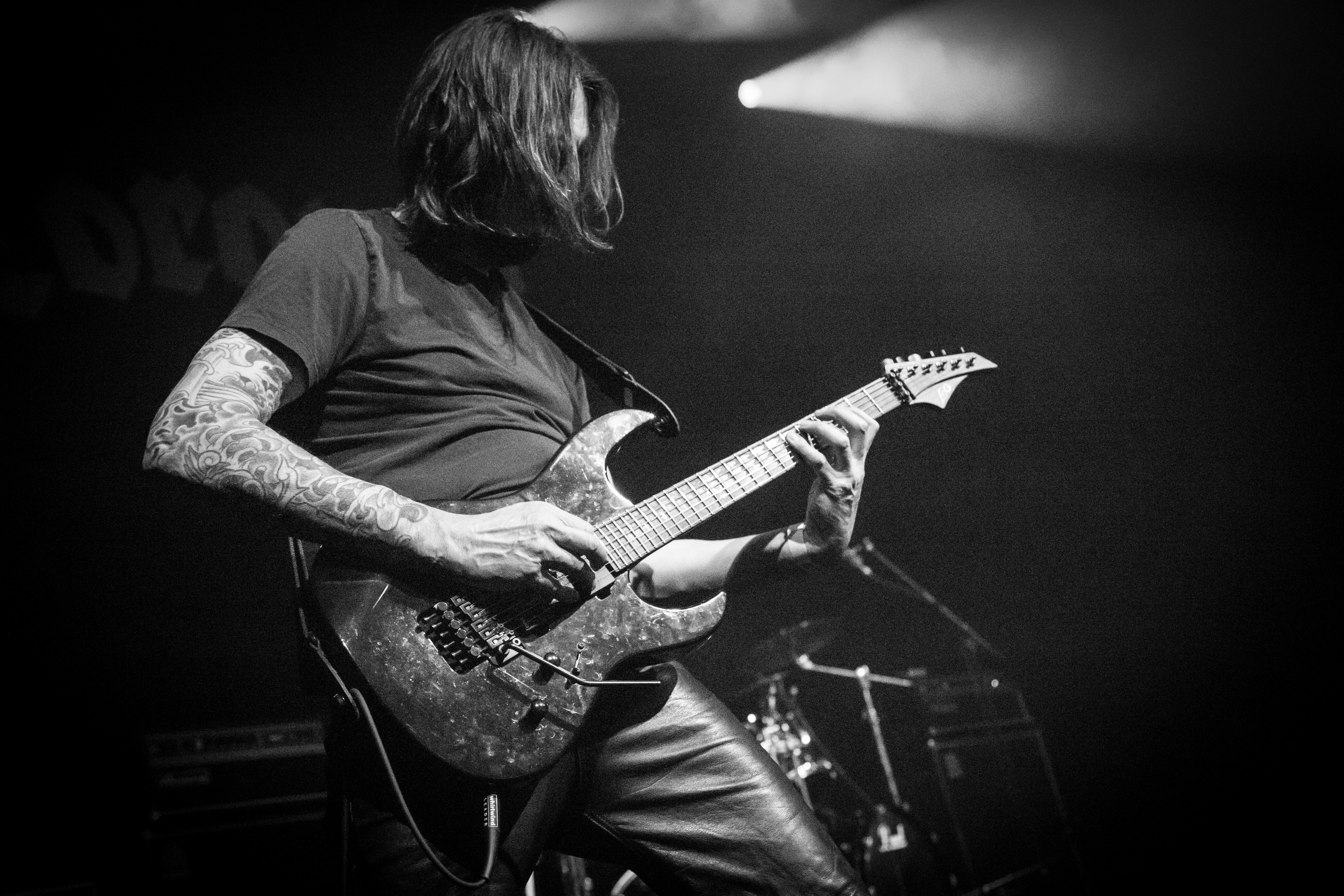
Tommy Vetterli

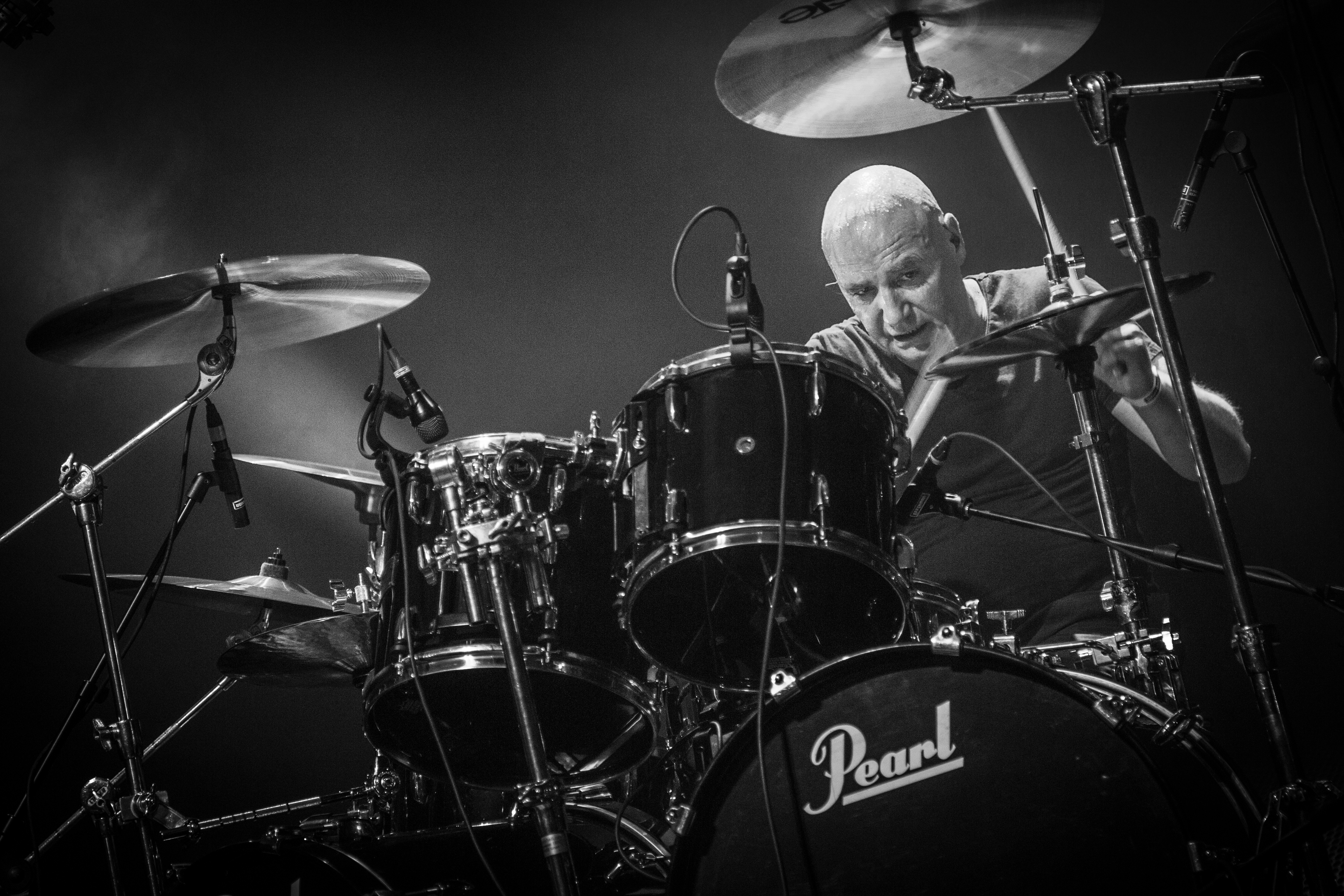
Diego Rapacchietti

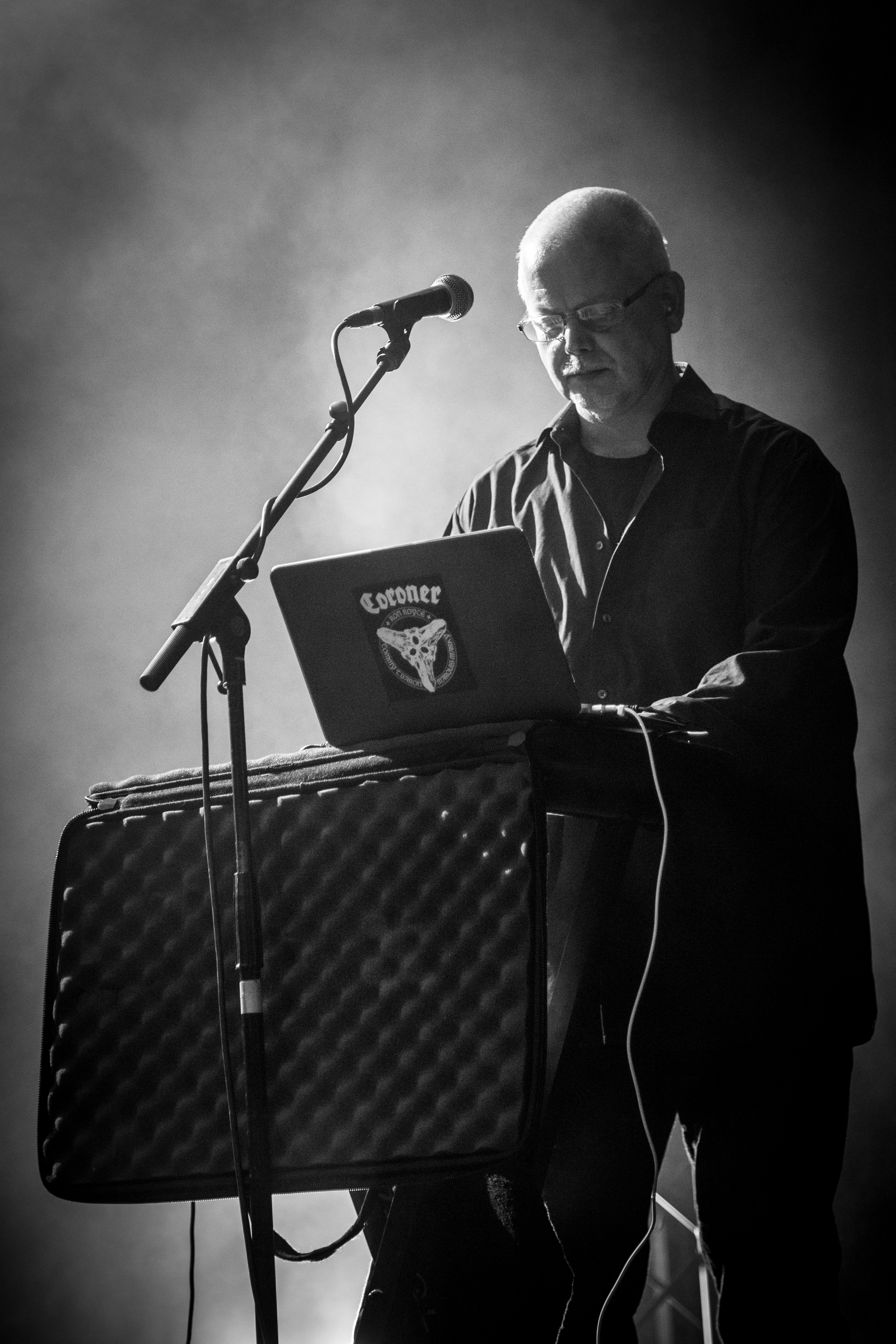
Daniel Stössel

As of 2014, no founding member has remained in Coroner, since founding drummer Marquis Marky left the band that year after a 31-year duty. Bassist/vocalist Ron Royce and guitarist Tommy T. Baron have been the only continual members of Coroner since 1985.

=== Current ===
- Ron Broder (as Ron Royce) – bass, lead vocals (1985–1996, 2010–present)
- Tommy Vetterli (as Tommy T. Baron) – guitars, backing vocals (1985–1996, 2010–present)
- Diego Rapacchietti – drums (2014–present)

=== Former ===
- Pete Attinger – vocals (1983–1984)
- Phil Puzctai – bass (1983–1984)
- Tommy Ritter – guitars (1983–1984)
- Oliver Amberg – guitars (1984–1985)
- René Schmidt – guitars (1986)
- Marky Edelmann (as Marquis Marky) – drums (1983–1996, 2010–2014)

=== Touring ===
- Daniel Stössel – keyboards, samples, backing vocals (1996, 2010–present)

== Discography ==
=== Studio albums ===
- R.I.P. (1987)
- Punishment for Decadence (1988)
- No More Color (1989)
- Mental Vortex (1991)
- Grin (1993)
- Dissonance Theory (2025)

=== Compilations ===
- Coroner (1995)
- The Unknown: Unreleased Tracks 1985–95 (1996)

Includes two demo tracks, two remixes, the soundtrack for an unreleased documentary, and a record of one of their last concerts before the reunion.

=== Singles ===
- "Die by My Hand" (1989)
- "Purple Haze" (1989)
- "I Want You (She's So Heavy)" (1991)
- "Renewal" (2025)
- "Symmetry" (2025)

=== Demos ===
- Depth of Hell (1983)
- Death Cult (1986)
- R.I.P. (1987)
- Punishment for Decadence (1988)

== Videography ==
- No More Color Tour '90: Live in East Berlin (1990, VHS/LaserDisc)
- "Masked Jackal" (music video)
- "Last Entertainment" (music video)
- "I Want You (She's So Heavy)" (music video)
- "Renewal" (music video)
- "Symmetry" (music video)
