= Anuryzm =

Heavy Metal

- Origin: United Arab Emirates
- Genres: Progressive metal, thrash metal
- Years active: 2003–present
- Labels: Melodic Revolution Records
- Members: John Bakhos (guitars); Jay Jahed (synths); Rami Lakkis (bass); Simen Sandnes (drums); Will Patterson (vocals)
- Website: www.anuryzm.com

Anuryzm is a progressive heavy metal band, based in the United Arab Emirates, featuring contributors from a wide variety of backgrounds and nationalities.

== Biography ==
Anuryzm is a project created by Canadian guitarist John Bakhos in 2003 as a means to branch out from his background in extreme metal in favor of progressive heavy metal music. In 2010, after returning to the United Arab Emirates, Bakhos reconnected with British vocalist Nadeem Michel Bibby and forged the recording incarnation of Anuryzm.

The band independently released their debut album Worm's Eye View in 2011. It featured guest performances by Martin Lopez (Soen, Opeth, Amon Amarth) on drums and by Uri Dijk (Textures, Ethereal), who performed synths on one track. The album was subsequently re-released in 2012 in the United States via Melodic Revolution Records, and in Japan via Asian Rock Rising. The album cycle also saw the recruitment of additional members for live performances.

Throughout 2012 and 2013, the band performed as guests for acts including Nightwish, Epica, Dark Tranquillity, Avenged Sevenfold, and Yngwie Malmsteen.

As part of a one–off show during the recording of the band's second album, Anuryzm performed as special guests to Black Sabbath at the Du Arena, Abu Dhabi, on the Middle Eastern stopover of their world tour.

The band's second album All Is Not For All was released on 15 June 2015. A European tour in support of the album commenced in the fall of 2016, entitled "Awakening The Humanoids."

Following vocalist Nadeem Michel Bibby's departure in 2019, the band are continuing to work on a third album set for release in 2020.

== Discography ==
Studio albums

- Worm's Eye View (11 October 2011, re-released worldwide in 2012)
- All is Not for All (15 June 2015)

Singles

- "Wide Awake" (11 October 2011)
- "Breaking the Ballot" (6 November 2011)
- "Humanoid" (20 April 2015)
- "Depolarized" (18 May 2015)
- "199X" (13 January 2016)
- "Etheride" (December 2019)

== Members ==
=== Current line-up ===
- John Bakhos – guitars (2010–present)
- Jay Jahed – keyboards, synths (2011–present)
- Rami Lakkis – bass (2010–2014, 2019–present)
- Simen Sandnes – drums (2019–present)
- Will Patterson – vocals (2007–2009, 2019–present)

=== Former members ===
- Nadeem Michel Bibby – vocals (2010–2019)
- Sertaç Ögüt – guitars (2015–2018)
- Faissal Itani – bass (2015–2018)
- Rudy Fares – drums (2016–2018)
- Imad Dahleh – drums (2011– 2015)
- Miltiadis Kyvernitis – guitars (2011–2014)
- Rany Battikh – bass (2014–2016)
- John Laham – drums (2016)
- Colin Krane – guitars (2007–2009)
- Stu McNeil – bass (2007–2009)
- Andrew Bettio – drums (2007–2009)
- Bernard Moussali – guitars (2003–2005)
- Sami Khawam – bass (2003–2005)
- Roger Moussali – drums (2003–2005)
- Yanad Zwein – vocals (2003–2005)

=== Session musicians ===
- Martin Lopez – drums on the album Worm's Eye View
- Uri Dijk – synths on the track "Breaking The Ballot" and on the album All Is Not For All
- Christopher James Chaplin – strings on the track "Oceans Apart"
- Charlie Zeleny – drums and percussion on the album All Is Not For All
- Michael Lepond – bass guitars on the album All Is Not For All
