= Ron Jarzombek =

American guitarist

- Born: December 14, 1964 (age 61)
- Genres: Progressive metal; heavy metal; thrash metal; technical death metal; instrumental rock
- Occupation: Guitarist
- Years active: 1984–present
- Website: ronjarzombek.com

Ron Jarzombek is an American guitarist best known for his work with WatchTower, Spastic Ink, and Blotted Science, featuring Alex Webster of Cannibal Corpse. His most recent project is Terrestrial Exiled. He released a brand new song, "Beyond Life And Cosmic Kinetics" (B.L.A.C.K.), as an interactive six-track multi-tracking app in November 2012.

Jarzombek has guested with a number of artists ranging from fellow guitarists Marty Friedman and Jeff Loomis to death metal outfits Obscura and Odious Mortem as well as Protest The Hero. He has also collaborated with Cynic offshoot Gordian Knot and Lamb of God drummer Chris Adler. He teaches guitar in San Antonio, Texas and is a member of local Rush tribute band Exit Stage Left.

== Influence ==
Ron has been hailed as one of the most influential progressive metal guitarists and has been called the "Godfather of Technical Metal''. He has been cited as an influence by numerous players, particularly from the burgeoning technical death metal scene, most prominently Muhammed Suiçmez of Necrophagist. Ron is also featured in the 2009 book The 100 Greatest Metal Guitarists by British author Joel McIver who calls Jarzombek "the most underrated axemonger ever." Decibel Magazine remarked, "Ron Jarzombek should be a friggin' legend by now" in its review of Blotted Science's The Machinations of Dementia.

== Soundtrack work ==
Ron wrote several exclusive pieces for Atlanta, GA-based Morley Arts Productions, a small animation company. These include the intro to a proposed science fiction short film titled Magnatania and bits featured on the Morley Arts 2005 demo reel which starts off with 'See and It's Sharp' by Spastic Ink. Another unreleased piece utilized was the Vai-esque Martians Marchin', originally meant to be a 'soundtrack for' a lithograph called House of Stairs by M.C. Escher. In 2004, the animated 15-minute space mini-epic Time Ace, produced by Morley Arts and featuring two of Jarzombek's compositions, was awarded 'Best Animation' by a jury of film industry professionals in clickflick.tv's online film festival.

== Equipment ==
Jarzombek plays custom-made guitars he builds himself, the reason being that "I am rather selective when it comes to guitars. For me, it's easier to build a guitar totally from scratch than to buy something off the shelf and customize it. The necks are taken off of guitars that I come across at local music stores." He tunes his guitars to dropped 7-string tuning (A E A D G B or A E A D G B E).

== Discography ==
Solo:

- (1998) – PHHHP! (Mr. Kitty)
- (2002) – Solitarily Speaking Of Theoretical Confinement (Mr. Kitty)
- (2009) – PHHHP! Plus (EclecticElectric)
- (2023) - Apps, Writing Systems and Remakes (Spastic Science Records)

Collaborations:

- (1988) S.A. Slayer – Go For The Throat (Under Den Linden)
- (1989) WatchTower – Control and Resistance (Noise Records)
- (1997) Spastic Ink – Ink Complete (Dream Circle, re-released by EclecticElectric in 2000)
- (1998) Gordian Knot – Gordian Knot (Sensory)
- (2002) WatchTower – Demonstrations in Chaos (archives release) (Monster Records)
- (2004) Spastic Ink – Ink Compatible (EclecticElectric / Marquee/Avalon / Irond)
- (2007) Marty Friedman – Exhibit A – Live In Europe (Avex Entertainment; released by Mascot Records in 2008)
- (2007) Blotted Science – The Machinations of Dementia (EclecticElectric / Marquee/Avalon; released on vinyl by Antithetic Records in 2013)
- (2011) Blotted Science – The Animation of Entomology (EclecticElectric / Basick Records; released on vinyl by Antithetic Records in 2013)
- (2016) WatchTower – Concepts of Math: Book One (Prosthetic Records)

Singles:

- (2010) WatchTower – The Size of Matter (digital release)
- (2011) Terrestrial Exiled – Duodecimal Levorotation (digital release)
- (2012) Ron Jarzombek – Beyond Life and Cosmic Kinetics (app / digital release)

Compilations & guest appearances:

- (1989) Various Artists – Doomsday News 2 (Noise Records) w/ WatchTower
- (1996) Various Artists – 12 Years In Noise: Metal & Beyond [2-CD] (Noise Records) w/ WatchTower
- (1998) Various Artists – The Music Of Raymond Scott (Esotericity)
- (1999) Various Artists – A Tribute To Accept Vol.1 (Nuclear Blast) w/ WatchTower
- (2006) Loch Vostok – Destruction Time Again! (guest guitar solo on "Talk") (Escapi Music)
- (2006) Various Artists – Drum Nation Vol.3 (Magna Carta) w/ Chris Adler
- (2007) Odious Mortem – Cryptic Implosion (guest guitar solo on "Collapse Of Recreation") (Willowtip Records)
- (2008) The Fractured Dimension – Towards the Mysterium (guest guitar solo on "Towards the Mysterium")
- (2008) Jeff Loomis – Zero Order Phase (guest guitar solo on "Jato Unit") (Century Media)
- (2009) Obscura – Cosmogenesis (guest guitar solo on "Cosmogenesis") (Relapse Records)
- (2010) Ray Riendeau – Atmospheres (guest guitar solo on "A Search For Lifeforms") (Groove Theory Records)
- (2013) Protest The Hero – Volition (guest guitar solo on "Drumhead Trial") (Razor & Tie)
- (2014) Hannes Grossmann – The Radial Covenant (guest guitar solo on "The Voyager")
- (2019) Synaptic Collapse – Hemispheric Lateralization (guest guitar solo on "Cognitive Inhibition")

Videos & DVDs:

- (1990) Various Artists – Doomsday News – The Video Compilation Volume 2 (Noise Records) w/ WatchTower
- (2005) Bobby Jarzombek – Performance & Technique (Warner Bros. Publications)+
- (2006) Chris Adler / Jason Bittner – Live At Modern Drummer Festival 2005 (Hudson Music)+
- (2007) Marty Friedman – Exhibit B – Live In Japan (Avex Entertainment)

+ NOTE: Ron is not seen but rather heard as the guitarist and co-writer of some of the music on these DVDs
