= No More Color =

Studio album by Coroner
- Released: 18 September 1989
- Recorded: Sky Trak Studio, Berlin, June 1989
- Genres: Technical thrash metal; progressive metal; neoclassical metal
- Length: 34:22
- Label: Noise
- Producers: Pete Hinton and Coroner

Coroner chronology
Punishment for Decadence (1988)	No More Color (1989)	Mental Vortex (1991)

Professional ratings
Review scores
Source	Rating
AllMusic	3/5 stars
Collector's Guide to Heavy Metal	8/10

No More Color is the third album by Swiss thrash metal band Coroner, released on 18 September 1989 by Noise Records.

== Musical style ==
No More Color was the album where Coroner started to truly "progress", as the songs are still similar to their older, speedy, European thrash metal but start to feature elements of the avant-garde progressive thrash of their later albums, akin to the band's then-labelmates Watchtower. This album also features very proficient instrumentation and incorporation of elements from genres such as jazz fusion, progressive rock and classical music, which would later be an influence on the evolution and maturity of the experimental side of heavy metal, including acts such as Death.

== Reissues ==
After being out of print for many years, Noise/BMG reissued the album in 2018, remastered with the same track list in a digipack cd case, with additional photographs of the band and memorabilia.

== Track listing ==
All lyrics are written by Marquis Marky, except where noted; all music is composed by Tommy T. Baron and Ron Royce.

No.	Title	Lyrics	Length
1.	"Die by My Hand"		3:46
2.	"No Need to Be Human"		4:31
3.	"Read My Scars"		4:32
4.	"D.O.A."		4:19
5.	"Mistress of Deception"		5:00
6.	"Tunnel of Pain"		4:30
7.	"Why It Hurts"	Martin Ain	3:47
8.	"Last Entertainment"		4:00
Total length:			34:22

== Personnel ==
All information is taken from the CD liner notes of the 1989 release.

Coroner

- Ron Broder (as Ron Royce) – vocals, bass
- Tommy Vetterli (as Tommy T. Baron) – guitars
- Marky Edelmann (as Marquis Marky) – drums, spoken word on "Last Entertainment"

Production

- Pete Hinton – production
- Steve Rispin – engineer, synth effects
- Dan Johnson, Scott Burns – mixing at Morrisound Studios, Tampa, Florida
- Karl-Ulrich Walterbach – executive producer
- Martin Becker – photography
- Micha Good – skull and blade logo
