= Orthrelm =

American band

- Origin: Washington, D.C., U.S.
- Genres: Experimental rock, math rock, avant-garde metal, progressive metal
- Years active: 2000–present
- Labels: Ipecac, Three One G, Troubleman Unlimited, Tolotta, Crucial Blast
- Members: Mick Barr; Josh Blair

Orthrelm is an American avant-garde band from Washington, D.C.

== Biography ==
Orthrelm is a duo composed of Mick Barr on guitar and Josh Blair on drums. Their songwriting style is mostly experimental, and shows the influence of avant-garde music as well as shred guitar and minimalism.

== Discography ==
=== Albums ===
- Norildivoth Crallos-Lomrixth Urthiln (2002; Three One G)
- OV (2005; Ipecac Recordings)

=== EPs ===
- Iorxhscimtor (2001, Tolotta Records)
- Orthrelm I (2001, self-released, 20 copies) / digital (2012, Orthrelm bandcamp)
- Orthrelm II (2001, self-released, 50 copies) / digital (2012, Orthrelm bandcamp)
- Asristir Vieldriox (2002, Troubleman Unlimited)
- Untitled 7" (2004, Forge)
- O-3 5" (2007, Soft Targets Journal)
- Orthrelm II II (2012, Orthrelm bandcamp) - previously unreleased 2001 demo
- 20012 (2012, Orthrelm bandcamp)

=== Compilation ===
- Untitled (2010, ugEXPLODE Records) - remastered/remixed old material

=== Split albums ===
- Touchdown/Orthrelm (2002, Troubleman)

=== Split EPs ===
- Orthrelm / Behold... The Arctopus (2006, Crucial Blast Releases)
- Orthrelm / Trencher - Trans Atlantic Asthma Attack (2005)
