= Alan Tecchio =

American-Italian singer

Alan Tecchio is an Italian-American singer, who sang for Seven Witches, Watchtower, Hades and Non-Fiction. He is also the lead vocalist on Symphony X bassist Mike Lepond's first solo album, Mike LePond's Silent Assassins.
