= Hyperion (EP) =

EP by Krallice
- Released: January 1, 2016
- Recorded: July 2013
- Studio: Menegroth, The Thousand Caves
- Genre: Black metal, progressive metal
- Length: 23:52
- Label: Independent
- Producer: Colin Marston

Krallice chronology
Ygg huur (2015)	Hyperion (2016)

Hyperion is the second EP by the American black metal band Krallice. It was released on January 1, 2016. The music had originally been recorded in July 2013 for a split release that never materialised.

== Musical style and writing ==
The music critic Greg Majewski noted the importance of the EP's recording date of July 2013. "The three songs which comprise its 23 minutes act as a virtual bridge between the thematic repetition of 2012’s Years Past Matter and Ygg Huur’s brisker, compact approach. Present-day Krallice – while still retaining the same lineup – is a different beast than its pre-hiatus incarnation; shorter, to-the-point, but no less volatile. As such, Hyperion stands as a document of a band mid-transition, testing the extent of the newfound abilities gained from its members’ extracurricular activities in Gorguts (Marston), the resuscitated Behold the Arctopus (Marston again), death metal bass-drum duo Geryon (McMaster and Weinstein) and the evolving weirdness Mick Barr continues to unleash upon willing ears."

The lyrics frequently refer to astral objects, solar bodies and mythological figures.

== Critical reception ==
Professional ratings
Review scores
Source	Rating
Pitchfork	8.3/10
Spin	8/10
Bearded Gentlemen Music	4.5/5

Hyperion was received positively by music critics. Critics praised the depth and complexity of the compositions as well as the musical growth displayed on it. Pitchfork described the album as "a succinct, explosive encapsulation of the Brooklyn black metal band's evolution and progression during the last decade. This band keeps improving incrementally, avoiding major statements of reinvention or re-emergence in favor of doggedly refining what it is they’ve done from the very start." They highlighted the second track for particular praise, describing it as the band's "new compositional apex" and as "one of the most thrilling, difficult two-minute clips of the band’s career. After you notice it, you have to hear it again and again, standing back to marvel at the sheer audacity of the moment."

Spin magazine's Colin Joyce wrote that the EP "marked another subtle transformation for the Brooklyn quartet. Previously content to craft assemblages of nothing but jagged edges, they sand away the instrumental excess on this three-track, sub-30-minute release, so that even a ten-minute cavalcade of French-braided guitar workouts called “Assuming Memory” feels economical. represents a new highpoint in sheer density for guitarists Mick Barr and Colin Marston's six-stringed entanglement, but it doesn't happen at the expense of the effusive torrents of energy that make the band so life-affirming in the first place. They're adding more layers to an already complicated formula, but doing so with a sleight of hand."

Greg Majewski of Invisible Oranges stated: "Hyperion stands as a document of a band mid-transition, testing the extent of the newfound abilities gained from its members' extracurricular activities... What Krallice have given us here is a clue to just what the hell they were up to as a collective in the three-year interim between LPs. In that span Krallice trimmed down compositions and packed them full of riffs"

Writing for Bearded Gentlemen Music, Cody Davis commented: "Krallice are masterminds of metal and some of the most forward-thinking musicians around. With the quality of music this group produces, it is easy to understand the fervor that surrounds something like Hyperion. Krallice does not miss. Another release, another stirring success."

In an article for Echoes and Dust, Martyn Coppack remarked: "Really it's the true mastery of music that wins in the end... On hearing this it's hard to think of another black metal band so proficient at twisting the nerve endings as they expand on the black metal palette."

A reviewer for The Toilet Ov Hell stated: "It’s good. Very good. Hyperion takes account of its short time budget to bring all of the very best elements that make this band matter to the fore... Hyperion is one hell of an introduction to 2016."

== Track listing ==
No.	Title	Lyrics	Music	Length
1.	"Hyperion"	Barr, McMaster	Barr	7:27
2.	"The Guilt of Time"	Barr	Barr	6:10
3.	"Assuming Memory"	Barr, McMaster	Marston	10:16
Total length:				23:52

== Personnel ==
- Colin Marston - guitar, production
- Mick Barr - vocals, guitar
- Nicholas McMaster - bass guitar, vocals
- Lev Weinstein - drums
