= Colored Sands =

Studio album by Gorguts
- Released: August 6, 2013; September 3, 2013
- Genres: Technical death metal; avant-garde metal
- Length: 62:51
- Label: Season of Mist
- Producers: Colin Marston; Luc Lemay

Gorguts chronology
| From Wisdom to Hate (2001) | Colored Sands (2013) | Pleiades' Dust (2016) |

Colored Sands is the fifth full-length album by Canadian technical death metal band Gorguts. It is Gorguts' first studio album since 2001's From Wisdom to Hate. The album features the band's first recordings with guitarist Kevin Hufnagel and bassist Colin Marston, and the band's only recordings with drummer John Longstreth. It is a concept album based on Tibet. The album was released digitally on August 6, 2013, and the release of the CD and vinyl versions on September 3, 2013.

== Background ==
Luc Lemay joined Negativa with Steeve Hurdle after Gorguts disbanded in 2005, but felt uncomfortable with the improvisational elements in that band's music. At Hurdle's recommendation, Lemay reformed Gorguts in summer 2008 to prepare for the twentieth anniversary of Gorguts' 1989 formation. As Lemay recollected, "When Steeve brought the idea to me to make a new record to celebrate the 20th anniversary of the band, I'd never thought about it before. I was very happy with everything the band had accomplished in the past and I had no intention of making a new record. Then, when I started to write, I had no apprehensions either...I just went with the flow and wrote the music I wanted to hear".

Lemay pursued drummer John Longstreth after being impressed with his performance on Dim Mak's album Knives of Ice. Longstreth and Lemay began rehearsing in early 2009. Lemay had previously met Colin Marston at a Negativa show in Montreal and originally wanted him to play guitar in the reformed Gorguts; however, Hurdle recommended Kevin Hufnagel as a potential guitarist, and Lemay agreed that his playing was impressive. Marston and Hufnagel both agreed to join the group, with Marston on bass instead of guitar. Lemay has confirmed that his collaboration with Marston and Hufnagel – who are also classically trained musicians – were critical to the composition of Colored Sands:

They are amazing players, and they have training themselves, as well. When we work on arrangements together, we can go into very micro-detail, like in doing composition on a sheet of paper, and we can understand each other's minds and very specific ideas in words by using an academic vocabulary. Colin's a big fan of those very modern American composers, like Elliott Carter, which is super complex music, and he listens to that like every day. It's the first time that I have [with me] someone writing extreme music and death metal, and we can share on Bartok and appreciate it.

== Musical style and concept ==
Lemay placed Colored Sands in the context of Gorguts previous work by explaining that, beginning with Obscura, the band "deliberately made an effort to not do such things as the fast Slayer beats, no more fast picking riffs and other ideas found on our second album The Erosion of Sanity". This prompted the band to develop what Lemay described as "a new musical language" that was first heard on Obscura. However, Lemay noted that Obscura was essentially a "first draft of this new language", for which "the outcome is somewhat simplistic". Lemay viewed From Wisdom to Hate and Colored Sands as more sophisticated expressions of the "musical language" developed by Gorguts.

The songs on Colored Sands were written by Lemay (with the exception of "Forgotten Arrows", written by Marston, and "Absconders", written by Hufnagel), but the other band members composed most of their own parts. Inspired by Opeth and the album The Incident by Porcupine Tree, Lemay intended to write more progressive songs with longer running times and more dynamics. Lemay described the album as having more of a "soundtrack approach" that, while containing the essential ingredients of Obscura and From Wisdom to Hate, differed in how it was composed and arranged. As he explained, "I think we took more time to say things musically on this record; not that we were in a rush on the other records, but the songs were shorter....With this one, it breathes more".

The album's concept was inspired by Lemay's viewing of a child's drawing of a Tibetan sand mandala, which is a symbol made of colored sand that is ritualistically destroyed once it has been constructed. Lemay confirmed that the album's title alludes to sand mandalas. Lemay explained that, while he initially considered writing an album entirely based upon the sand mandala, he later expanded to focus upon Tibetan culture, geography, and history. Lemay explained that it was intent to "create a storytelling mood within the music; sort of like motion picture music". Lemay referred to Tibet as "the canvas for the music" in which the first four songs discuss "the splendours of the country, the culture, the topography, the geography", and the last four refer to "the country being invaded, people protesting through immolation, people getting killed trying to escape"; the song "Absconders" is based on Jonathan Green's book Murder in the High Himalaya about the Nangpa La shooting incident, and quotes the book with Green's permission.

The transition between the first four songs and the last four is an orchestral piece, "The Battle of Chamdo", which refers to the invasion of Tibet by China. The piece was written by Lemay on piano and recorded with a string quintet. Compared to classical composers Shostakovitch and Penderecki (which has been acknowledged and affirmed by Lemay), the song represents a critical turning point in the album concept, according to Lemay: "The topic of this song, the Chinese invasion of 1950, is the most important thing that happened to this country [Tibet]...so the instrumentation is different – it's striking". He further explained how "The Battle of Chamdo" served as the watershed of Colored Sands:

The orchestral piece is very important on the record because it divides the concept in two because the first four songs are about the beauty of the philosophy and the landscape and the beauty of those people's culture and everything which is very positive and then you get the orchestral piece which illustrates the Chinese invasion of 1950...So that's why the opening rhythm is a very military, very war-like rhythm, you know? And then that's where the misery strikes Tibet in this music.

The album concept ultimately concludes, on "Reduced to Silence", with Lemay's consideration of non-violence as it relates to Tibetan history and the preservation of a threatened culture:

The last song, "Reduced to Silence," is about questioning the non-violence philosophy which is in the heart of the Tibetan philosophy. But did it really help them in the long run? That's what I question. If you wish love and peace to your enemies and then the other way they put you in prison and torture you and they're in the way of [continued survival] at some point...The Tibetan culture is, in the long run...I would doubt they’re gonna last for another hundred years. So that's the concept.

Lemay later said that he did not understand human nature as it related to the tragedies inflicted upon the Tibetan people. "I don’t understand why any man on earth would have the tiniest bit of anger toward the Tibetan people. They've been pacific people for centuries; owning an army did not seem to be a priority in their values since they're not interested in the concepts of jealousy, domination, [or] megalomania". However, he wondered, "did their non-violent philosophy serve and help their cause? I don't think so..." The lack of intervention by the world powers was also criticized by Lemay: "The whole world knows Tibet and Tibetan culture is very non-threatening, but nobody puts a real foot down to help them and get the Chinese out of there. The title comes from how I was seeing the ground coloured by suffering".

== Artwork ==
The album cover and interior artwork features paintings by Martin Lacroix. The paintings were completed in close collaboration with Luc Lemay. While Lemay affirmed that he had a "very clear vision" for how each illustration would tell a story, he admitted surprise at how Lacroix's creative choices for the cover ultimately embodied his vision:

I knew for a long time that I wanted to put more focus on the position of the hands. Hands are very expressive and they're able to get the message across very easily without the use of words. So I knew that I wanted to have the "praying hands" and the "tied hands" together in the same picture. I could never figure out a way to make them work efficiently. Then Martin came up with the idea of the two pairs of hands coming out of the same figure. I loved that idea! I think this was a very strong statement. There was no need to put more elements because everything which I required was there! We can easily see each aspect of the whole concept in one single picture.

Lemay noted that Tibetan scriptures written alongside the titles in the booklet are, in fact, direct translations of the titles that were provided by a Montreal resident.

== Release ==
A rough instrumental demo of "Enemies of Compassion" was previewed on the band's Myspace page in 2011. Prior to the album's release, the songs "Forgotten Arrows" and "An Ocean of Wisdom" were made available for online streaming. As a response to the album leaking onto file sharing sites in July 2013, Season of Mist released a digital version of the album on August 6, nearly a month ahead of the scheduled release date. The CD and vinyl versions were released on September 3, 2013.

== Critical reception ==
Professional ratings
Aggregate scores
| Source | Rating |
|---|---|
| Metacritic | 81/100 |
Review scores
| Source | Rating |
| Decibel Magazine | 9/10 |
| Exclaim! | 10/10 |
| MetalSucks | 4/5 stars |
| The New York Times | mixed |
| Pitchfork | 8.2/10 |
| Sputnikmusic | 4.7/5 |

According to Metacritic, Colored Sands has received "universal acclaim". Decibel Magazine's Chris Dick proclaimed Colored Sands a leap beyond "mere tech-death metal" that is "new, fresh and expectedly challenging". Writing for Pitchfork, Hank Shteamer enthused over the album's "breathtaking detail and scope" which imbued the album with a "vast dynamic range. On one hand, it contains some of the thorniest, most aggressive death metal ever issued under the Gorguts name; on the other, it includes moments of stunning textural beauty". Sputnikmusic's Sobhi Youssef viewed the album as a continuation of the experimentation heard on From Wisdom to Hate, noting that Colored Sands "brings even more ideas to the table" without departing from the band's "trademark dissonance-come-insanity", which "is fused in the very fabric of each section, lending a dose of controlled chaos to the near classical designs and atmospheric build-up of Colored Sands". Denise Falzon, writing for Exclaim!, awarded the album a perfect score and praised the "impeccable" musicianship directed towards elaborating "the more progressive and experimental side of the group". Sammy O'Hagar of MetalSucks also praised Gorguts for maintaining its distinctive core while presenting an album that sounds "very different" from the rest of its discography. However, the album did draw qualified criticism, with Ben Ratliffe of The New York Times opining that, unlike Obscura's sense of "nearly constant surprise", Colored Sands is "frustratingly consistent in its overall dark, dense, misty color and atmosphere... It goes all over the place according to the dictates of Gorguts’ own style, but remains rooted to the spot".

The album is a longlisted nominee for the 2014 Polaris Music Prize.

== Track listing ==
All tracks are written by Luc Lemay, except where noted.

| No. | Title | Music | Length |
|---|---|---|---|
| 1. | "Le Toit du Monde" | | 6:33 |
| 2. | "An Ocean of Wisdom" | | 7:21 |
| 3. | "Forgotten Arrows" | Colin Marston | 5:41 |
| 4. | "Colored Sands" | | 7:55 |
| 5. | "The Battle of Chamdo" (instrumental) | | 4:43 |
| 6. | "Enemies of Compassion" | | 7:03 |
| 7. | "Ember's Voice" | | 6:48 |
| 8. | "Absconders" | Kevin Hufnagel | 9:09 |
| 9. | "Reduced to Silence" | | 7:38 |
| Total length: | | | 62:51 |

== Credits ==
=== Personnel ===
- Luc Lemay – vocals, guitar
- Kevin Hufnagel – guitar
- Colin Marston – bass guitar
- John Longstreth – drums

=== Additional personnel ===
- Joshua Modney – violin on "The Battle of Chamdo"
- Emily Holden – violin on "The Battle of Chamdo"
- Victor Lowre – viola on "The Battle of Chamdo"
- Isabel Castellvi – cello on "The Battle of Chamdo"
- Gregory Chudzik – bass on "The Battle of Chamdo"

=== Production ===
- Pierre Remillard – engineering, production
- Martin Brunet – engineering, production
- Colin Marston – production, mixing, mastering, and additional recording of string orchestra, vocals, additional guitar and drums
- Martin Lacroix – cover and layout illustrations
- Luc Lemay – production
