= From Wisdom to Hate =

Studio album by Gorguts
- Released: March 6, 2001
- Recorded: June 2000
- Genres: Technical death metal; avant-garde metal
- Length: 40:41
- Labels: Olympic, Season of Mist, Century Media
- Producers: Gorguts, Pierre Rémillard

Gorguts chronology
Obscura (1998)	From Wisdom to Hate (2001)	Colored Sands (2013)

Professional ratings
Review scores
Source	Rating
AllMusic	4/5 stars

From Wisdom to Hate is the fourth album by Gorguts, released on March 6, 2001 through Olympic Recordings and Season of Mist. The musical style can be considered a compromise between the previous album Obscura and the older albums Considered Dead and The Erosion of Sanity. This is the only Gorguts album to feature drummer Steve MacDonald. MacDonald had a history of recurrent depression and committed suicide in 2002, which eventually led to the break-up of Gorguts in 2005.

Steeve Hurdle went on to form Negativa, which Lemay joined at Hurdle's invitation in 2006. Luc Lemay reformed Gorguts in 2008 with a new lineup and released a new album entitled Colored Sands in 2013.

== Release history ==
The record label War on Music reissued the album on vinyl in 2011.

Century Media reissued the album in 2015 with expanded liner notes by Luc Lemay on vinyl and CD along with Obscura.

== Musical style and writing ==
The album's style has been described as somewhere between Obscura and the band's first two albums. According to AllMusic's William York, "In the end, From Wisdom to Hate may not have the same epic scope or crazed intensity as Obscura but, by taking that album's experimentation and fitting it into a (relatively) more straightforward setting, it is certainly more approachable." Pitchfork's Hank Shteamer wrote that on From Wisdom to Hate, "Luc Lemay streamlined Obscura's demented sprawl, yielding a less outlandish yet equally distinguished statement."

"To choose a word to describe the whole album, I would choose antiquity. That is just a start, but it is a good word as two of the songs on this disc deal with the Middle Ages epoch. But all of the other songs are related to the discovery of Mesopotamia and the cultures that made up the cradle of civilization. Where all of the knowledge of mathematics, science and architecture came from. There is a lot to say about it all and it really was a lot of hard work to make sure we got it right. In the layout for the record you'll see I took time to write a prologue to each song so people would know what it was about."

Lemay explained in an interview that the opening track 'Inverted' presented a compositional challenge to him at the time of writing the album. "I got stuck on the middle slow parts for months…and then I was explaining to Dan [Mongrain, FWTH guitarist] what I was picturing, without being able to put my finger on it. Dan played something on a specific rhythm I explained him, and from there everything got clear! I finished the song in a snap."

== Track listing ==
All lyrics are written by Luc Lemay.

No.	Title	Music	Length
1.	"Inverted"	Lemay	4:23
2.	"Behave Through Mythos"	Cloutier	5:10
3.	"From Wisdom to Hate"	Mongrain, Cloutier	5:06
4.	"The Quest for Equilibrium"	Lemay	6:47
5.	"Unearthing the Past"	Mongrain	5:02
6.	"Elusive Treasures"	Cloutier, Mongrain	6:19
7.	"Das Martyrium Des"	Lemay, Mongrain	4:33
8.	"Testimonial Ruins"	Mongrain, Lemay	3:19
Total length:			40:41

== Personnel ==
Adapted from AllMusic credits.

- Luc Lemay – guitars, vocals, assistant engineer, logo design
- Daniel Mongrain – lead guitar
- Steve Cloutier – bass guitar
- Steve MacDonald – drums
- Pierre Rémillard – engineering, mixing, production
- Louis Legault – engineer
