= Ygg huur =

Album by Krallice

Studio album by Krallice
- Released: July 30, 2015
- Recorded: July 4–8, 2015
- Venue: Menegroth, The Thousand Caves Studio
- Genre: Black metal, technical death metal, avant-garde metal
- Length: 35:29
- Label: Hathenter (CD); Gilead Media (LP); Avantgarde Music (European CD); Daymare Recordings (Japanese CD)
- Producer: Colin Marston

Krallice chronology
Years Past Matter (2012)	Ygg huur (2015)	Hyperion (2016)

Ygg huur is the fifth studio album by the American black metal band Krallice. The album was recorded between July 4 and 8 at Menegroth, The Thousand Caves Studio and was self-released digitally by the band on July 30, 2015, with physical versions released in September. The album received widespread critical acclaim for its dense, complex songwriting and unique sound, featuring on a number of end-of-year lists by music publications.

== Musical style and writing ==
Ygg huur has a highly technical, dense and complex style of metal, that has been described as "[branching] out kaleidoscopically, intricate riffs alternate frantically, from insanely fast tremolos to dissonant squeals, and rhythms float and bounce spastically without any anchors". Though it is rooted in black metal, some music critics have noted the influence of death metal on the album, and comparisons have been made to Gorguts, Deathspell Omega, and Altar of Plagues.

In an interview, Mick Barr said, "Our method for writing music has remained more or less unchanged since the first album. One of the three song writers will bring forth a song structure and the others will write their parts to it, then we collectively work on it as a band until it feels more or less complete. Or until it is time to record the album, in which case we just go for it, and hope we can make it feel finished in the moment."

== Reception ==
Professional ratings
Review scores
Source	Rating
Pitchfork	8.2/10
Spin	8/10
Sputnikmusic	3.5/5

=== Critical reception ===
The album generally received positive reviews. Pitchfork was positive in its assessment of the album, writing, "Ygg Huur is more vivid, vexing, and meticulous than most of what the band's old peers still call black metal—a sentence Krallice no longer need to share." The Spin critic Colin Joyce described the album as "the band’s most outwardly tortured material since their 2008 debut, when their take on black metal structures was still relatively straightforward." Joyce added, "They’re all the way through the looking glass on this one, presenting a knobbly vision of the genre that stems and branches out like a particularly warped weeping willow, but given the opiated grandeur of what came between this is a particularly oxygenated version of their blown-out screams and squelches." Sputnikmusic staff writer Elijah K. wrote, "The result is truly interesting metal record that mixes a flurry of modern influences into one tight little package." He concluded that "for major detractors Ygg Huur is well worth looking into."

=== Accolades ===
Publication	Award	Rank
Pitchfork	Best Metal Albums of 2015	Honourable mention
MetalSucks	Dave Mustein's Top Fifteen Metal Albums of 2015	3
Spin	The 20 Best Metal Albums of 2015	2
Spin	Colin Joyce's 25 Best Albums of 2015	8
Spin	The 50 Best Albums of 2015	44
Stereogum	The 50 Best Metal Albums of 2015	8

== Track listing ==
No.	Title	Lyrics	Music	Length
1.	"Idols"	McMaster	McMaster	3:08
2.	"Wastes of Ocean"	McMaster	Marston	6:41
3.	"Over Spirit"	Barr	Barr	6:41
4.	"Tyranny of Thought"	Weinstein	Marston	6:41
5.	"Bitter Meditation"	Barr	Barr	6:41
6.	"Engram"	McMaster	McMaster	5:37
7.	"Trippin' Balls" (Japanese edition bonus track)		Jasta 14	0:54

== Personnel ==
- Mick Barr - guitar, vocals (2, 3, 4, 5)
- Colin Marston - guitar
- Lev Weinstein - drums
- Nicholas McMaster - bass guitar, vocals (1, 6)
