= Fever Kingdoms =

EP by Pyrrhon
- Released: October 26, 2010
- Recorded: August 2009
- Studio: Bad Lab Studios, Tabernacle, NJ
- Genre: Technical death metal, mathcore
- Length: 21:31
- Label: Path Less Traveled

Pyrrhon chronology
Fever Kingdoms (2010)	An Excellent Servant But a Terrible Master (2011)

Fever Kingdoms is an EP by the heavy metal band Pyrrhon. It was released on October 26, 2010 on Path Less Traveled Records.

== Track listing ==
All lyrics are written by Doug Moore; all music is composed by Pyrrhon.

No.	Title	Length
1.	"King of All Tears"	3:27
2.	"Biblioclast Waltz"	4:01
3.	"God's Parabola"	5:44
4.	"Baudelaire"	4:02
5.	"Pascal's Wager"	4:17

== Personnel ==
Adapted from the Fever Kingdoms liner notes.

Pyrrhon

- Alex Cohen – drums
- Dylan DiLella – electric guitar
- Doug Moore – vocals
- Mike Sheen – bass guitar

Production and additional personnel

- Caroline Harrison – cover art, design
- Colin Marston – mastering
- Dan Pilla – recording, mixing

== Release history ==
Region	Date	Label	Format	Catalog
United States	2010	The Path Less Traveled	CD	PLT014
