= Goldstar (album) =

Studio album by Imperial Triumphant
- Released: March 21, 2025
- Studio: Menegroth Studios
- Genre: Avant-garde metal; blackened death metal
- Length: 38:15
- Label: Century Media
- Producer: Colin Marston

Imperial Triumphant chronology
Vile Luxury (Redux 1924) (2024)	Goldstar (2025)	Imprints of Man (2025)

Singles from Goldstar
- 1. "Eye of Mars" Released: September 19, 2024; 2. "Hotel Sphinx" Released: November 13, 2024; 3. "Lexington Delirium" Released: January 16, 2025; 4. "Pleasuredome" Released: February 12, 2025

Goldstar is the sixth studio album by American avant-garde metal band Imperial Triumphant. It was released on March 21, 2025 through Century Media Records.

== Background ==
In 2024, Imperial Triumphant released the album's first two singles, "Eye of Mars" on September 19 and "Hotel Sphinx" on November 13. The release of "Hotel Sphinx" coincided with the announcement of their sixth album, Goldstar, which would be released in March 2025. On January 16, 2025, the band released the third single "Lexington Delirium", featuring Tomas Haake of Meshuggah, along with revealing more details about Goldstar. "Pleasuredome" featuring Dave Lombardo and Meshuggah's Tomas Haake was released on February 12, 2025.

Goldstar was recorded at Colin Marston's Menegroth Studios in New York City for five days, the last album to do so before the studio's closure.

== Touring ==
Imperial Triumphant began touring in 2025 to support the album starting with the Decibel Magazine Tour, which took place in March and April. In April 2025, they announced the dates for European part of the Goldstar World Tour.

== Reception ==
Goldstar ratings
Review scores
Source	Rating
Angry Metal Guy	4.5/5
Distorted Sound	8/10
Kerrang!	4/5
The Needle Drop	9/10
New Noise Magazine	5/5 stars

Goldstar received positive critical reviews upon release, and was listed on several year end lists. Metal Injection ranked it as the 6th best album of 2025, and Decibel and Metal Hammer both ranked it as the 13th best album of the year. Loudwire included the album in their list of the best rock and metal albums of 2025.

== Track listing ==
All tracks are written by Imperial Triumphant.

No.	Title	Length
1.	"Eye of Mars"	5:07
2.	"Gomorrah Nouveaux"	4:34
3.	"Lexington Delirium"	4:34
4.	"Hotel Sphinx"	4:49
5.	"NEWYORKCITY"	0:47
6.	"Goldstar"	0:54
7.	"Rot Moderne"	4:35
8.	"Pleasuredome"	5:35
9.	"Industry of Misery"	7:20
Total length:		37:15

== Personnel ==
Imperial Triumphant

- Zachary Ezrin – vocals, guitars, orchestration
- Kenny Grohowski – drums
- Steve Blanco – bass, keyboards, piano, vocals

Additional personnel

- Tomas Haake – backing vocals (3, 8)
- Yoshiko Ohara – backing vocals (5)
- Dave Lombardo – drums (8)

Production

- Zbigniew Bielak – cover art
- Colin Marston – production, recording, mixing
- Arthur Rizk – mastering
