= Vile Luxury =

2018 studio album by Imperial Triumphant

Studio album by Imperial Triumphant
- Released: July 13, 2018
- Studio: Menegroth Studios
- Genres: Avant-garde metal; blackened death metal; jazz fusion
- Length: 55:59
- Label: Gilead Media
- Producer: Colin Marston

Imperial Triumphant chronology
Abyssal Gods (2015)	Vile Luxury (2018)	Alphaville (2020)

Vile Luxury is the third studio album by American avant-garde metal band Imperial Triumphant. It was released on July 13, 2018, through Gilead Media. The album was recorded at Colin Marston's Menegroth Studios in New York City.

== Touring ==
Following the release of the studio album Vile Luxury, Imperial Triumphant embarked on their first European tour in April 2019, including a show at Roadburn Festival. This was followed by further European dates in November 2019, including headlining the 'Cult Never Dies Stage' at Damnation Festival in Leeds, UK.

== Reception ==
Angry Metal Guy awarded the album a "great" score of 4.5/5, calling it "ugly but regal, diseased and extravagant." Metal Injection gave it a score of 8.5/10.

== Track listing ==
No.	Title	Length
1.	"Swarming Opulence"	6:25
2.	"Lower World"	6:35
3.	"Gotham Luxe"	8:08
4.	"Chernobyl Blues"	7:41
5.	"Cosmopolis"	7:55
6.	"Mother Machine"	4:12
7.	"The Filth"	9:22
8.	"Luxury in Death"	5:41
Total length:		55:59

== Personnel ==
Imperial Triumphant

- Zachary Ezrin – vocals, guitars
- Kenny Grohowski – drums
- Steve Blanco – bass, vocals, keyboards

Guest and session musicians

- Will Smith – vocals (track 3)
- Yoshiko Ohara – vocals (tracks 3, 7, 8)
- Andromeda Anarchia – vocals (track 7)
- Sarai Chrzanowski – vocals (track 2)
- J. Walter Hawkes – trombone
- Joe Beaty – trombone
- Ben Hankle – trumpet
- Jonathan Powell – trumpet
- Dan Peck – tuba

Production

- Colin Marston – production, mixing, mastering, engineering
- Andrew Tremblay – artwork, design

== Vile Luxury (Redux 1924) ==
Vile Luxury (Redux 1924)

Studio album (reissue) by Imperial Triumphant
- Released: May 3, 2024
- Studio: Menegroth Studios
- Genres: Avant-garde metal; blackened death metal; jazz fusion
- Length: 56:31
- Label: Century Media Records
- Producer: Colin Marston

Imperial Triumphant chronology
Spirit of Ecstasy (2022)	Vile Luxury (Redux 1924) (2024)	Goldstar (2025)

Vile Luxury (Redux 1924) is the reissue of Vile Luxury, released on May 3, 2024 via Century Media Records, with brand new artwork. Like the original Vile Luxury, the album was recorded at Colin Marston's Menegroth Studios in New York City.

No.	Title	Length
1.	"Swarming Opulence"	6:25
2.	"Lower World"	6:35
3.	"Gotham Luxe"	8:08
4.	"Chernobyl Blues"	7:41
5.	"Cosmopolis"	7:55
6.	"Mother Machine"	4:12
7.	"The Filth"	9:22
8.	"Luxury in Death"	6:13
Total length:		56:31
