= The Mother of Virtues =

Studio album by Pyrrhon
- Released: April 1, 2014
- Recorded: May – June 2013
- Studio: Saint Vitus Bar and The Sound City, Brooklyn, NY
- Genre: Technical death metal
- Length: 54:33
- Label: Relapse

Pyrrhon chronology
An Excellent Servant But a Terrible Master (2011)	The Mother of Virtues (2014)	Growth Without End (2015)

Professional ratings
Review scores
Source	Rating
Pitchfork Media	(7.7/10)
Metal Hammer	4/5 stars

The Mother of Virtues is the second studio album by Pyrrhon, released on April 1, 2014, by Relapse Records.

== Track listing ==
All lyrics are written by Doug Moore; all music is composed by Pyrrhon.

No.	Title	Length
1.	"The Oracle of Nassau"	1:25
2.	"White Flag"	9:42
3.	"Sleeper Agent"	4:04
4.	"Balkanized"	4:46
5.	"Eternity in a Breath"	8:16
6.	"Implant Fever"	4:33
7.	"Invisible Injury"	6:54
8.	"The Parasite in Winter"	4:17
9.	"The Mother of Virtues"	10:36

== Personnel ==
Adapted from The Mother of Virtues liner notes.

Pyrrhon

- Alex Cohen – drums
- Dylan DiLella – electric guitar
- Erik Malave – bass guitar
- Doug Moore – vocals

Production and additional personnel

- Caroline Harrison – cover art, design
- Ryan Jones – recording, mixing
- Colin Marston – mastering

== Release history ==
Region	Date	Label	Format	Catalog
United States	2014	Relapse	CD, LP	RR7256
