= What Passes for Survival =

Studio album by Pyrrhon
- Released: August 11, 2017
- Recorded: March – April 2017
- Studio: The Thousand Caves (Woodhaven, NY)
- Genre: Technical death metal
- Length: 45:20
- Label: Willowtip

Pyrrhon chronology
Running Out of Skin (2016)	What Passes for Survival (2017)

What Passes for Survival is the third studio album by Pyrrhon, released on April 1, 2017 by Willowtip Records.

== Critical reception ==
Professional ratings
Review scores
Source	Rating
PopMatters	9/10 stars
Sputnikmusic	3/5 stars
Angry Metal Guy	5/5 stars

Reception towards the album was fairly positive. Spyros Stasis for PopMatters called the album "the apex moment for Pyrhhon" and that "even though the leap forward is not as substantial as it was from debut to sophomore records, the band is still able to improve further, displaying a clearer vision and highlighting more clearly the intricacies of its sound." George Parr for Astral Noize stated that the band "continues to flaunt its avant-garde extremity on their third LP, taking maniacal twists and turns, ever adapting but always remaining an aurally challenging style oozing with unparalleled ferocity." Clavier for Sputnikmusic stated that the album "pushes compositional anarchy to its limits, engaging in an extremely loose structuring of its tracks on both a macro and micro level" but criticized the album for being repetitive at times. Dan Obstkrieg for Your Last Rites stated the album "reinforces the notion that music, like language, like life, makes marks directly on bodies" as well calling it their most diverse outing to date.

== Track listing ==
All lyrics are written by Doug Moore; all music is composed by Pyrrhon.

No.	Title	Length
1.	"The Happy Victim's Creed"	5:03
2.	"The Invisible Hand Holds a Whip"	3:35
3.	"Goat Mockery Ritual"	5:35
4.	"Tennessee"	7:47
5.	"Trash Talk Landfill"	6:04
6.	"The Unraveling I: Hegemony of Grasping Fears"	2:28
7.	"The Unraveling II: Free at Last"	1:29
8.	"The Unraveling III: Live From the Fresh Corpse"	1:17
9.	"Empty Tenement Spirit"	12:04

== Personnel ==
Adapted from What Passes for Survival liner notes.

Pyrrhon

- Dylan DiLella – electric guitar
- Erik Malave – bass guitar
- Doug Moore – vocals
- Steve Schwegler – drums

Production and additional personnel

- Caroline Harrison – cover art, design
- Colin Marston – recording, mixing, mastering

== Release history ==
Region	Date	Label	Format	Catalog
United States	2017	Willowtip	CD	BWR001
United States	2017	Throatruiner	LP	THRT064
