= Alphaville (album) =

Studio album by Imperial Triumphant
- Released: July 31, 2020
- Recorded: December 2019
- Studio: Menegroth Studios
- Genres: Avant-garde metal; blackened death metal; jazz fusion
- Length: 49:49
- Label: Century Media
- Producers: Trey Spruance; Colin Marston

Imperial Triumphant chronology
Vile Luxury (2018)	Alphaville (2020)	Spirit of Ecstasy (2022)

Singles from Alphaville
- 1. "Rotted Futures" Released: May 29, 2020; 2. "City Swine" Released: July 3, 2020; 3. "Atomic Age" Released: July 17, 2020

Alphaville is the fourth studio album by American avant-garde metal band Imperial Triumphant. It was released on July 31, 2020, through Century Media Records. The album was recorded at Colin Marston's Menegroth Studios in New York City.

== Background ==
In an interview with Echoes and Dust, vocalist and guitarist Zachary Ezrin stated about the recording process "It was a different process for every single song. We started writing in 2018 and every song has a different story basically." Later in the interview, Ezrin talked about the inspiration behind the title of the album, "The name Alphaville comes from the 1965 film by Jean-Luc Godard by the same name and in addition to the content, which was a big inspiration to us. The actual literal name of Alphaville is French for number one city which was a huge inspiration to us because we felt, even though the film takes place in Paris, this kind of a mentality also applies to the New York state of mind."

In an interview with Revolver, Ezrin stated the album was influenced by Portal, Ornette Coleman, Cannibal Corpse, Duke Ellington, and Metallica. Ezrin's birthplace of Manhattan was also an influence on the music of the album, with him stating "I hear so much music in the sound of the city, I can get inspired by the sound of a subway train on the tracks."

Tomas Haake of Meshuggah plays taiko drums on the track "City Swine".

== Musical style ==
The album has been described as avant-garde metal, blackened death metal, and jazz fusion.

== Reception ==
Alphaville received critical acclaim upon release. Angry Metal Guy awarded it a "great" score of 4.0/5 and stated "Between the fluid transitions between songs, the various head-jerking moments littered throughout, and the sheer level of musicianship on display by all involved, Alphaville showcases just what Imperial is capable of." Max Heilman of Metal Injection gave it a score of 9/10 and wrote "This album presents rarified, uninhibited, experimental metal in its most confrontational form. Nonetheless, it’s hard to resist multiple listens." Gary Alcock of Ghost Cult Magazine described it as "A breathtaking vision of inescapable claustrophobia and unrestrained pandemonium, 2020 has its very own soundtrack, and its name is Alphaville."

Alphaville appeared on multiple year-end lists. Revolver named it the 25th best album of 2020. Metal Hammer named it the 10th best album of 2020.

== Track listing ==
No.	Title	Length
1.	"Rotted Futures"	5:59
2.	"Excelsior"	5:52
3.	"City Swine"	6:56
4.	"Atomic Age"	8:43
5.	"Transmission to Mercury"	6:41
6.	"Alphaville"	8:09
7.	"The Greater Good"	7:22
Total length:		49:49

Bonus Tracks Edition
No.	Title	Length
8.	"Experiment (Voivod cover)"	4:48
9.	"Happy Home (The Residents cover)"	4:48
Total length:		59:25

== Personnel ==
Imperial Triumphant

- Zachary Ilya Ezrin – vocals, guitar
- Steve Blanco – bass, vocals, piano, mellotron, synthesizer, taiko
- Kenny Grohowski – drums, taiko

Additional personnel

- Trey Spruance – sampling, mastering, production
- Sarai Chrzanowski – choir ("Rotted Futures", "Alphaville")
- Tomas Haake – taiko ("City Swine")
- Yoshiko Ohara – choir ("Atomic Age", "The Greater Good")
- R.K. Halvørson – vocals ("Atomic Age")
- Andromeda Anarchia – choir ("Transmission to Mercury", "Happy Home")
- J. Walter Hawkes – trombone ("Transmission to Mercury")
- Colin Marston – guitar ("Experiment"), mixing, mastering, production
- Phlegeton – vocals ("Experiment")
- Zbigniew Bielak – artwork
