= Growth Without End =

EP by Pyrrhon
- Released: June 2, 2015
- Genre: Technical death metal, mathcore
- Length: 14:48
- Label: Handshake Inc.

Pyrrhon chronology
The Mother of Virtues (2014)	Growth Without End (2015)	Running Out of Skin (2016)

Growth Without End is an EP by Pyrrhon, released on June 2, 2015, by Handshake Inc.

== Track listing ==
All lyrics are written by Doug Moore; all music is composed by Pyrrhon.

Side one
No.	Title	Length
1.	"Cancer Mantra"	2:07
2.	"Forget Yourself"	1:20
3.	"The Mass"	3:51

Side two
No.	Title	Length
1.	"Viral Content"	2:52
2.	"Turing's Revenge"	4:38

== Personnel ==
Adapted from the Growth Without End liner notes.

Pyrrhon

- Alex Cohen – drums
- Dylan DiLella – electric guitar
- Erik Malave – bass guitar
- Doug Moore – vocals

Production and additional personnel

- Caroline Harrison – cover art, design
- Ryan Jones – recording, mixing
- Colin Marston – mastering

== Release history ==
Region	Date	Label	Format	Catalog
United States	2015	Handshake Inc.	CD, LP	HILP 11B
