= Spirit of Ecstasy (album) =

Studio album by Imperial Triumphant
- Released: July 22, 2022
- Studio: Menegroth Studios
- Genres: Avant-garde metal; blackened death metal; jazz fusion
- Length: 54:45
- Label: Century Media
- Producers: Imperial Triumphant; Colin Marston; Trey Spruance

Imperial Triumphant chronology
Alphaville (2020)	Spirit of Ecstasy (2022)	Vile Luxury (Redux 1924) (2024)

Singles from Spirit of Ecstasy
- 1. "Maximalist Scream" Released: May 20, 2022; 2. "Merkurius Gilded" Released: June 10, 2022; 3. "Tower of Glory, CIty of Shame" Released: July 8, 2022

Spirit of Ecstasy is the fifth studio album by American avant-garde metal band Imperial Triumphant. It was released on July 22, 2022 through Century Media Records.

== Background ==
The album was announced on May 20, 2022, accompanied by the release and music video of the first single, "Maximalist Scream". The title of the album is a reference to the hood ornament on Rolls-Royce vehicles. Vocalist and guitarist Zachary Ezrin stated the album “was inspired by luxury brands like Rolls-Royce and Rolex." He continued, "They’re not just putting out products that are expensive, but ones that are incredibly high-quality in terms of the attention to detail that goes in."

The album features multiple guest musicians, including Voivod's Denis Bélanger, Testament's Alex Skolnick, and Kenny G.

Like its predecessor, the album was recorded at Colin Marston's Menegroth Studios in New York City.

== Musical style ==
The album has been described as avant-garde metal, blackened death metal, and jazz fusion.

== Reception ==
Max Morin of Metal Injection gave the album a score of 7/10 and wrote "It's musically similar to their 2020 breakthrough Alphaville, but with a much more defined sound that gives each instrument room to breathe. It's distinct move away from the buzzy 'trve kvlt' guitar sound of their early releases and it suits Imperial Triumphant just fine." Paul Travers of Kerrang! gave it a score of 3/5 and stated "Spirit Of Ecstasy certainly isn’t an easy listen. There are moments where it seems like they’re trying a little too hard to be different for confrontation’s own sake, but the album succeeds in its own lack of boundaries and utter refusal to compromise."

== Track listing ==
All tracks are written by Imperial Triumphant, except for lyrics in "In the Pleasure of Their Company" by Sasha Davydova.

No.	Title	Length
1.	"Chump Change"	7:49
2.	"Metrovertigo"	6:10
3.	"Tower of Glory, City of Shame"	7:55
4.	"Merkurius Gilded"	6:08
5.	"Death on a Highway"	5:33
6.	"In the Pleasure of Their Company"	6:43
7.	"Bezumnaya"	7:27
8.	"Maximalist Scream"	6:58
Total length:		54:45

== Personnel ==
Imperial Triumphant

- Zachary Ezrin – vocals, guitars, balalaika
- Kenny Grohowski – drums
- Steve Blanco – bass, vocals, keyboards

Additional personnel

- Colin Marston – electronic drums
- Andromeda Anarchia – backing vocals (4)
- Sarai Woods – backing vocals (4, 7)
- Max Gorelick – lead guitar (4)
- Kenny G – soprano saxophone (4)
- Percy Jones – additional bass (6)
- Alex Skolnick – lead guitar (6)
- Trey Spruance – lead guitar (6), strings orchestration and arrangement
- SEVEN)SUNS – strings
- J. Walter Hawkes – trombone (6)
- Benjamin Hankle – trumpet (6)
- Yoshiko Ohara – vocals (3, 7, 8)
- Denis Bélanger – vocals (8)
- Jonas Rolef – spoken word (3)

Production

- Imperial Triumphant – production
- Colin Marston – production, recording, engineering
- Trey Spruance – production, mastering
