= Running Out of Skin =

EP by Pyrrhon
- Released: March 15, 2016
- Recorded: 2015
- Studio: The Thousand Caves (Woodhaven, NY)
- Genre: Technical death metal
- Length: 16:25

Pyrrhon chronology
| Growth Without End (2015) | Running Out of Skin (2016) | What Passes for Survival (2017) |

Running Out of Skin is an EP by Pyrrhon, released independently on March 15, 2016.

== Track listing ==
All lyrics are written by Doug Moore, except "Crystal Mountain" by Chuck Schuldiner; all music is composed by Pyrrhon, except "Crystal Mountain" by Chuck Schuldiner

| No. | Title | Length |
|---|---|---|
| 1. | "Statistic Singular" | 6:30 |
| 2. | "Ashes to Alveoli" | 0:33 |
| 3. | "Motivational Speaker II" | 4:24 |
| 4. | "Crystal Mountain" (Death cover) | 4:58 |

== Personnel ==
Adapted from the Running Out of Skin liner notes.

'Pyrrhon

- Alex Cohen – drums, recording
- Dylan DiLella – electric guitar
- Erik Malave – bass guitar, backing vocals
- Doug Moore – lead vocals

Production and design

- Caroline Harrison – cover art, design
- Colin Marston – mixing, mastering

== Release history ==
| Region | Date | Label | Format | Catalog |
|---|---|---|---|---|
| United States | 2016 | PRC | CD | PRC66 |
