= Kevin Hufnagel =

American musician, based in NYC

- Born: Kevin Hufnagel
- Genres: Progressive rock, Technical metal, Classical, Avant-garde, Experimental, Ambient, Rock/Pop
- Occupations: Musician, guitar teacher, producer
- Instruments: electric guitar, acoustic guitar, baritone ukulele
- Years active: 1994-present
- Labels: Burning Witches; Coup Sur Coup; Handmade Birds; Nightfloat; Nostalgium Directive; Profound Lore; Relapse Records; Season of Mist; Svart; Translation Loss; Wierd Records
- Member of: Byla, Dysrhythmia, Gorguts, Sabbath Assembly, Vaura, Veldune
- Website: kevinhufnagel.bandcamp.com/

Kevin Hufnagel is an American musician, based in New York City. He is known for his solo guitar works, for forming the progressive instrumental rock/metal band Dysrhythmia, and for being a member of Gorguts, Vaura, Sabbath Assembly, Veldune, and Byla. He also is a full time guitar instructor, teaching both in-person and virtually.

== Performance discography ==
=== Byla ===
- 2005: Byla (Translation Loss Records)
- 2007: Byla + Jarboe - Viscera (Translation Loss Records)
- 2009 : Francesco Brunotti/Various Artists - Nocturne (Persistencebit Records) (contributes the track "Bloodrush")

=== Dysrhythmia ===
- 2000: Contradiction (self-released)
- 2001: No Interference (self-released)
- 2001: split 10-inch w/ xthoughtstreamsx (Rice Control Records)
- 2002: split 7-inch w/ Technician (Tranquility Base Records)
- 2003: Pretest (Relapse Records)
- 2004: Live from the Relapse Contamination Festival (Relapse Records)
- 2005: No Interference - reissue with bonus tracks (Translation Loss Records)
- 2006: Barriers and Passages (Relapse Records)
- 2007: Fractures - split CD w/ Rothko (Acerbic Noise Development Records)
- 2009: Psychic Maps (Relapse Records)
- 2012: Test of Submission (Profound Lore Records)
- 2016: The Veil of Control (Profound Lore Records)
- 2019: Terminal Threshold (Translation Loss Records)
- 2024: Coffin of Conviction (Nightfloat Recordings)

=== Gorguts ===
- 2013: Colored Sands (Season of Mist)
- 2016: Pleiades' Dust (Season of Mist)

=== Grey Division Blue ===
- 1994: Departure (self-released)

=== Kevin Hufnagel ===
- 1997: While I Wait (self-released)
- 2009: Songs for the Disappeared (Nightfloat Recordings)
- 2011: Transparencies (Nightfloat Recordings)
- 2012: Polar Night (Nightfloat Recordings-digital)
- 2013: From the 23rd Floor (Abandoned 4-track demos 1996 - 1998 + Live in Baltimore 2008) (Nightfloat Recordings-digital)
- 2013: Ashland (Nightfloat Recordings-digital/Coup sur Coup-cassette)
- 2014: The Murderer's Tracks/The Weather Was Wrong (Nightfloat Recordings-digital)
- 2015: Kleines Biest (Nightfloat Recordings-digital/Handmade Birds-cassette)
- 2015: V/A - And Suddenly Everything, Absolutely Everything, Was There (bandcamp) (contributes the track "Hallucination II")
- 2016: Backwards Through the Maze (Nightfloat Recordings-digital/Nostalgium Directive-cassette)
- 2017: The Protected Shards (Nightfloat Recordings-digital/Coup sur Coup-cassette)
- 2017: Halloween EP 2017 (bandcamp)
- 2017: V/A - Coup Sûr: An Introduction To Coup Sur Coup Records (Coup Sur Coup Records) (contributes the tracks "Ancestral Instinct" and "Ashland")
- 2018: Messages to the Past (Nightfloat Recordings-digital/Translation Loss Records-LP)
- 2018: Halloween EP 2018 (bandcamp)
- 2018: V/A - Feedback Through A Magnifying Glass Volume I (Coup Sur Coup Records) (contributes the track "Final Dawn")
- 2022: Polar Night II (Nightfloat Recordings-digital/Coup sur Coup-cassette)
- 2023: Liaison Dawn (Nightfloat Recordings-digital)
- 2024: Dusting For My Fingerprints (Nightfloat Recordings)

=== Invisible Traces ===
- 2020: Invisible Traces (Nightfloat Recordings-digital)

=== Sabbath Assembly ===
- 2012: Ye Are Gods (Anja Offensive/Svart) (guitar on "We Come From The One")
- 2013: The Four Horsemen 7-inch (Svart)
- 2014: Quaternity (Svart)
- 2014: Eno Ot Derotser cassette (Svart)
- 2015: Sabbath Assembly (Svart)
- 2017: Rites of Passage (Svart)
- 2017: Various Artists - Communion of Saints (Brave Mysteries) (contributes the track "And It Was Dead, Having No Motion (St Peter)")
- 2018: Exsanguinata (original soundtrack) (bandcamp)
- 2019: A Letter of Red (Svart)

=== Vaura ===
- 2012: Selenelion (Wierd Records)
- 2013: The Missing (Profound Lore Records)
- 2019: Sables (Profound Lore Records)
- 2022: Vista of Deviant Anatomies (Primal Architecture Records/Virtues)

=== Veldune ===
- 2022: Veldune (Nightfloat Recordings)

=== Anabiosis ===
- 2018: Submerged Into Scattered Patterns (bandcamp) (additional guitar on "Approaching the Void", "Shore", "Absolute Zero")

=== Artificial Brain ===
- 2026: Antillia (Profound Lore) (guitar solo on "Deciphering the Anachronistic Tongues of the Relic Satellites")

=== Aseitas ===
- 2018: Aseitas (bandcamp) (guitar solo on "City of Stone")

=== The Brazilian Gentleman ===
- 2019: s/t (Lazy Thinking) (baritone ukulele on "Sweep Back Those Leaves (C.A. Mix)")
- 2020: 808 Hymns (Internet and Weed)

=== Costanza ===
- 2008: Sonic Diary (Zerokilled Music) (guitar on "I Am Ready")

=== Didkovsky / Hufnagel / Ulrich / Smith ===
- 2015: Petromyzontiformes Vol 1 (bandcamp) (guitar on "III, for Electric Guitars")

=== Doctor Nerve ===
- 2020: Loud (Punos Music) (guitar solo on "Meta 04 (bonus CD only)")

=== Empty Flowers ===
- 2014: The Air You Found (Translation Loss) (remix/guitar on "Call A Priest")

=== Fear Falls Burning ===
- 2007: Once We All Walk Through Solid Objects (Tonefloat) (guitar on "Fear Falls Burning vs Byla")

=== Feast of the Epiphany ===
- 2023: Significance (Strategy of Tension) (guitar on "Love Dream")

=== Hathenter ===
- 2017: Hathenter Ouija (Hathenter)

=== Honeybloom ===
- 2020: Blooming (Troll Sounds) (guitar solo on "Selfless Warrior")

=== Horror God ===
- 2019: Cursed Seeds (Lavadome Productions) (guitar solo on "They Were Behind Barbed Wire")

=== Howling Sycamore ===
- 2018: Howling Sycamore (Prosthetic Records) (guitar solos on "Upended" and "Midway")
- 2019: Seven Pathways to Annihilation (Prosthetic Records) (guitar solos on "Mastering Fire" and "Initiation")

=== Jarboe ===
- 2008: Mahakali (The End Records)
- 2018: The Cut of the Warrior (Translation Loss Records) (guitar on "Karuna" (Byla mix))

=== The Mirror and The Shadow ===
- 2017: Various Artists - Communion of Saints (Brave Mysteries) (contributes the track "Vox Sanguinis (St Ursula)")

=== Monovoth ===
- 2026: To Live in the Breath of Worship (self-released) (Ebow guitar on "Crimson Red Wound")

=== Moral Collapse ===
- 2021: s/t (Subcontinental Records) (guitar solo on "Suspension of Belief")

=== Sanity Obscure ===
- 2012: Subterranean Constellation (self-released) (guitar solo on "Doublethink")

=== Sculptured ===
- 2021: The Liminal Phase (BMG Records) (trade-off guitar solos on "State of Exception")

=== Svengahli ===
- 2020: Nightmares of Our Own Design (self-released) (guitars on "Nightmares of Our Own Design II (Adrift)")

=== Theta International ===
- 2020: Continual Activation Theory (bandcamp) (guitar solo and additional rhythm guitar on "Sons of Hydra")

=== Wake ===
- 2022: Thought Form Decent (Metal Blade Records) (guitar solo on "Observer to Master", additional guitar on "Pareidolia")

=== Warforged ===
- 2019: I: Voice (The Artisan Era) (guitar solo on "Eat Them While They Sleep")

=== Yellow6 ===
- 2010: Close/r (Editions6)

=== Soundtracks ===
- 2019: Kevin Hufnagel & Natasha Kermani Imitation Girl - Original Motion Picture Soundtrack (Burning Witches Records)
