= An Excellent Servant But a Terrible Master =

Studio album by Pyrrhon
- Released: September 2, 2011
- Recorded: January 2011
- Studio: Bad Lab Studios, Tabernacle, NJ
- Genre: Technical death metal, mathcore
- Length: 45:00
- Label: Selfmadegod

Pyrrhon chronology
Fever Kingdoms (2010)	An Excellent Servant But a Terrible Master (2011)	The Mother of Virtues (2014)

An Excellent Servant But a Terrible Master is the debut studio album of Pyrrhon, released on September 2, 2011 by Selfmadegod.

== Track listing ==
All lyrics are written by Doug Moore; all music is composed by Pyrrhon.

No.	Title	Length
1.	"New Parasite"	7:34
2.	"Glossolalian"	3:13
3.	"Idiot Circles"	4:40
4.	"Correcting a Mistake"	3:21
5.	"Gamma Knife"	4:55
6.	"The Architect Confesses (Spittlestrand Hair)"	4:49
7.	"Flesh Isolation Chamber"	8:24
8.	"A Terrible Master"	8:04

== Personnel ==
Adapted from the An Excellent Servant But a Terrible Master liner notes.

Pyrrhon

- Alex Cohen – drums
- Dylan DiLella – electric guitar
- Erik Malave – bass guitar
- Doug Moore – vocals

Production and additional personnel

- Caroline Harrison – cover art, design
- Colin Marston – mastering
- Dan Pilla – recording, mixing
- Kyle Smith – additional vocals (1)

== Release history ==
Region	Date	Label	Format	Catalog
United States	2011	Selfmadegod	CD	SMG 079
