= Barriers and Passages =

Studio album by Dysrhythmia
- Released: May 2, 2006
- Genre: Progressive rock, math rock
- Length: 36:46
- Label: Relapse

Dysrhythmia chronology
Pretest (2003)	Barriers and Passages (2006)	Psychic Maps (2009)

Barriers and Passages is the fourth album by progressive rock band Dysrhythmia. It is their first to feature bassist Colin Marston.

== Track listing ==
No.	Title	Length
1.	"Pulsar"	1:13
2.	"Appeared At First"	3:06
3.	"Bypass The Solenoid"	3:14
4.	"An Ally To Comprehension"	4:10
5.	"Seal / Breaker / Void"	7:41
6.	"Kamma Niyama"	2:23
7.	"Sleep Decayer"	5:32
8.	"Bus: Terminal"	1:46
9.	"Luminous"	4:25
10.	"Will the Spirit Prevail"	3:16
