= Dimensional Bleedthrough =

Studio album by Krallice
- Released: November 10, 2009
- Genre: Black metal
- Length: 77:13
- Label: Profound Lore (CD); Gilead Media (vinyl)

Krallice chronology
Krallice (2008)	Dimensional Bleedthrough (2009)	Diotima (2011)

Vinyl cover

Dimensional Bleedthrough is the second album by the New York-based experimental black metal band Krallice. The album was first officially mentioned by Profound Lore Records in a mailing list dated August 31, 2009, and via Twitter. This was followed by a premiere on Stereogum with one track available for preview. A double vinyl release was announced on October 14, 2009, to be released by Gilead Media on February 19, 2010, though it was delayed until late May. The album's title song topped NPR's Viking's Choice: Metal And Outer Sound In '09 list.

== Recording ==
The album was recorded, mixed and mastered at Marston's studio "Menegroth, the Thousand Caves" during June and July 2009.

== Release history ==
Date	Label	Format	Catalog	Notes
November 10, 2009	Profound Lore Records	CD	PFL-052	digipak
May 2010	Gilead Media	2xLP	ELD-028	Clear vinyl, 300 copies
May 2010	Gilead Media	2xLP	ELD-028	Black vinyl, 500 copies

== Artwork ==
The CD cover is a collage made by Nick McMaster with one component drawn by Karlynn Holland. Holland also produced additional artwork for the digipak interior. The vinyl artwork is a reinterpretation of the CD cover by Holland and McMaster.

== Reception ==
Professional ratings
Review scores
Source	Rating
About.com	4.5/5 stars
AllMusic	4.5/5 stars
The New York Times	(favorable)
PopMatters	(8/10)
Pitchfork	(8.0/10)

In a review for AllMusic, Phil Freeman wrote: "These songs... combine insanely focused, dual-guitar interplay with individual moments of anthemic power... This music is clearly about driving the listener out of his or her mind and into some sort of state of pure sonic bliss, and Dimensional Bleedthrough succeeds tremendously on that score... This is metal that could appeal to fans of 20th century classical music as much as extreme rock."

Ben Ratliff of The New York Times called the album "excellent," and stated: "this music is well composed... these songs have tons of structure: strategic repetition, moving harmony, sections that develop with new melodic strains. It's way aggressive, but it hasn't closed in on itself."

Writing for PopMatters, Adrien Begrand stated that, in relation to the band's debut album, Dimensional Bleedthrough "feels a lot more a complete band effort as opposed to feeling like merely a project between two prolific guitarists," and noted that it is "fuller, punchier, stronger emphasis on a more sonically rich sound than mere icy atmospherics, with even a touch of death metal creeping in as well."

Pitchfork's Grayson Haver Currin wrote that the album offers "more than the benchmarks of second-wave black metal, or even the shock-and-tone tactics of a lot of noise and industrial acts," and features guitar playing that is "as complex as it is controlled and deliberate."

Casey Boland of Invisible Oranges stated that, with the album, the group has "fulfill[ed] the promise of their debut": "The band offers better riffs, more interesting song construction, fiercer vocals, and more compelling performances all around." He concluded: "Krallice impressively continue to challenge what is expected of black metal."

== Track listing ==
Instead of traditional writing credits, songs are listed as being "initiated" by band members, indicating that the song was brought to completion by the band collectively. Unlike the others, track 4 was written and arranged by McMaster. Lyric credits are not included in the booklet, except to note that track 4 features text taken from a fragment by Michelangelo.

No.	Title	Lyrics	Music	Initiated By	Length
1.	"Dimensional Bleedthrough"	Barr		Barr	11:10
2.	"Autochthon"	Weinstein		Marston	9:30
3.	"Aridity"	Barr		Barr	14:51
4.	"The Mountain"	Michelangelo	McMaster		3:14
5.	"Intraum"	Barr		Barr	11:36
6.	"Untitled"			Marston	8:08
7.	"Monolith of Possession"	Barr		Marston	18:44

== Personnel ==
- Mick Barr - guitar, vocals
- Colin Marston - guitar, recording, mixing, mastering
- Nick McMaster - bass guitar, vocals, cover art
- Lev Weinstein - drums
