= Krallice =

American black metal band

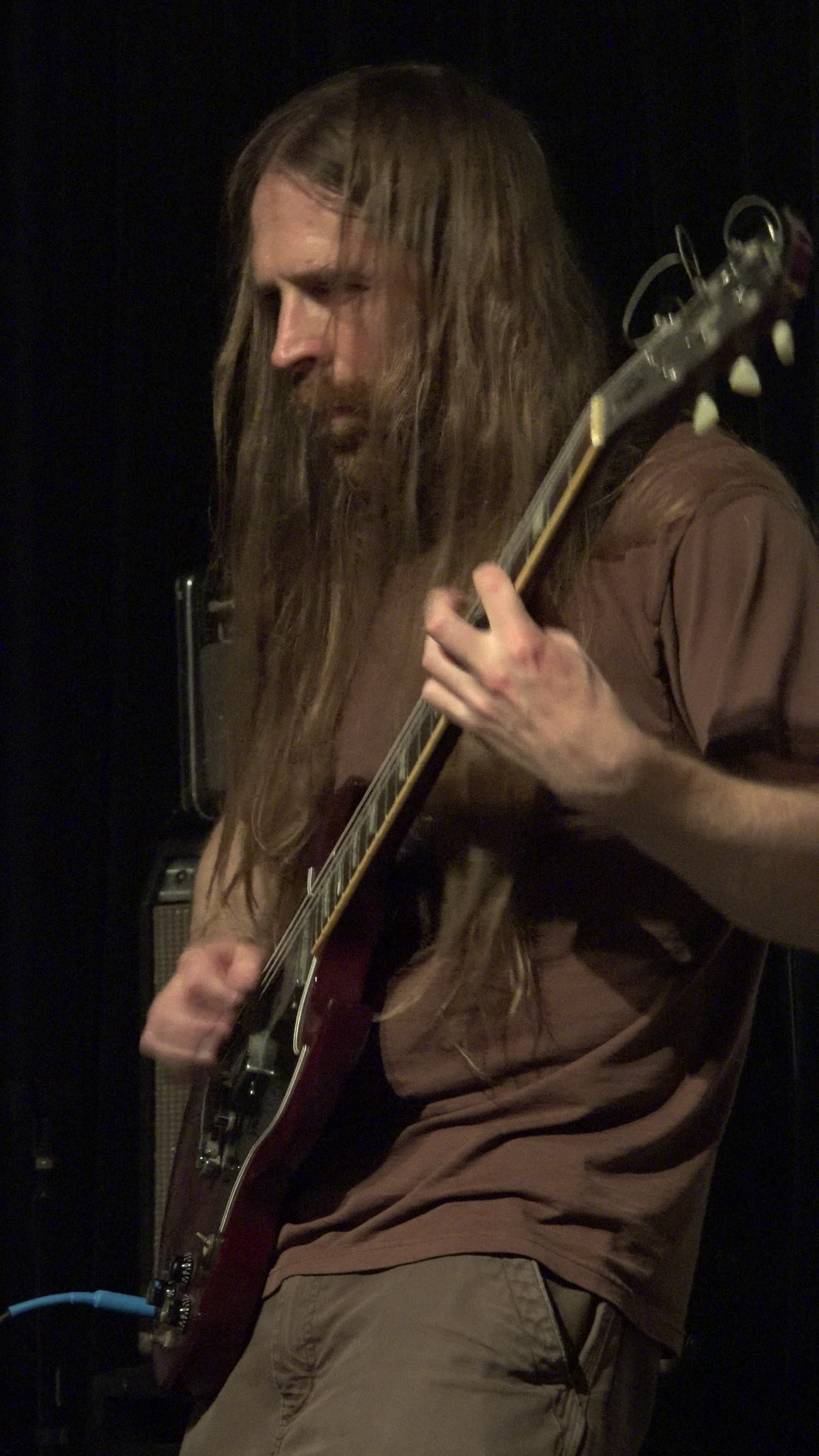
- Mick Barr at the Stone in 2015

Background information
- Origin: New York City, U.S.
- Genres: Black metal, experimental metal
- Years active: 2007–present
- Labels: Profound Lore Records, Gilead Media
- Members: Mick Barr; Colin Marston; Lev Weinstein; Nick McMaster
- Website: krallice.bandcamp.com

Krallice is an American black metal band from the Woodhaven, Queens neighborhood of New York City. Formed in 2007 by musicians Colin Marston and Mick Barr, they play experimental, technical black metal.

In 2008, the band added bassist Nick McMaster and drummer Lev Weinstein. The band has released fifteen studio albums and three EPs, most recently the LP Scour Order on September 18, 2026. They have been described as "one of the most interesting, engaging black metal bands to emerge in recent years" and "one of the most important bands in modern black metal".

== History ==
Colin Marston and Mick Barr formed Krallice in 2007, in Marston's recording studio in the Woodhaven, Queens neighborhood of New York City. Barr said in an interview that "Colin and I had talked about trying to do a black metal record together with no real plans of making it sound good or even releasing it, but as we were writing the music we kind of let it take its own shape. And we liked it more than we expected to." They recruited drummer Lev Weinstein and bassist/second vocalist Nicholas McMaster. They released their debut full-length album Krallice in 2008 through Profound Lore to critical acclaim. Barr and Marston played bass on this album while McMaster learned the bass parts and performed additional vocals.

They released their second full-length album, Dimensional Bleedthrough, in November 2009 through Profound Lore and Gilead Media. The album received critical praise and was featured on a number of end-of-year lists. Around this time, Marston joined Canadian death metal band Gorguts, Barr worked on music with Barr-Nevai, and Weinstein began working with Bloody Panda. They returned with Diotima in April 2011. AllMusic wrote, "At their best, they're an overwhelming sonic force, and Diotima is their best album to date." Later that year, they released the single "Traditional" and the cover EP Orphans of Sickness.

Krallice independently released their fourth full-length album Years Past Matter in August 2012. Pitchfork described it as the most "relentless" and "unforgiving" album to date, and "a daunting, rewarding hour that calls for complete immersion." Invisible Oranges wrote that the album "incorporates the playful and bleak elements from their previous two releases to showcase a newfound restraint that speaks to a group perfecting their craft. The complex melody lines still carry their signature density but are delivered with the discovered finesse of a seasoned and well-maintained machine. There's an obvious scaling back, most notably on the intro to “IIIIIIIIII”, but their unerring tug-of-war between obscure chaos and blissful resolution seems even more heightened than previous efforts."

Following a period of quiet as the band members pursued their other projects, the band released their fifth full-length album Ygg Huur on July 30, 2015. The album's release was not announced in advance, and was named after a three-piece suite by Italian composer Giacinto Scelsi. The album received extremely positive reviews from many music critics. SPIN gave the album 8/10, describing it as "the band's most outwardly tortured material since their 2008 debut, when their take on black metal structures was still relatively straightforward." The album's style has been compared to Gorguts, Deathspell Omega, and Altar of Plagues. They followed this with the EP Hyperion on January 1, 2016. The material for this EP was written in 2013 for a split release that never materialised, and has been noted to represent a stylistic middle-ground between Years Past Matter and Ygg Huur.

== Musical style ==
Krallice plays a form of progressive, highly technical black metal similar in style to that of Weakling and Wolves in the Throne Room. The band's music features dense multi-tracked guitars often performing fast, precise tremolo-picked guitar passages. The band make frequent use of long, complex song structures. The earlier material drew more heavily on early black metal bands such as Burzum, Gorgoroth, and Ulver, though over time the band have significantly expanded their sound beyond those early influences. While they originally opted for a lo-fi approach to production (as is traditional in black metal), Colin Marston said that "Our music was too dense to come across successfully with a low-fi approach. So instead, I decided to do a full-on 2" tape, everything multi-mic'ed, layered, and carefully mixed production."

== Members ==
- Mick Barr – vocals, guitar (2007–present), bass (2022–present)
- Colin Marston – guitar (2007–present), synthesizers, additional drums, vocals, bass (2020–present)
- Lev Weinstein – drums (2008–present)
- Nick McMaster – bass, vocals (2008–present), guitar (2022–present)

== Discography ==
Studio albums

- 2008: Krallice (Profound Lore, Gilead Media)
- 2009: Dimensional Bleedthrough (Profound Lore, Gilead Media)
- 2011: Diotima (Profound Lore, Gilead Media)
- 2012: Years Past Matter (self-released, Gilead Media)
- 2015: Ygg huur (self-released, Gilead Media)
- 2016: Prelapsarian (self-released, Gilead Media)
- 2017: Loüm (self-released, Gilead Media)
- 2017: Go Be Forgotten (self-released, Gilead Media)
- 2020: Mass Cathexis (self-released, Gilead Media)
- 2021: Demonic Wealth (self-released, P2, Gilead Media)
- 2022: Crystalline Exhaustion (self-released, P2, Gilead Media)
- 2022: Psychagogue (self-released, Gilead Media)
- 2023: Porous Resonance Abyss (self-released, P2)
- 2023: Mass Cathexis 2 - The Kinetic Infinite (self-released)
- 2024: Inorganic Rites (self-released)
- 2026: Scour Order (Profound Lore)

Live albums

- 2019: Rot and Waste Live (self-released)

EPs

- 2011: Orphan of Sickness (self-released)
- 2016: Hyperion (self-released, Gilead Media)
- 2019: Wolf (self-released, Gilead Media)
- 2025: No Hope (self-released)

Singles

- 2011: "Traditional" (self-released)
- 2016: "Hate Power" (Adult Swim)
- 2020: "The Wheel" (self-released)
