= Psychic Maps =

Studio album by Dysrhythmia
- Released: July 7, 2009
- Recorded: February 2009 at "Menegroth: The Thousand Caves" in Woodhaven, New York City
- Genre: Progressive metal
- Length: 36:04
- Label: Relapse
- Producer: Colin Marston

Dysrhythmia chronology
Barriers and Passages (2006)	Psychic Maps (2009)	Test of Submission (2012)

Professional ratings
Review scores
Source	Rating
Allmusic	3.5/5 stars
Kerrang!	(3/5)
Pitchfork Media	(7/10)
Rock Sound	(7/10)

Psychic Maps is the fifth studio album by American progressive metal band Dysrhythmia. The album was released through Relapse Records, on July 7, 2009.

== Critical reception ==
Kerrang! gave the album a generally positive review. "Throughout the six tracks, there's richness of sound that throws a nod in the direction of Don Caballero, but they are capable of utterly kicking you arse when they want to with rushes of percussive violence and frantically mangled guitar, occasionally delving into the kind of assonance that makes your teeth hurt," reviewer Dan Slessor writes, giving it three K's out of five.

== Track listing ==
No.	Title	Length
1.	"Festival of Popular Delusions"	4:22
2.	"Triangular Stare"	5:47
3.	"Reactionary"	5:05
4.	"Room of Vertigo"	6:49
5.	"Iron Cathedral"	4:24
6.	"Lifted by Skin"	10:50

== Personnel ==
- Kevin Hufnagel – guitar
- Colin Marston – bass
- Jeff Eber – drums
