= Test of Submission =

Studio album by Dysrhythmia
- Released: August 28th, 2012
- Genre: Progressive metal
- Length: 45:12
- Label: Profound Lore Records

Dysrhythmia chronology
Psychic Maps (2009)	Test of Submission (2012)

Test of Submission is an album by the band Dysrhythmia. It is their first album with Profound Lore Records.

== Track listing ==
1. "In Secrecy" - 5:11
2. "Test of Submission" - 4:54
3. "The Line Always Snaps" - 6:06
4. "Running Towards the End" - 5:41
5. "In the Spirit of Catastrophe" - 7:02
6. "The Madness of Three" - 4:34
7. "Like Chameleons" - 4:03
8. "In Consequence" - 7:45

== Personnel ==
- Kevin Hufnagel – guitar
- Colin Marston – bass
- Jeff Eber – drums
