= No Interference =

Studio album by Dysrhythmia
- Released: 2001
- Genre: Avant-garde metal
- Length: 56:27
- Label: self-released

Dysrhythmia chronology
No Interference (2001)	Pretest (2003)

No Interference is an album by Dysrhythmia. It was rereleased in 2005 on Translation Loss Records with live bonus tracks.

== Track listing ==
No.	Title	Length
1.	"Body Destroyed, Brain Intact"	3:01
2.	"Craving for Transformation"	4:15
3.	"No Interference"	7:20
4.	"Circulatory System Overhaul"	6:34
5.	"Let You Fall"	10:51
6.	"Orbiting"	6:59
7.	"Nutritional Facelift"	3:03
8.	"Slumlord"	3:59
9.	"We Lead the Way"	3:54
10.	"Psychic Desolation"	4:40
11.	"Four, Five, Six Minutes Late"	1:51
