= Pretest =

Studio album by Dysrhythmia
- Released: May 13, 2003
- Genre: Progressive rock
- Length: 52:22
- Label: Relapse Records

Dysrhythmia chronology
| No Interference (2001) | Pretest (2003) | Barriers and Passages (2006) |

Pretest is an album by progressive rock band Dysrhythmia. It is their third full-length overall and their first release on Relapse Records.

== Track listing ==
| No. | Title | Length |
|---|---|---|
| 1. | "Bastard" | 6:20 |
| 2. | "My Relationship" | 2:29 |
| 3. | "And Just Go" | 6:16 |
| 4. | "Heat Sink" | 4:21 |
| 5. | "Running Shoe Of Justice" | 5:45 |
| 6. | "Annihilation II" | 6:14 |
| 7. | "Annihilation I" | 4:40 |
| 8. | "Catalog Of Personal Faults" | 5:24 |
| 9. | "Touch Benediction" | 11:39 |
