= Imperial Triumphant =

American experimental metal band

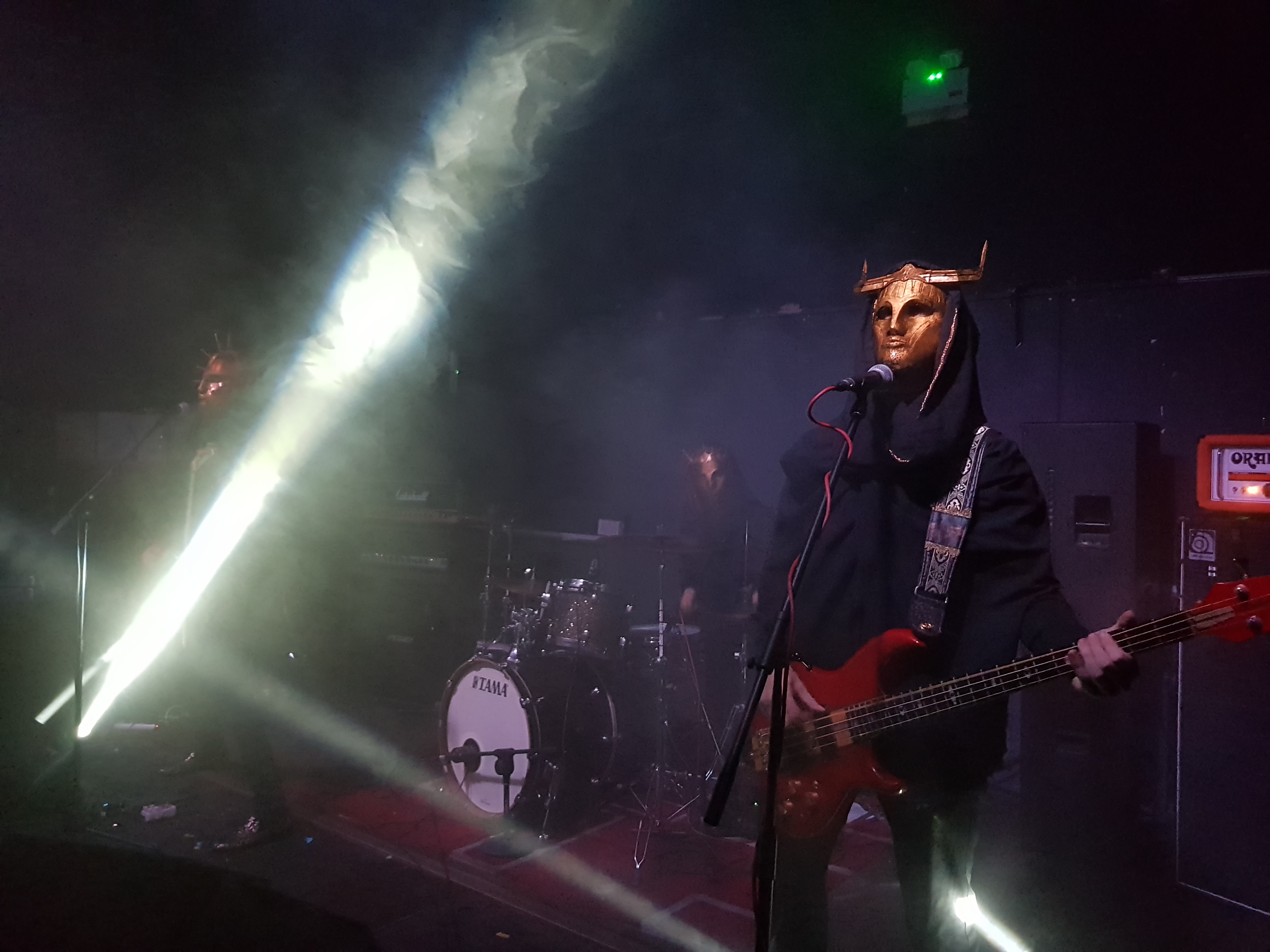
- Imperial Triumphant performing in 2019

Background information
- Origin: New York City, U.S.
- Genres: Avant-garde metal; blackened death metal; jazz fusion
- Years active: 2005–present
- Labels: Metal Blade Records; Century Media; Gilead Media; Throatruiner Records
- Members: Zachary Ezrin; Kenny Grohowski; Steve Blanco
- Website: imperial-triumphant.com

Imperial Triumphant is an American avant-garde metal band formed in 2005 in New York City.

== History ==
Imperial Triumphant was formed in 2005 by Zachary Ezrin in New York City. Their first album, Abominamentvm, was released in 2012. Imperial Triumphant's second album, Abyssal Gods, was released in 2015. Described by No Clean Singing's Austin Weber, "Abyssal Gods is overall a thoroughly vicious act of blasphemy packed with more memorable moments than many bands accumulate in a lifetime of albums". Commenting on the band's effort to date as a whole, Weber stated "Imperial Triumphant are not only one of the most important U.S. black metal acts currently active, truly carving their own stylistic path, but they are also important to the future of black metal."

Following the second album, in March 2016, Imperial Triumphant released Inceste. A review in Decibel magazine commented that "Imperial Triumphant obviously have no use for the genre game... Inceste continues to warp expectations".

Following the release of the studio album Vile Luxury, Imperial Triumphant embarked on their first European tour in April 2019, including a show at Roadburn Festival. This was followed by further European dates in November 2019, including headlining the 'Cult Never Dies Stage' at Damnation Festival in Leeds, UK.

In October 2019, it was announced that Imperial Triumphant had signed to Century Media Records and plan to release new material in 2020. Subsequent Instagram posts from the band confirmed they had begun tracking at Colin Marston's Menegroth Studios in New York on December 10, 2019.

Imperial Triumphant were one of the many bands whose touring plans were affected by the COVID-19 pandemic, postponing the 'Devastation on the Nation' tour until 2021.

In April 2020, Imperial Triumphant announced via Instagram that the new album would be entitled Alphaville and would be released July 21, 2020. Alongside this announcement a documentary video was released via Metal Injection detailing behind-the-scenes work on Alphaville and guest musicians who had collaborated, amongst them Tomas Haake of Meshuggah, longtime collaborator Colin Marston, and Trey Spruance of Mr. Bungle. Metal Hammer named Alphaville as the 10th best metal album of 2020.

In May 2022, Imperial Triumphant announced their album 'Spirit of Ecstasy' with the release of the music video for the track 'Maximalist Scream'. This was followed up with a release of the song 'Merkurius Gilded' with accompanying music video in June, featuring guest guitars from former bandmate Max Gorelick, and Kenny G on soprano saxophone. 'Spirit of Ecstasy' was released on 22 July 2022.

Throughout 2023, Imperial Triumphant released a number of cover versions of songs as singles, spanning a wide range of genres. The series began with a cover of Radiohead's "Paranoid Android" in June, followed a month later by their version of Dizzy Gillespie's jazz standard "A Night In Tunisia". In September, they released their cover of Rush's "Jacob's Ladder", followed in October by a cover of Metallica's "Motorbreath". The final single release of 2023 was a cover of Wayne Shorter's "Nefertiti".

In May 2024, Imperial Triumphant released Vile Luxury (Redux 1924), a remastered version of the 2018 album.

Later in 2024, Imperial Triumphant released two singles, "Eye of Mars" on September 19 and "Hotel Sphinx" on November 13. The release of "Hotel Sphinx" coincided with the announcement of their sixth album, Goldstar, set to be released in March 2025. On January 16th, 2025, the band released the single "Lexington Delirium", featuring Tomas Haake of Meshuggah, along with revealing more details about Goldstar. “Pleasuredome” featuring Dave Lombardo and Meshuggah's Tomas Haake was released on February 12, 2025. On March 21, 2025, Goldstar was released to positive critical reviews.

== Musical style ==
Imperial Triumphant's musical style has changed since formation in 2005 to encompass musical and lyrical influence from their home city of New York. Commenting on the release of Vile Luxury in 2018, Ezrin described the record as "our most refined and metropolitan release to date", commenting further that the band had taken "the New York City influence that shaped the world, embraced the aspect of our sonic pyramid that at its core comes from jazz, and applied it to black metal".

== Visual style ==
The band members wear costumes and employ a retro-futuristic stage presence, especially referencing smoking advertisements from the first half of the 20th century. Gold and black are their primary colors for costumes and stage decor. Aesthetically, they utilize New York City's Art Deco architecture with jazz flair as an inspiration.

Their logo has notably changed at least five times, the self titled demo had a drawn logo that also appeared on their first studio album Obeisance, the second demo Immortal Iron Glory featured the band's name in old English font, the logo then had a redesign featured inverted crosses and was black and white, the current logo is much more in line with their art deco aesthetic using gold and black which designed and updated with more sharp edges for the release of their album Gold Star in 2025 by Andrew Tremblay.

They wear golden masks designed by Shoegazerx. and black robes while performing.

Apollo (a golden halo with rays beaming outward, five long ones holding the halo, and in between each there are three smaller rays from a central point, and gold chains across it and worn around the neck). This is the 2nd iteration of the mask (the previous version did not have the halo). This is worn by Zachary Ezrin. Apollo was the Greek god of music, prophecy and healing.

Hecate (seven rays upward, with a crest below them of the triple moon pagan symbol). This is worn by Kenny Grohowski. This mask is similar to New York City's Statue of Liberty in its number of rays, though they are more tightly grouped here. Hecate was the Greek goddess of magic and crossroads.

Baal (a bull-like mask with two small horns in its upper corners and a coffin-like crest between them, followed by vertical pleats underneath). This is worn by Steve Blanco. Baal may reference Baal Hammon, chief god in ancient Carthage.

== Band members ==
Current members

- Zachary Ezrin – vocals, guitars (2005–present) [Apollo Mask]
- Kenny Grohowski – drums (2012–present) [Hecate Mask]
- Steve Blanco – bass, vocals, keyboards (2014–present) [Baal Mask]

Previous members

- Naargryl Fjellkrieger – bass, backing vocals (2005–2012)
- Amarok Myrvandr – cello, guitars, violin (2005–2012)
- Maelström – drums (2005–2008)
- Alex Cohen – drums (2008)
- Erik Malave – bass (2012–2015)
- Max Gorelick – guitars (2016)

== Discography ==
Studio albums

- Abominamentvm (2012)
- Abyssal Gods (2015)
- Vile Luxury (2018)
- Alphaville (2020)
- Spirit of Ecstasy (2022)
- Vile Luxury (Redux 1924) [Remaster & Remix] (2024)
- Goldstar (2025)
- Imprints of Man (2025)

EPs

- Obeisance (2010)
- Goliath (2013)
- Inceste (2016)
- Covers Collection (2023)

Singles

- "Manifesto" (2012)
- "Rotted Futures" (2020)
- "City Swine" (2020)
- "Atomic Age" (2020)
- "Maximalist Scream" (2022)
- "Merkurius Gilded" (2022)
- "Tower of Glory, City of Shame" (2022)
- "Paranoid Android" (2023)
- "A Night In Tunisia" (2023)
- "Jacob's Ladder" (2023)
- "Motorbreath" (2023)
- "Nefertiti" (2023)
- "Eye of Mars" (2024)
- "Hotel Sphinx" (2024)
- "Lexington Delirium" (2025)
- "Pleasuredome" (2025)

Live Albums

- An Evening With Imperial Triumphant (Live At Slipper Room) (2021)
- Live at Olympia (2026)

Compilations

- Shrine to the Trident Throne (2014)

Demos

- Imperial Triumphant (2008)
- Immortal Iron Glory (2008)
