= Diotima (album) =

Studio album by Krallice
- Released: April 26, 2011
- Recorded: January–September 2010
- Genre: Black metal, experimental metal
- Length: 68:58
- Label: Profound Lore

Krallice chronology
Dimensional Bleedthrough (2009)	Diotima (2011)	Years Past Matter (2012)

Diotima is the third album by the American experimental black metal band Krallice. It was released in 2011 by Profound Lore Records.

== Critical reception ==
Professional ratings
Review scores
Source	Rating
AllMusic	5/5 stars
Chronicles of Chaos	6/10
Pitchfork	7.6/10
PopMatters	8/10

PopMatters called the album "yet another extraordinary piece of work that raises the proverbial bar once again ... this isn't just experimental; it's genuinely catchy."

The Village Voice wrote: "Diotima is the kind of album that requires multiple listens, possibly alternating between headphones and speakers, to absorb. Assaultive at first, it gradually blooms: The guitar lines separate, and the intricate ebb and flow of the rhythm section... becomes more and more clear."

The editors of AllMusic awarded the album a full 5 stars, and Phil Freeman called it "the group's best work to date." He wrote: "Krallice... aren't all that interested in preserving black metal in the amber of tradition. They're taking what they like from the genre and amplifying its power by adding elements from prog rock and minimalism, then stretching the songs to extraordinary length... in order to push the listener toward cathartic transcendence. At their best, they're an overwhelming sonic force."

Pitchfork's Grayson Haver Currin commented: "Unapologetically extreme and intense, it's the most relentless album from a hyper-dexterous band that's never been one to take it easy... Diotima forgoes the long-short-long tack of previous Krallice efforts, creating marathons out of marathons that demand complete attention and destroy attention spans."

== Track listing ==
CD and digital edition

No.	Title	Length
1.	"–"	2:07
2.	"Inhume"	6:51
3.	"The Clearing"	12:11
4.	"Diotima"	12:27
5.	"Litany of Regrets"	13:40
6.	"Telluric Rings"	12:09
7.	"Dust and Light"	9:33

Vinyl edition

No.	Title	Length
1.	"–"	2:07
2.	"The Clearing"	12:11
3.	"Inhume"	6:51
4.	"Diotima"	12:27
5.	"Litany of Regrets"	13:40
6.	"Telluric Rings"	12:09
7.	"Dust and Light"	9:33

== Personnel ==
Krallice

- Mick Barr – guitar, vocals
- Colin Marston – guitar
- Nick McMaster – bass guitar, vocals
- Lev Weinstein – drums

Others

- Max Hooper – artwork
- Nick McMaster – artwork
- Karlynn Holland – logo
- Colin Marston – recording, mixing, mastering
