= Obscura (album) =

Studio album by Gorguts
- Released: June 23, 1998
- Recorded: Studio Victor (Montreal)
- Genres: Technical death metal; progressive metal; avant-garde metal
- Length: 60:25
- Labels: Olympic; Slipdisc; Mercury
- Producers: Gorguts; Pierre Rémillard

Gorguts chronology
The Erosion of Sanity (1993)	Obscura (1998)	From Wisdom to Hate (2001)

Obscura is the third studio album by Canadian death metal band Gorguts, released on June 23, 1998 through Olympic Recordings. Since its release, Obscura has come to be regarded as one of the most important albums in the technical death metal genre, and as "one of the most complex and technical records in the genre, due to its unprecedented dissonance and experimentation brought by the band's late guitarist Steeve Hurdle." Lyrically, the album touches on spiritual and existential themes, representing a further departure from the band's previously established approach. Luc Lemay has described the album as "the record that defined our sound." The album was reissued through Century Media Records in 2015.

== History ==
Following the release in 1993 of their second full-length The Erosion of Sanity, the band took part in a European tour with Blasphemy. The band's return coincided with the decline of death metal's popularity, and they were subsequently dropped from the Roadrunner roster. Following their departure from the label, they "started writing material for Obscura". Gorguts suffered further due to the departure of its drummer and guitarist, who were later replaced by 'Purulence' guitarist Steeve Hurdle and 'Psychic Throb' bassist Steve Cloutier respectively.

The album was actually almost entirely written by the end of 1993, however it was delayed by a lack of label interest, and wasn't released until 1998. Writing began in April 1993 and was almost complete by late December of the same year. "We jammed these songs for four years without writing anything else in hopes that someone would call us or something. I remember I sent some tapes to record labels and they didn't even write back. They were not even interested. We didn't know it was ever going to come out."

== Musical style ==
[Obscura] was well received, but it was a very small audience. It took a while, and people were like, “What the fuck is this?” Now, when I say ‘Obscura’, everybody has their fist in the air, it’s like, “Yeah, bring it on!” (laughs). It’s time, you know? It just happens with time. The sound was able to find its place.

— Guitarist and songwriter, Luc Lemay,

Obscura represented a significant change in sound for the band, and has been described as moving towards "more complex and groundbreaking musical ideas." The album "is considered to be one of the most complex and technical records in the genre, due to its unprecedented dissonance and experimentation brought by the band's late guitarist Steeve Hurdle." The album makes use of complex song structures, unorthodox sounds, dissonant guitarwork, unconventional time signatures, and esoteric lyrical themes.

AllMusic's William York wrote that "The guitar/bass harmonies are extremely discordant, the guitar leads are full of alien harmonic squeals and other foreign noises (the title track, for example, features a recurring, legitimately atonal melody played via fingertapping), and the drums change tempos and time signatures in spastic, whiplash-inducing fashion." York also notes that despite the apparent chaos of the album's sound, "it possesses an underlying sense of logic and structure that does reveal itself upon repeat listens. A number of memorable, if strange, guitar melodies emerge throughout the album and help provide a sense of order and thematic unity amidst the apparent chaos; "Earthly Love" and "Nostalgia" are especially strong examples of this." Pitchfork's Hank Shteamer has described Obscura as "one of the most pungently progressive albums ever made, in or out of metal. Obscura didn't just register as technical; it sounded downright excruciating, as if its shuddering blastbeats, doleful bellows, and deliriously inventive guitarwork were being torn straight from the chests of its makers."

== Reception and legacy ==
Professional ratings
Review scores
Source	Rating
AllMusic	4/5 stars
Brave Words & Bloody Knuckles	9.5/10
Chronicles of Chaos	9.5/10
Collector's Guide to Heavy Metal	7/10
The Encyclopedia of Popular Music	3/5 stars
Metal.de	10/10
Metal Forces	9.5/10
Metal Rules	5/5
Rock Hard	7.5/10
Sputnikmusic	5/5

Obscura has come to be regarded as a pioneering album often described as being well ahead of its time, "one of the greatest albums ever made", and "a classic". It has also been noted as a significant influence on a range of other metal bands, including Ulcerate, Spawn of Possession, Brain Drill, and Obscura, who named their band after the album. William York of AllMusic categorized Obscura as "one of the most challenging, difficult albums ever released within the metal genre" and "a work of great depth and vision". Dean Brown of PopMatters stated that "because of its influence, Obscura will always be a benchmark to which dissonant, technical death metal will be measured; and it's a release that time and circumstance has turned into an unbreakable marble altar."

In 2011, Brave Words & Bloody Knuckles ranked Obscura at number 27 on its list of the "Top 30 Canadian Hard Rock/Heavy Metal Albums Of All-Time". In 2025, Joe DiVita of Loudwire listed the album as the best death metal album of 1998, writing: "In 1998, many failed to wrap their heads around the atonal warped chaos of Gorguts’ third album, Obscura. Luc Lemay found notes completely off the fretboard, exploring vastly uncharted territory in extreme metal. Dizzying time signatures are unforgiving and the structures come across as entirely randomized, but the fact that this was all calculated is a testament to the genius at work here."

== Track listing ==
All lyrics are written by Luc Lemay and Steeve Hurdle.

No.	Title	Music	Length
1.	"Obscura"	Hurdle, Lemay	4:04
2.	"Earthly Love"	Hurdle, Lemay, Cloutier	4:04
3.	"The Carnal State"	Cloutier, Hurdle	3:08
4.	"Nostalgia"	Cloutier, Hurdle	6:10
5.	"The Art of Sombre Ecstasy"	Cloutier, Lemay	4:20
6.	"Clouded"	Hurdle	9:32
7.	"Subtle Body"	Cloutier, Hurdle, Lemay	3:23
8.	"Rapturous Grief"	Cloutier, Hurdle, Lemay	5:27
9.	"La vie est prélude... (La Mort Orgasme)"	Cloutier, Hurdle, Lemay	3:28
10.	"Illuminatus"	Cloutier, Hurdle, Lemay	6:15
11.	"Faceless Ones"	Cloutier, Hurdle	3:50
12.	"Sweet Silence" (instrumental)	Cloutier, Hurdle, Lemay	6:45
Total length:			60:25

== Personnel ==
- Gorguts – producer
  - Luc Lemay – guitar, artistic direction, vocals, viola, artwork
  - Steeve Hurdle – guitar, vocals, concept idealisation, artistic direction, songs and album title
  - Steve Cloutier – bass guitar
  - Patrick Robert – drums
- Pierre Rémillard – producer, engineer
- Sylvain Brisebois – master
- Joel Beaupré – photography
- Alain Cloutier – artwork
