= Considered Dead =

Studio album by Gorguts
- Released: October 8, 1991
- Studio: Morrisound Recording, Tampa, Florida
- Genre: Death metal
- Length: 37:54
- Label: Roadrunner Records
- Producer: Scott Burns, Gorguts

Gorguts chronology
...And Then Comes Lividity (1990)	Considered Dead (1991)	The Erosion of Sanity (1993)

Professional ratings
Review scores
Source	Rating
Activate	5/5 stars
AllMusic	3.5/5 stars
Disposable Underground	Favorable
High Speed Death	Favorable
Sloth	3/5 stars
Souled	55/100

Considered Dead is the debut studio album by Canadian death metal band Gorguts. It was released on October 8, 1991, by Roadrunner.

The album is considered to represent an "old-school death metal" sound. Although the music is extremely fast and technical, the album also contains slower doom-influenced sections, as well as sections that incorporate melody.

Metal Hammer stated the opinion that the album was underrated. The album has gained a cult following since its release.

== Music ==
AllMusic stated that the album represents "the purest form of old-school death metal." Metal Hammer described the album's style as "flat-out death metal". The album's sound has been compared to Sepultura and Death. The instrumentation is extremely complex and contains melodic sections with guitar harmonies, as well as slower, doom-influenced riffs.

== Background and release history ==
Gorguts had signed with Roadrunner after the release of their 1990 demo ...And Then Comes Lividity. The track "Hematological Allergy" was the only song from the demo that made it onto the album because the band wasn't pleased with the other songs. After being signed to Roadrunner, the band replaced Gary Chouinard with Sylvain Marcoux on guitar and started writing new songs. The band changed their logo for the album because they considered it easier to read. Roadrunner choose Scott Burns as producer.

The album features backing vocals by Chris Barnes of Cannibal Corpse on the tracks "Bodily Corrupted", "Rottenatomy", and "Hematological Allergy", as well as a guitar solo on "Inoculated Life" by James Murphy. Singer and guitarist Luc Lemay had organised their participation before the album was recorded.

In 1992, the band embarked on the "Blood, Guts and Gore" US tour together with Cannibal Corpse and Atheist in support of the album, which was well received.

Considered Dead saw a number of reissues. It was remastered, reissued and paired with its successor, The Erosion of Sanity, as part of Roadrunner's Two from the Vault series, in 2004. Polish label Metal Mind reissued the remastered album in 2006 with two demo tracks. British independent record label Cherry Red reissued the band's first two albums as double CD in 2025. The release contains the demo tracks and a booklet with a recent interview with band founder and only remaining original member Luc Lemay.

== Track listing ==
All lyrics are written by Luc Lemay; all music is composed by Gorguts, except where noted.

No.	Title	Length
1.	"...And Then Comes Lividity" (Music composed by Lemay)	0:43
2.	"Stiff and Cold"	4:27
3.	"Disincarnated"	4:27
4.	"Considered Dead"	3:31
5.	"Rottenatomy"	4:45
6.	"Bodily Corrupted"	3:41
7.	"Waste of Mortality"	4:37
8.	"Drifting Remains"	3:42
9.	"Hematological Allergy"	4:09
10.	"Inoculated Life"	3:52

2006 reissue bonus tracks
No.	Title	Length
11.	"Considered Dead" (Demo)	3:36
12.	"Rottenatomy" (Demo)	4:47
Total length:		46:17

== Personnel ==
=== Gorguts ===
- Luc Lemay – rhythm, lead and acoustic guitars, vocals
- Sylvain Marcoux – guitar
- Eric Giguere – bass
- Stephane Provencher – drums

=== Additional personnel ===
- James Murphy – guitar solo (on "Inoculated Life")
- Chris Barnes – vocals (on tracks 5, 6, 9)

=== Technical personnel ===
- Produced by Scott Burns and Gorguts
- Recorded and mixed by Scott Burns
- Mastered by Michael Sarsfield
- Dan Seagrave – cover illustration
- Logo and cover concept by Luc Lemay
- Ivan-Pierre Dubois – photo
- Patricia Mooney – art direction
- Matt Vickerstaff – 2016 reissue layout
