= Pyrrhon (band) =

American technical death metal band

- Origin: Brooklyn, New York, United States
- Genres: Technical death metal, mathcore
- Years active: 2008–present
- Labels: Relapse
- Members: Dylan DiLella; Erik Malave; Doug Moore; Steve Schwegler
- Past members: Alex Cohen; Mike Sheen

Pyrrhon is a technical death metal quartet based in Brooklyn, New York. Formed in 2008, the group comprises vocalist Doug Moore, guitarist Dylan DiLella, bassist Erik Malave, and drummer Steve Schwegler. Doug Moore says the group's main objective is to expand the definition of heavy metal while retaining the same passion of the genre.

== History ==
Guitarist Dylan DiLella and bassist Mike Sheen met on a subway platform. The two decided on forming a band and invited drummer Alex Cohen, a classmate of Sheen's, and vocalist Doug Moore, whom DiLella had known since high school, to join the band. After some dispute the group settled on recording and performing under the name Pyrrhon, inspired by the Greek philosopher, Pyrrho. The band was officially formed in November 2008.

In 2009, Sheen departed from the group to study abroad and was replaced by Erik Malave. The band's first official release was an EP titled Fever Kingdoms, issued on Path Less Traveled in 2010. Pyrrhon's full-length debut, An Excellent Servant But a Terrible Master, was released in 2011 and was met with some acclaim in underground circles. The success of the album caught the attention of major label Relapse Records, who signed the band in 2013. The Mother of Virtues was released in 2014. Composed over a two-year period, the album featured a tighter sound and greater instrumental virtuosity.

The band released the EP Growth Without End was released on June 2, 2015. In August, founding member Alex Cohen decided to depart from the band and performed his last show with Pyrrhon on September 29. Steve Schwegler joined the band in October to replace Cohen. Running Out of Skin was released in 2016 and comprised three studio improvisations and a Death cover.

On August 11, 2017 the band released their third full-length studio album What Passes for Survival.

== Band members ==
Current lineup

- Doug Moore – vocals (2008–present)
- Dylan DiLella – guitar (2008–present)
- Erik Malave – bass (2010–present)
- Steve Schwegler – drums (2015–present)

Former members

- Mike Sheen – bass (2008–2009)
- Alex Cohen – drums (2008–2015)

Timeline

== Discography ==
Studio albums

- An Excellent Servant But a Terrible Master (Selfmadegod, 2011)
- The Mother of Virtues (Relapse, 2014)
- What Passes for Survival (Willowtip, 2017)
- Abscess Time (Willowtip, 2020)
- Exhaust (Willowtip, 2024)

Extended plays

- Fever Kingdoms (Path Less Traveled, 2010)
- Growth Without End (Handshake, 2015)
- Running Out of Skin (2016)
