= Krallice (album) =

Studio album by Krallice
- Released: July 11, 2008
- Genre: Black metal
- Length: 61:47
- Labels: Profound Lore; Gilead Media
- Producer: Colin Marston

Krallice chronology
Krallice (2008)	Dimensional Bleedthrough (2009)

Vinyl cover

Krallice is the first album by the New York–based black metal band Krallice. It was released on compact disc on July 11, 2008 by the Canada-based Profound Lore Records, and on vinyl in March 2009 by the American-based Gilead Media.

The album was recorded before Nick McMaster had joined the band so he only appears as an additional vocalist on the recording and the bass guitar was played by both Marston and Barr.

== Recording ==
Colin Marston recorded, mixed and mastered the album in his studio Menegroth, the Thousand Caves in Woodhaven, Queens. Though the band initially intended to use a lo-fi approach, the music was too dense to come out successfully. The album was recorded on 2" tape with multiple microphones and guitar layers. Marston describes it as "pure and ambient" as a contrast to the buzzy trebley guitar and fake reverb found on some older black metal. The guitars were doubled with different tones and recorded in the same room as the amps so that feedback proliferates the recording. The bass guitar was run through two amplifiers, one slightly dirtier than the other. The drums were tuned as low as possible and recorded from a distance to give a loud sound with no reverb or triggers.

== Reception ==
Professional ratings
Review scores
Source	Rating
AllMusic	(4/5)
Pitchfork	(7.8/10)
Dead Rhetoric	(8/10)

In a review for AllMusic, Phil Freeman called Krallice "an album full of high-speed shifts and sudden left turns, as guitar solos erupt out of the riff-storm like a demonic dolphin leaping from a lake of lava, or the band suddenly halts what had seemed like frantic, headlong momentum to begin playing an entirely different riff."

A reviewer for Pitchfork stated: "The results are hard to grasp, but strangely addictive. Krallice would have made a marvelous soundtrack to Pi."

Dead Rhetoric's David E. Gehlke commented: "a six-song stormer that is as frenetic and memorable as anything to pop out of the underground the last 12 months... Highly recommend, essential, etc. and so forth –Krallice is the USBM album of the year."

A writer for the Metal Detektor described the album as "a superb black metal record," and wrote: "With this debut, Krallice have risen to and arguably surpassed Wolves in the Throne Room like levels of elite American black metal brilliance, and once again shows that Profound Lore... is a truly elite label."

A reviewer for Burning Ambulance portrayed the album as "a six-song explosion of hoarse screams, avalanche-like blast beats and stunningly intertwined guitar riffs," and remarked: "Each track erupted in virtuosity—solos rocket out of nowhere, riffs took sudden sharp turns. It was breathtaking, but impossible to absorb or decipher without multiple focused listens."

In 2013, Decibel ranked Krallice at number 47 on its list of the Top 100 Black Metal Albums of All Time.

== Track listing ==
No music or lyrics credits are given.

No.	Title	Length
1.	"Wretched Wisdom"	10:15
2.	"Cnestorial"	10:43
3.	"Molec Codices"	9:35
4.	"Timehusk"	6:06
5.	"Energy Chasms"	9:46
6.	"Forgiveness in Rot"	15:22

== Credits ==
Krallice

- Mick Barr - vocals, guitar, bass guitar
- Colin Marston - guitar, bass guitar
- Lev Weinstein - drums

Additional musicians

- Nick McMaster - additional vocals

Other

- Colin Marston - recording, mixing, mastering
- Scott Lenhardt - cover artwork
- Karlynn Holland - band logo
