= Years Past Matter =

Studio album by Krallice
- Released: August 25, 2012
- Genre: Black metal, progressive metal
- Length: 60:37
- Label: Self-released

Krallice chronology
Diotima (2011)	Years Past Matter (2012)	Ygg huur (2015)

Years Past Matter is the fourth studio album by the American black metal band Krallice. It was self-released by the band as a limited edition CD on August 25, 2012. A vinyl version of the album was subsequently released by Gilead Media on March 19, 2013.

== Musical style ==
Years Past Matter adopts the "progressive black metal" style of their previous albums. The vocalists, Mick Barr and Nicolas McMaster, "approach their screams with equal gusto but very different tones." The basslines of McMaster were also described as "essential to the overall effect as the guitars."

According to Pitchfork's writer Grayson Currin, the album's second track, "IIIIIIII", has "a rhythmic momentum written into the guitar lines when the fuselage of drums pauses for about 15 seconds." The closing track, "IIIIIIIIIIII" is largely instrumental and is built on a short, flicking riff that "Colin Marston and Barr stretch".

== Critical reception ==
Professional ratings
Review scores
Source	Rating
Pitchfork	(8.2/10)
Metal Injection	(9.4/10)

Grayson Currin of Pitchfork Media gave the album a positive review, writing, "They've [Krallice] never sounded as comprehensive and confident as they do on Years Past Matter." He also described the album as "the band's most relentless and unforgiving, comprising six tracks of impossibly choreographed and dense four-part motion".

A reviewer for Metal Injection stated: "Years Past Matter feels effortless, as if the band have submitted to their own manic energy. That delirious acquiescence has yielded extraordinary results... Years Past Matter just might be Krallice's finest moment."

Aaron Maltz of Invisible Oranges commented: "Years Past Matter incorporates the playful and bleak elements from their previous two releases to showcase a newfound restraint that speaks to a group perfecting their craft. The complex melody lines still carry their signature density but are delivered with the discovered finesse of a seasoned and well-maintained machine."

Writing for Treble, Jeff Terich remarked: "Krallice takes patience, but there's never been a test of endurance they haven't yet rewarded with a stunningly immersive experience... Only when one gives his attention fully to Years Past Matter does its glory present itself in full."

== Track listing ==
All songs written and performed by Krallice.

No.	Title	Length
1.	"IIIIIII"	8:19
2.	"IIIIIIII"	11:12
3.	"IIIIIIIII"	12:13
4.	"IIIIIIIIII"	10:26
5.	"IIIIIIIIIII"	1:46
6.	"IIIIIIIIIIII"	16:41
Total length:		60:37

== Personnel ==
- Mick Barr - guitar, vocals
- Colin Marston - guitar
- Lev Weinstein - drums
- Nicholas McMaster - bass guitar
