= Pleiades' Dust =

EP by Gorguts
- Released: May 13, 2016
- Recorded: October–December 2015
- Studio: Menegroth, The Thousand Caves Studio in New York City
- Genre: Technical death metal, avant-garde metal
- Length: 33:00
- Label: Season of Mist
- Producer: Colin Marston

Gorguts chronology
Colored Sands (2013)	Pleiades' Dust (2016)

Pleiades' Dust is the first EP by the Canadian technical death metal band Gorguts, released on May 13, 2016, through Season of Mist. It consists of a single track which runs for thirty-three minutes and is roughly divided into seven movements. It is also the band's only recording with drummer Patrice Hamelin, who has been performing with the band live since 2011 but only became an official member in 2014 after the departure of John Longstreth (whose schedule with Origin was incompatible with Gorguts).

== Writing and musical style ==
Pleiades' Dust presents a historical narrative on the House of Wisdom, an ancient library that stood in Baghdad from the 9th-13th century. The library contained and protected much of the world's knowledge until it was destroyed by the Mongols in 1258CE. According to lyricist and lead songwriter Luc Lemay, "the lyrics of the song start with the fall of Rome around 500 A.D., then go to Baghdad in 762 when they founded the city, then the Mongol invasion in the 1200s, when the library was destroyed." In a separate interview referencing the Islamic Golden Age, Lemay further explained that "I talk about knowledge as if it was like a wandering person. So for some reason the knowledge reappeared in the Middle East, and there was a very strong movement of intellect there." "It’s kind of refreshing to remind ourselves where those beautiful things come from. The numbers we use, that’s where it’s from. Algebra, that’s where it’s from. Of course, we are not waking up in the morning and getting a fix of algebra. That’s not what I’m saying. But we take those things for granted. I think it’s very interesting and beautiful to discover and understand where those things are from."

Though Lemay wrote the majority of the first 20 minutes of the song, every band member contributed their own ideas and details to the songwriting. "This is a new thing for me, and I like this better though. It’s way better than having to stand there in the rehearsing room one-on-one and trying to explain with bad air drumming. Instead I’m at my studio, really focused, taking my time and saying “ok, here I hear a fill” and write it down. I'm not a drummer, but that's a more precise way for me to explain my ideas. Then when I give it to everybody, they have a pretty good idea of what I hear in my head, but that doesn't mean it's set in stone. Not at all! The point to do that is to say “ok guys, drum-wise this is what I’m picturing and this is the best idea up to now.” But they can feel free to change it if they hear something different."

Lemay has cited a number of influences on the writing of Pleiades' Dust. The French avant-garde black metal band Deathspell Omega's EP 'Chaining the Katechon', Meshuggah 'I', and particularly Porcupine Tree's album 'The Incident' all influenced his decision to write such a long song. In an interview with Noisey, Lemay said that "the challenge was totally in the song structure, and that’s where I wanted to put myself into an uncomfortable place. It was the first time I wrote a piece this long, and the number one rule was that I didn’t want it to sound like three or four songs put together. And I think we did it. You can feel movements happening, but you don’t feel like each movement is a song by itself. That was important."

== Critical reception ==
Professional ratings
Aggregate scores
Source	Rating
Metacritic	80/100
Review scores
Source	Rating
Exclaim!	9/10
Metal Hammer	4/5 stars
Metal Injection	10/10
MetalSucks	5/5 stars
Revolver	3.5/5
Spin	7/10
Sputnikmusic	4.4/5
Ultimate Guitar	9/10

Pleiades' Dust was met with very positive reviews from music critics. At Metacritic (a review aggregator site which assigns a normalized rating out of 100 from music critics), based on 5 critics, the album has received a score of 80/100, which indicates "universal acclaim".

Metalsucks declared the release a "total fucking masterpiece" and "an actually enjoyable, challenging piece of art", and rated the album with a perfect score of 5 out of 5. Exclaim! gave the EP a 9 out of 10 rating, calling it "a stunning release, a cohesive, exceptionally crafted piece that captures the heavy aggression and incredible musicianship of Gorguts while incorporating more avant-garde elements and a fascinating storyline to boot". Revolver rated the album 3.5 out of 5, noting that Gorguts "still manage to break barriers", their "musicianship... is top notch", and "this EP is by no means a casual listen".

== Track listing ==
All tracks are written by Luc Lemay.

No.	Title	Length
1.	"Pleiades' Dust"; I. "Thinker's Slumber"; II. "Wandering Times"; III. "Within the Rounded Walls"; IV. "Pearls of Translation"; V. "Compendiums"; VI. "Stranded Minds on the Shores of Doubt"; VII. "Besieged"	32:57; 4:05; 3:11; 2:13; 3:15; 5:20; 3:10; 11:43

== Personnel ==
Personnel adapted from liner notes.

- Luc Lemay - rhythm guitar, vocals
- Kevin Hufnagel - rhythm guitar, lead guitar
- Colin Marston - bass, mixing, mastering, production
- Patrice Hamelin - drums
- Zbigniew M. Bielak - cover illustration, digital layout
- Jimmy Hubbard - photography
