= The Erosion of Sanity =

Studio album by Gorguts
- Released: January 19, 1993
- Studios: Victor, Montreal, Quebec
- Genres: Death metal, technical death metal
- Length: 36:46
- Label: Roadrunner
- Producers: Gorguts, Steve Harris

Gorguts chronology
Considered Dead (1991)	The Erosion of Sanity (1993)	Obscura (1998)

Professional ratings
Review scores
Source	Rating
AllMusic	3/5 stars
Disposable Underground	Favorable
Under the Volcano	Favorable

The Erosion of Sanity is the second full-length album by Canadian technical death metal band Gorguts. The album was released on January 19, 1993, through Roadrunner Records. Though it is now considered a milestone in the genre, the album's release coincided with the decline of death metal's popularity as a genre, and Roadrunner decided to drop the band from their roster. The band subsequently entered into a five-year state of limbo in which they ceased touring, during which all members except Luc Lemay left. Gorguts later returned with a new lineup, releasing their third full-length album Obscura in 1998.

== Music ==
The album's music is considered to be extremely technical, and is considered to be a move in a more progressive direction from its predecessor. The album's sound has drawn comparisons to Death, Pestilence, Atheist, and Cynic. The album also contains elements common to the New York style of death metal, drawing comparisons to Suffocation. There are also moments of melody, such as on the track "Condemned to Obscurity". This track's intro employs synthesizers.

== Release and promotion ==
The band embarked on a European tour in support of the album.

The album saw a number of re-releases. It was remastered and re-released with Considered Dead as part of Roadrunner's Two from the Vault series, in 2004. Polish label Metal Mind reissued the remastered album in 2006 with two demo tracks. In 2025, British independent label Cherry Red re-released the album with its predecessor, including bonus tracks. British independent record label Cherry Red reissued the band's first two albums as double CD in 2025. The release contains the demo tracks and a booklet with a recent interview with band founder and only remaining original member Luc Lemay.

== Track listing ==
All lyrics are written by Luc Lemay; all music is composed by Gorguts, except where noted.

No.	Title	Length
1.	"With Their Flesh, He'll Create"	4:03
2.	"Condemned to Obscurity"	4:50
3.	"The Erosion of Sanity"	4:53
4.	"Orphans of Sickness"	5:20
5.	"Hideous Infirmity"	4:05
6.	"A Path Beyond Premonition"	4:56
7.	"Odors of Existence"	3:47
8.	"Dormant Misery" (Acoustic guitar written by Sylvain Marcoux and Lemay)	4:52

2006 reissue bonus tracks
No.	Title	Length
9.	"A Path Beyond Premonition" (Demo)	5:04
10.	"Disecting the Adopted" (Demo)	5:21
Total length:		47:11

== Personnel ==
=== Gorguts ===
- Luc Lemay – vocals, guitar, piano (2), logos, production
- Sylvain Marcoux – guitar, production
- Eric Giguere – bass, production
- Stephane Provencher – drums, production

=== Technical personnel ===
- Steve Harris – production, recording, engineering
- Colin Richardson – mixing
- Luc Pellerin – assistant recording
- Eddy Schreyer – mastering
- Dan Seagrave – cover concept, illustration
- Nathalie Duquette – band portrait
- Jean-Pierre Dubois – photo
- Matt Vickerstaff – 2016 reissue layout
