= Gorguts =

Canadian death metal band

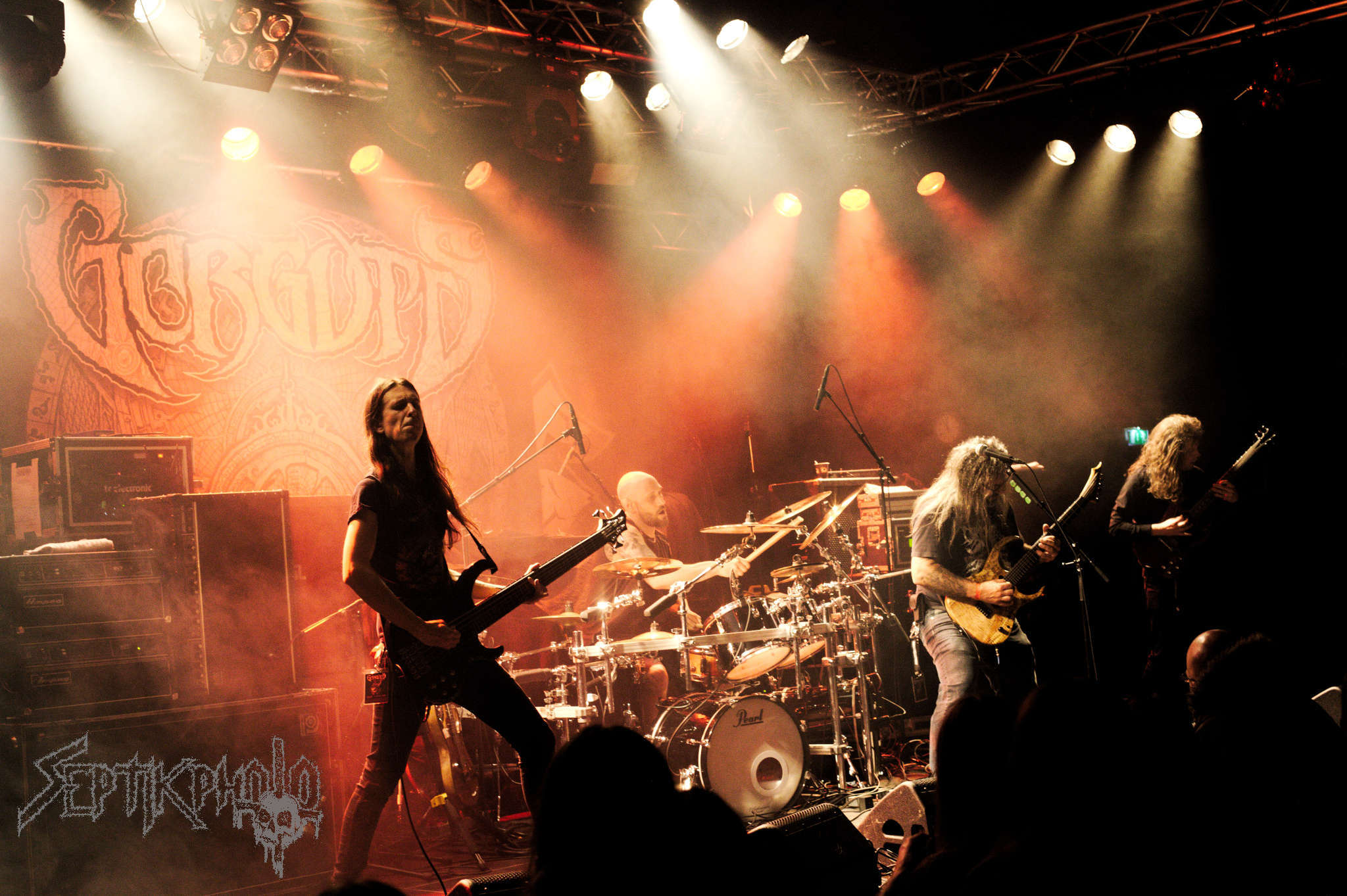
- Gorguts performing in 2016

Background information
- Origin: Sherbrooke, Quebec, Canada
- Genres: Technical death metal; avant-garde metal
- Years active: 1989–2005, 2008–present
- Labels: Olympic; Roadrunner; Slipdisc; Season of Mist
- Members: Luc Lemay; Kevin Hufnagel; Colin Marston; Michel Bélanger
- Past members: Steve MacDonald; Stéphane Provencher; Steeve Hurdle; Sylvain Marcoux; Daniel Mongrain; Éric Giguère; Patrick Robert; Steve Cloutier; John Longstreth; Patrice Hamelin
- Website: www.gorguts.com

Gorguts is a Canadian death metal band formed near Sherbrooke, Quebec, in 1989. Since its inception, the band has undergone numerous membership changes. The sole constant member has been co-founding member and guitarist-vocalist Luc Lemay, who remains the band's driving force. To date, they have released five full-length albums and one EP. Their most recent release, Pleiades' Dust, was released on May 13, 2016. Their latest full-length album, Colored Sands, was released in 2013 and was nominated for a Juno Award. The band is known for its complex, dense form of technical death metal, and has become "one of the most advanced, experimental, and challenging groups in the entire genre."

== History ==
=== Formation, Considered Dead, and The Erosion of Sanity (1989–1993) ===
Luc Lemay (vocals and guitar) and Stephane Provencher (drums) formed Gorguts in August 1989. Carlo Gozzi (bass guitar) and Gary Chouinard (guitar) joined shortly after. One of Provencher's friends suggested the band's name. They released their first demo, with the track "Calamitous Mortification", in 1989. Gozzi left soon after and Éric Giguère replaced him. In June 1990, they recorded their second demo, ...And Then Comes Lividity, and released it in August 1990 with more than 1000 copies. They contacted the manager of the band Obliveon, and he passed the demo on to Dutch-American record label Roadrunner, which led to talks about a record deal. The band finally signed with the label in February 1991. Shortly after, the band replaced Gary Chouinard with guitarist Sylvain Marcoux. In October 1990, they released their first album, Considered Dead. Scott Burns produced it, and it features guest appearances by vocalist Chris Barnes, then singer of Cannibal Corpse, and guitarist James Murphy. In 1992, the band embarked on the "Blood, Guts and Gore" US tour with Cannibal Corpse and Atheist to support the album.

In 1993, they released their second album, The Erosion of Sanity, which was more experimental and technical than Considered Dead. This coincided with the decline of death metal's popularity, and Roadrunner dropped the band from their roster. The band stopped performing for five years, leading many fans to believe they had broken up.

=== Obscura, From Wisdom to Hate, MacDonald's death and break-up (1998–2005) ===
Writing for the next album was finished by late 1993, but lack of label interest delayed its release. Lemay, the only remaining original member, returned in 1998 on Olympic Recordings with a new line-up: Steeve Hurdle (guitar), Steve Cloutier (bass guitar), and Patrick Robert (drums). This lineup released their third full-length album, Obscura, which has been regarded "one of the most pungently progressive albums ever made, in or out of metal." They abandoned old-school death metal for an avant-garde approach that became their standard for future releases.

After Obscura, Hurdle left and was replaced with Dan Mongrain of technical death band Martyr, and Robert was replaced with drummer Steve MacDonald. Gorguts released their next album, From Wisdom to Hate, in 2001. Stylistically, this album is a mix of earlier works and Obscura. Lemay experimented with sounds over notes in riffs, such as the opening of "Inverted", which combines pick-slides, pick tapping, and traditional picking.

Steve MacDonald, who had a history of recurrent depression, committed suicide in 2002, which led to Gorguts disbanding in 2005. In an interview, Lemay said that "When I decided to end the band in 2002 or 2003...after Steve MacDonald passed away, I was done with music and I wanted to devote myself to woodworking full time. I was very happy with all the achievements that the band accomplished so it was all good for me.....no bitterness and no feeling of unfinished business." Lemay moved away from Montreal, "because I was done living there. I wanted to be closer to where I was raised and be closer to nature in a way. After Steve's death I wasn't interested in playing music anymore. I was very content with the musical legacy of the band at that point and I was ready to start a new chapter in my life."

=== Reformation and Colored Sands (2008–2014) ===
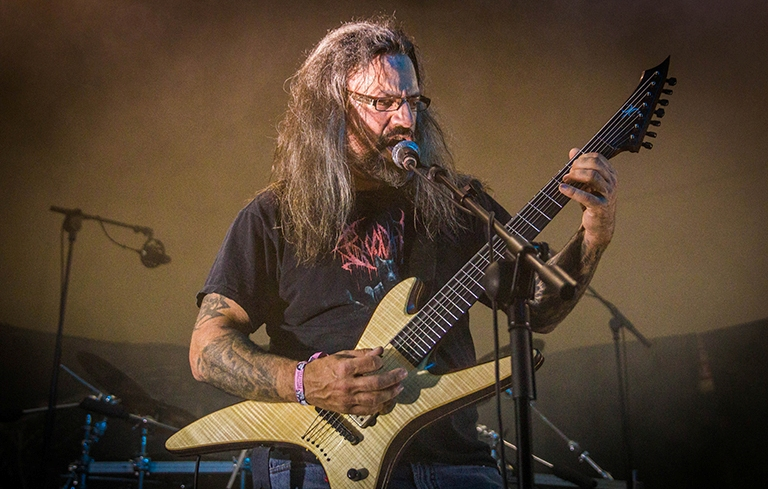
Frontman and founder Luc Lemay performing as a part of Gorguts in 2014

In 2006, Steeve Hurdle asked Lemay to join Hurdle's band Negativa. Lemay accepted "on the condition that everything would be low key. It was all about having fun playing music for me. After a rehearsal Steeve pointed out that it would be cool to make a new Gorguts record to commemorate Gorguts' 20 years of existence. I was all for it and from that point the idea came to play with John (Longstreth – drums), Kevin (Hufnagel – guitar) and Colin (Marston – bass) and create a new record."

In December 2008, a Gorguts demo track with guitar and programmed drums surfaced online, and Lemay confirmed an upcoming reunion with Colin Marston, Kevin Hufnagel, and John Longstreth. While the new Gorguts performed and wrote material, Lemay said the band would not record until late fall 2010, with a 2011 release. In May 2012, Steeve Hurdle died from post-surgical complications. Legal issues surrounding the band's previous contract to Olympic Records delayed the release of the album. Century Media took over Olympic, and Lemay wanted to renegotiate the band's contract. "They agreed to, but in the end, we didn't see eye to eye on things and we mutually agreed it was better to go our separate ways. Dissolving the contract was a very time consuming and complicated legal affair."

The band signed to Season of Mist and revealed that its forthcoming album would be titled Colored Sands, released on August 30, 2013. Inspired by Opeth and the album The Incident by Porcupine Tree, Lemay intended to write more progressive songs with longer running times and increased dynamics. Lemay wrote the classical piece "The Battle of Chamdo" on piano and recorded it with a string quintet. Colored Sands was nominated for a Juno Award.

=== Pleiades' Dust (2014–2019) ===
John Longstreth, whose schedule with Origin was incompatible with Gorguts, departed the band in 2014. Patrice Hamelin, who had perform live with Gorguts since 2011, replaced him. Lemay announced that Gorguts was working on a new album that would consist of one long song. Pleiades' Dust, the resulting EP, was released on May 13, 2016. It is a concept album about the House of Wisdom in Baghdad during Europe's Dark Ages, and is the band's first recording with Hamelin.

On July 25, 2016, the band announced that they would tour North America in October 2016 with Intronaut and Brain Tentacles to support Pleiades' Dust. Following this tour, Gorguts entered another period of relative inactivity.

The band headlined a tour of the US in the late spring of 2017 with Defeated Sanity and Exist.

=== Upcoming album (2020–present) ===
On June 29, 2020, Lemay announced Gorguts was ending its hiatus to begin work on a new album. The band announced a new line-up and live work for 2024. During this time, they supported Cannibal Corpse on their tour of North America with Blood Incantation and Mayhem. Lemay stated his new material borrows "ingredients from all the records," noting he hasn't written a tremolo-picked guitar riff since 1993's The Erosion of Sanity. As of 2026, no new album has been released.

== Musical style and legacy ==
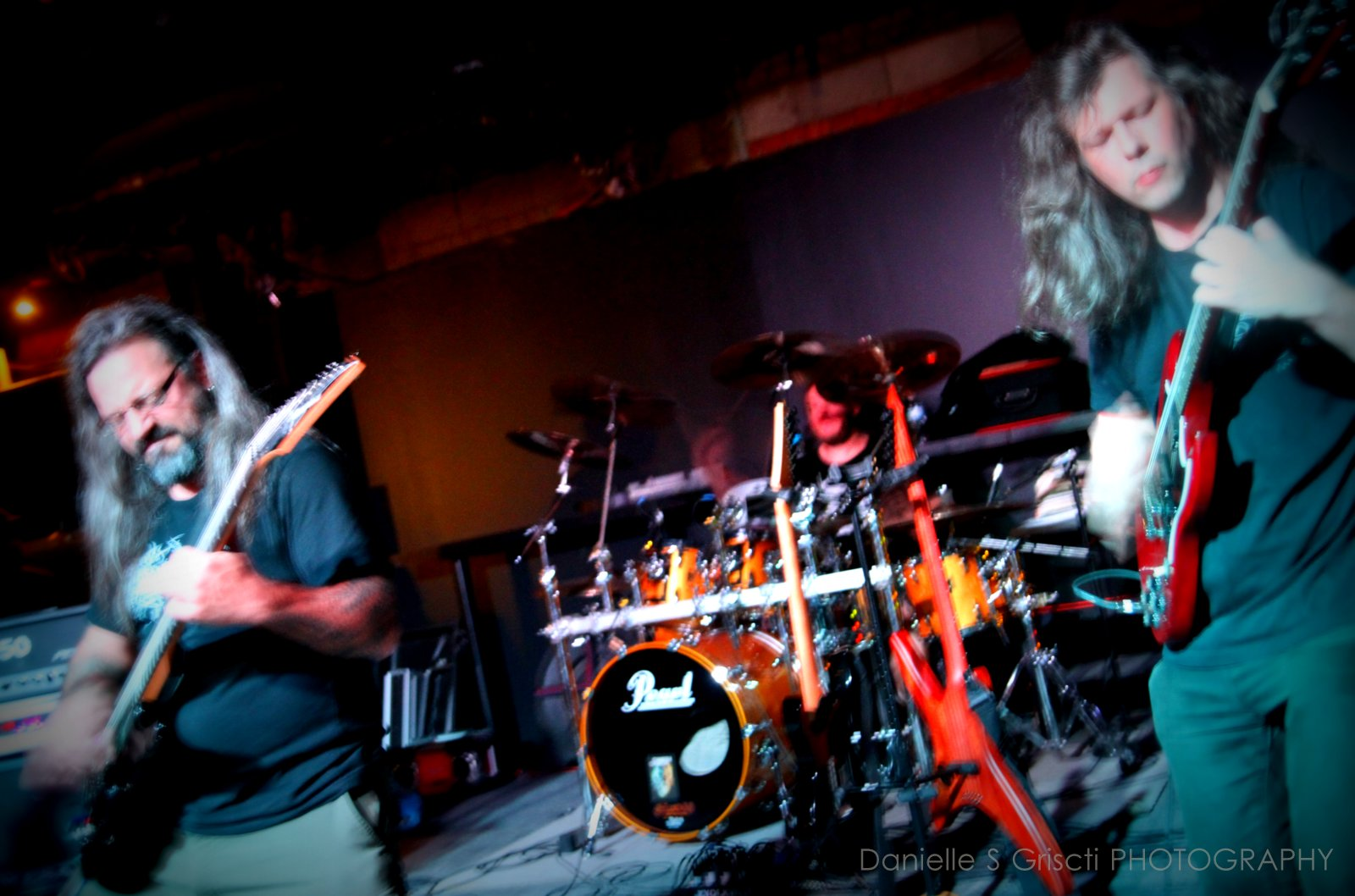
Gorguts performing in 2013

Gorguts' style of metal has evolved considerably since the formation of the band, evolving from a relatively straightforward death metal sound into an increasingly complex style of avant-garde technical death metal. More recently, the band's music is characterised by technically demanding, structurally complex songwriting, with strong use of dissonant and atonal guitarwork. Luc Lemay has noted the influence of Opeth, Deathspell Omega, and Porcupine Tree on his more recent songwriting.

The band's early music, particularly their debut album Considered Dead in 1991, is characterised by a relatively straightforward death metal sound, with conventional instrumentation and song structures. Lemay credits Swedish death metal band Entombed as a major influence on this album. However, on their second album The Erosion of Sanity in 1993, the band began to experiment more, incorporating pianos and acoustic guitars into their sound.

The band took a break after this album but reformed with a new lineup and released Obscura in 1998. Obscura represented a significant shift in the band's style of music, often attributed to then-guitarist Steeve Hurdle. The album made increasing use of complex song structures, unorthodox sounds, dissonant guitar work, unconventional time signatures, and esoteric lyrical themes. "Even by today's standards Obscura is considered to be one of the most complex and technical records in the genre, due to its unprecedented dissonance and experimentation brought by the band's late guitarist Steeve Hurdle."

The following album, 2001's From Wisdom to Hate, represents a balance between Obscura and the previous album The Erosion of Sanity. The complexity and unpredictability of the song structures were scaled back, while still incorporating technically complex compositions, leading to a slightly more streamlined sound.

The band's next album, 2013's Colored Sands, represents a significant evolution in this style of metal, with critics noting that the "huge wall of dissonant lead work and dizzying rhythm riffs have been crafted into something far more atmospheric, but with the heaviness and weight only Gorguts could take to this level, making Colored Sands not only near-immaculately put together, but perhaps one of the most absorbing albums of their genre."

Gorguts' influence on metal has been extensive. They are routinely credited as being key pioneers in the use of dissonance and atonality in metal. They are considered key influences on a range of bands, including Ulcerate, Spawn of Possession, Obscura, Beyond Creation, and many others. Obscura is named after the Gorguts album of the same name.

In 2016, the staff of Loudwire named them the 45th-best metal band of all time.

== Band members ==
=== Current ===
- Luc Lemay – vocals, guitar (1989–2005, 2008–present)
- Kevin Hufnagel – guitar (2009–present)
- Colin Marston – bass guitar, keyboards (2009–present)
- Michel Bélanger – drums (2023–present)

=== Former ===
- Carlo Gozzi – bass guitar (1989)
- Gary Chouinard – guitar (1989–1990)
- Sylvain Marcoux – guitar (1990–1993)
- Stephane Provencher – drums (1989–1993)
- Éric Giguère – bass guitar (1990–1993)
- Steve MacDonald – drums (1993–1995, 1998–2002; died 2002)
- Steeve Hurdle – guitar, vocals (1993–1999; died 2012)
- Steve Cloutier – bass guitar (1993–2004)
- Patrick Robert – drums (1996–1998)
- Dan Mongrain – guitar (1999–2001)
- John Longstreth – drums (2009–2014)
- Patrice Hamelin – drums (2014–2023)

== Discography ==
=== Studio albums ===
- Considered Dead (1991)
- The Erosion of Sanity (1993)
- Obscura (1998)
- From Wisdom to Hate (2001)
- Colored Sands (2013)

=== EPs ===
- Pleiades' Dust (2016)

=== Compilations ===
- Demo Anthology (2003)

=== Live albums ===
- Live in Rotterdam (2006)

=== Demos ===
- '89 Demo (1989)
- ...And Then Comes Lividity (1990)
