= Colin Marston =

American musician and record producer

Colin J. Marston
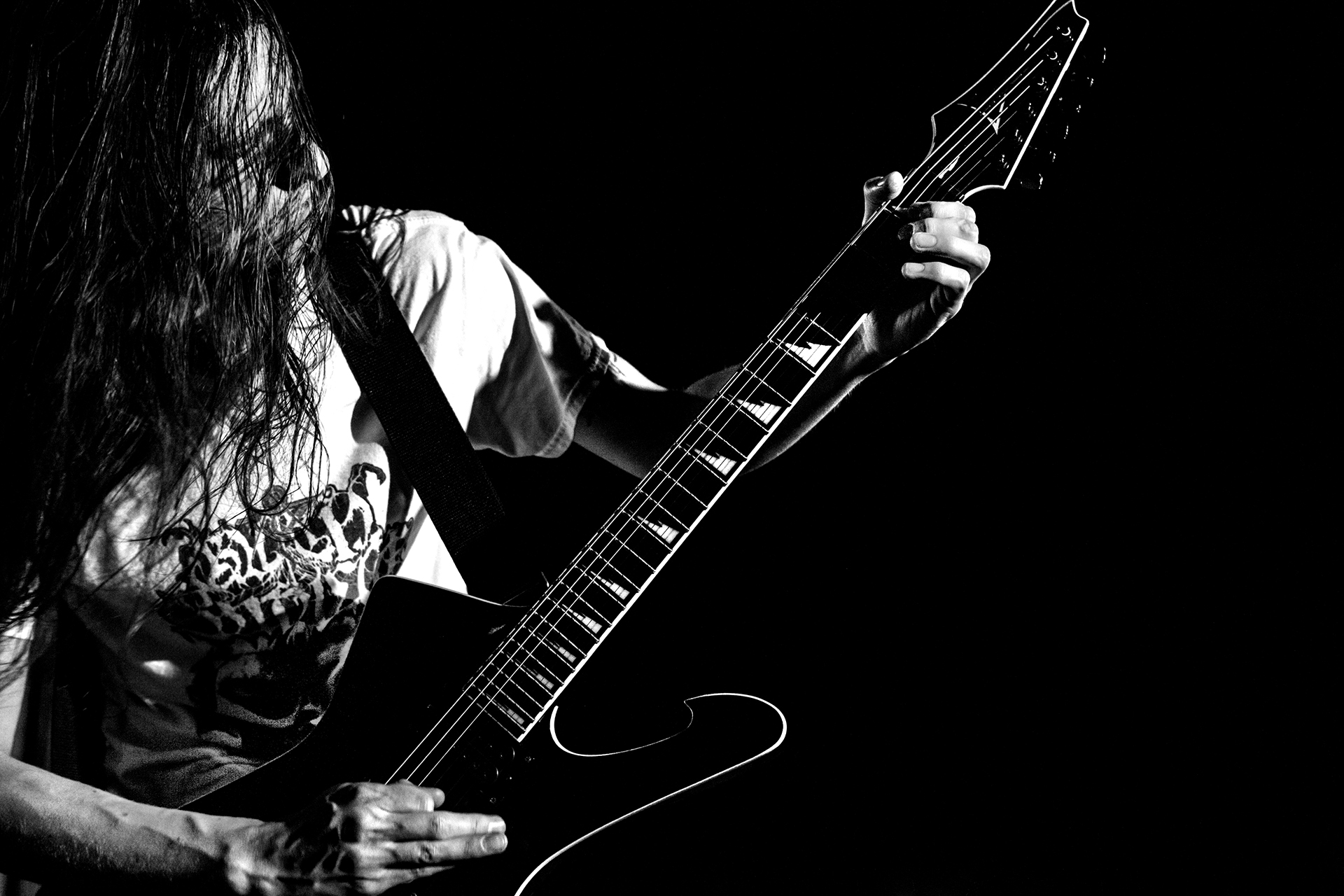
- Marston performing with Krallice in 2016

Background information
- Born: Colin James Marston; September 13, 1982 (age 43)
- Origin: Philadelphia, Pennsylvania, U.S.
- Genres: Technical death metal, black metal, avant-garde
- Occupations: Record producer; musician
- Instruments: Bass; guitar; keyboards
- Years active: 2004–present
- Website: thethousandcaves.com

Colin James Marston (born September 13, 1982) is an American record producer and musician residing in New York City. He graduated from New York University with a Bachelor of Arts degree in music technology in 2004, and owns Menegroth The Thousand Caves Recording Studios in Woodhaven, Queens, while not on tour with one of a number of bands. He is also known for his performances in Behold... The Arctopus, Dysrhythmia, Krallice, and the reunion lineup of Gorguts. Marston has produced, mastered, and mixed music for artists such as Imperial Triumphant, Cleric, Genghis Tron, Kayo Dot, Jarboe, Capillary Action, Origin, Panopticon, Altar of Plagues, Liturgy, Pyrrhon, and Orthrelm, as well as for his own bands. Marston is multi-instrumentalist; he plays guitar, bass, and keyboards.

== Works ==
- Behold... The Arctopus.
- Dysrhythmia – (experimental post rock).
- Byla – (ambient/drone soundscapes with guitar melodies).
- Krallice – (avant-garde/experimental/progressive black metal featuring Mick Barr of Orthrelm).
- Indricothere – (technical death metal with various metal influences and ambient soundscapes, formerly known as "Vegan Death").
- Infidel? / Castro! - (abstract electroacoustic, conceptual metal with George Korein).
- Gorguts – (technical death metal, bass in Gorguts reunion line up).
- Domestigrind – (grindcore)
- Encenathrakh – (technical death metal)

== Performance discography ==
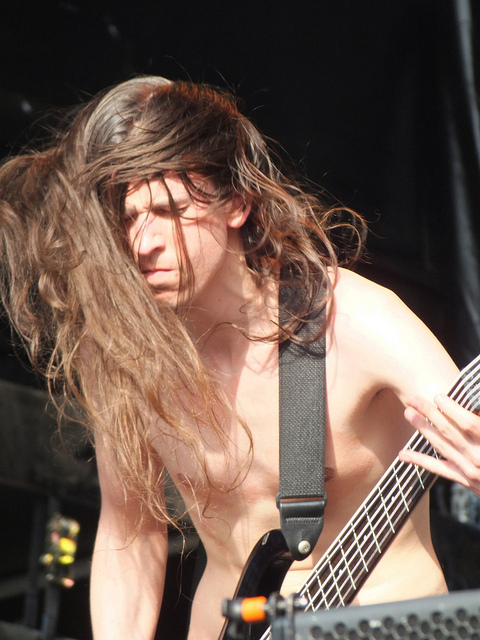
Marston performing in 2013

=== Infidel?/Castro! ===
- 2000: Infidelicacy (Self-released/independent)
- 2001: Case Study In Bioentropy (Self-released/independent)
- 2003: Infidel?/Castro! And Friendly Bears – A Split Experience (Epicene Sound Systems / Rice Control)
- 2005: Bioentropic Damage Fractal (Crucial Blast)

=== Behold... The Arctopus ===
- 2003: Arctopocalypse Now... Warmageddon Later (Epicene Sound Systems)
- 2005: Nano-Nucleonic Cyborg Summoning (Troubleman Unlimited)
- 2006: Split with Orthrelm (Crucial Blast)
- 2007: Memphis 6-3-06 (s.l.a.p.)
- 2007: Skullgrid (Black Market Activities)
- 2012: Horrorscension (Black Market Activities)
- 2016: Cognitive Emancipation
- 2020: Hapeleptic Overtrove
- 2023: Interstellar Overtrove

=== Byla ===
- 2005: Byla (Translation Loss Records)
- 2007: Byla + Jarboe – Viscera (Translation Loss Records)

=== Dysrhythmia ===
- 2006: Barriers And Passages (Relapse Records)
- 2007: Split with Rothko – Fractures (Acerbic Noise Development)
- 2009: Psychic Maps (Relapse Records)
- 2012: Test of Submission (Profound Lore)
- 2016: The Veil of Control (Profound Lore)
- 2019: Terminal Threshold

=== Solo ===
- 2007: Colin Marston – 200220032004 (Self-released/independent)
- 2007: Indricothere – Indricothere (The Sacrosanct Opuscule)
- 2013: Indricothere – II (Self-released/independent; vinyl on Gilead Media)
- 2013: Indricothere – XI (Self-released/independent)
- 2015: Indricothere – Plagued (Self-released/independent)
- 2015: Indricothere – XI. (Self-released/independent)
- 2016: Indricothere – III. (Self-released/independent)

=== Krallice ===
- 2008: Krallice (Profound Lore Records)
- 2009: Dimensional Bleedthrough (Profound Lore Records)
- 2011: Diotima (Profound Lore Records)
- 2012: Years Past Matter (Self-released/independent; vinyl on Gilead Media)
- 2015: Ygg huur (Self-released/independent; vinyl on Gilead Media)
- 2016: Hyperion (EP) (Self-released/independent; vinyl on Gilead Media)
- 2016: Prelapsarian (Self-released/independent; vinyl on Gilead Media)
- 2017: Loüm (Self-released/independent; vinyl on Gilead Media)
- 2017: Go Be Forgotten (Self-released/independent; vinyl on Gilead Media)
- 2019: Wolf EP (Self-released)
- 2020: Mass Cathexis (Gilead Media)
- 2021: Demonic Wealth (Self-released)
- 2022: Crystalline Exhaustion (Self-released)
- 2022: Psychagogue (Self-released)
- 2024: Inorganic Rites (Self-released)

=== Sailors With Wax Wings ===
- 2010: Sailors With Wax Wings (Angel Oven Records)

=== Pyramids ===
- 2009: Pyramids With Nadja (Hydra Head Records)
- 2015: A Northern Meadow (Profound Lore Records)

=== So Is The Tongue ===
- 2012: Child of Divorce (Nefarious Industries) – Warr Guitar

=== East of the Wall ===
- 2018: Farmer's Almanac (Nefarious Industries) – Warr Guitar

=== Gorguts ===
- 2013: Colored Sands (Season of Mist)
- 2016: Pleiades' Dust (Season of Mist)

=== Sabbath Assembly ===
- 2014: Quaternity (Svart Records)

=== Encenathrakh ===
(All self-released)

- 2013: Respekt the Demo
- 2015: Encenathrakh
- 2019: The 2 Song Promo 19
- 2020: Live Album
- 2020: Thraakethraaeate Thraithraake
- 2021: Studio Album
- 2022: Ithate Thngth Oceate

=== Withered ===
- 2016: Grief Relic (Season of Mist) – Bass

=== M Lamar & Mivos Quartet ===
- 2017: Surveillance Punishment and the Black Psyche – Guitar

=== Panopticon ===
- 2019: The Crescendo of Dusk (Bindrune Recordings) – Additional Keys
